= Pakenham =

Pakenham may refer to:

== People ==
- Pakenham (surname)

== Places ==
- Pakenham, Ontario, Canada
- Pakenham, Suffolk, United Kingdom
  - Pakenham Windmill
- Pakenham, Victoria, Australia
  - Pakenham Secondary College
  - Pakenham railway line
  - Pakenham railway station

== Other ==
- HMS Pakenham, the name of three ships of the Royal Navy
- Pakenham's Case, a case in British property law
