= General Pakenham =

General Pakenham may refer to:

- Edward Pakenham (1778–1815), British Army major general
- Hercules Robert Pakenham (1781–1850), British Army lieutenant general
- Thomas Pakenham, 5th Earl of Longford (1864–1915), British Army brigadier general
- Ridley Pakenham-Walsh (1888–1966), British Army major general
