= Earl of Longford =

Title in the peerage of Ireland

Earl of Longford 2nd creation
- Arms: Quarterly: 1st: Quarterly or and gules, in the first quarter an eagle displayed vert (Pakenham); 2nd: Argent, on a bend indented sable cotised azure three fleurs-de-lis argent each cotise charged with three bezants (Cuffe); 3rd: Ermine, a griffin segreant azure armed and langued gules beaked or (Aungier); 4th: Per bend crenellée argent and gules (Boyle). Crest: Out of a Mural Crown Or, an Eagle displayed Gules. Supporters: Dexter: A Lion Azure, charged on the shoulder with an Escarbuncle Or; Sinister: A Griffin Azure, wings Ermine, beaked and legged Or.
- Creation date: 20 June 1785
- Creation: Second
- Created by: King George III
- Peerage: Peerage of Ireland
- First holder: Elizabeth Pakenham, 1st Countess of Longford
- Present holder: Thomas Pakenham, 8th Earl of Longford
- Heir apparent: Edward Pakenham, Lord Silchester
- Remainder to: the 1st Countess' heirs male of the body lawfully begotten
- Subsidiary titles: Baron Longford; Baron Silchester (UK); Baron Pakenham (UK)
- Seats: Tullynally Castle; North Aston Hall
- Motto: GLORIA VIRTUTIS UMBRA; Glory is the shadow of virtue)

Earl of Longford 1st creation
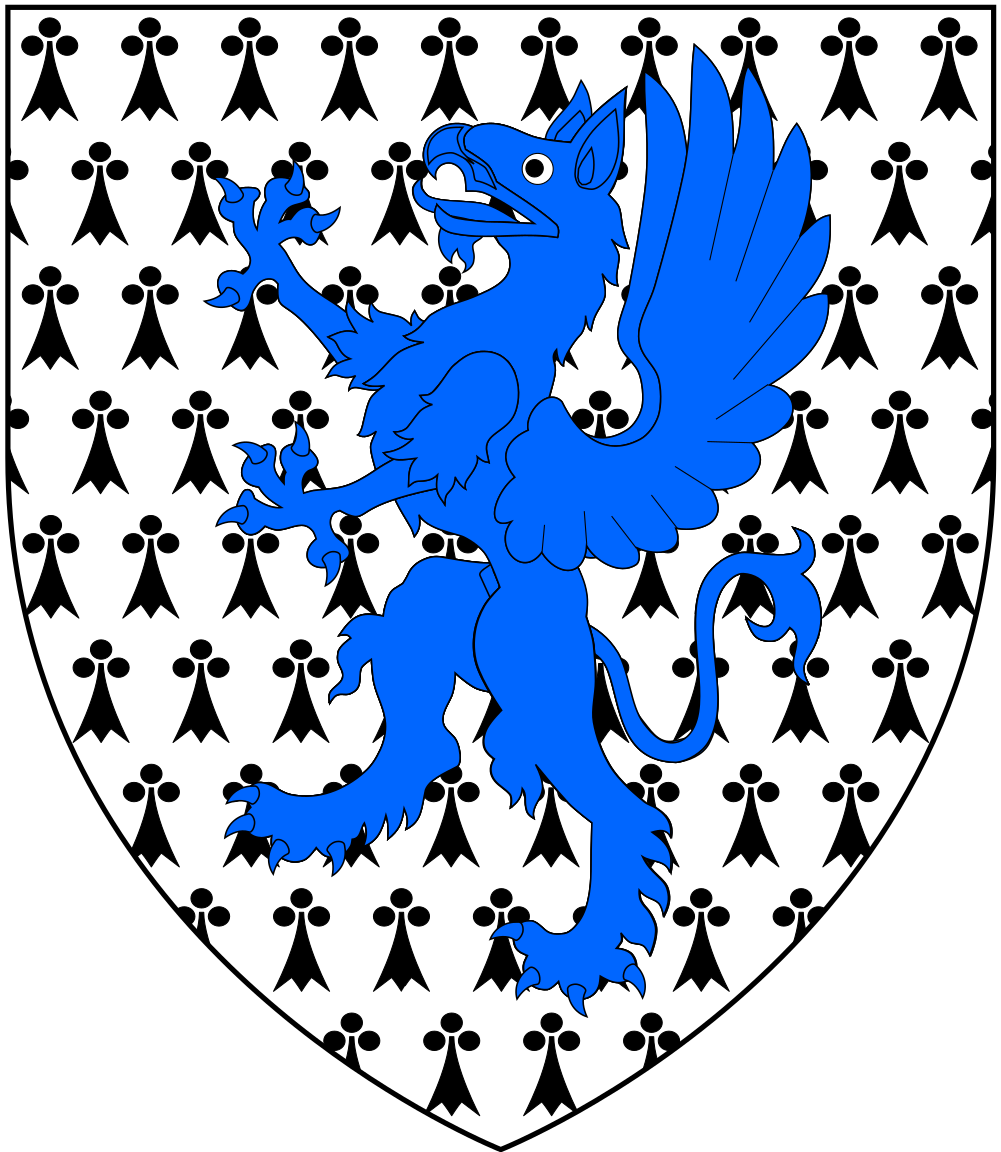
- Arms: Ermine, a griffin segreant azure armed and langued gules beaked or. Crest: A griffin segreant azure, armed and langued gules, beaked or, holding an escarbuncle or. Supporters: Dexter: A Lion Azure, armed and langued Gules, charged on the shoulder with an Escarbuncle Or; Sinister: A Griffin Azure, armed and langued Gules, beaked Or, wings addorsed Ermine.
- Creation date: 18 December 1677
- Creation: First
- Created by: King Charles II
- Peerage: Peerage of Ireland
- First holder: Francis Aungier, 3rd Baron Aungier
- Last holder: Ambrose Aungier, 2nd Earl of Longford
- Remainder to: The 1st Earl’s heirs male of the body lawfully begotten
- Subsidiary titles: Viscount Longford; Baron Aungier
- Status: Extant
- Extinction date: 23 January 1705 (revived in 1785)
- Motto: SCIO CONFIDO (I know confidence well)

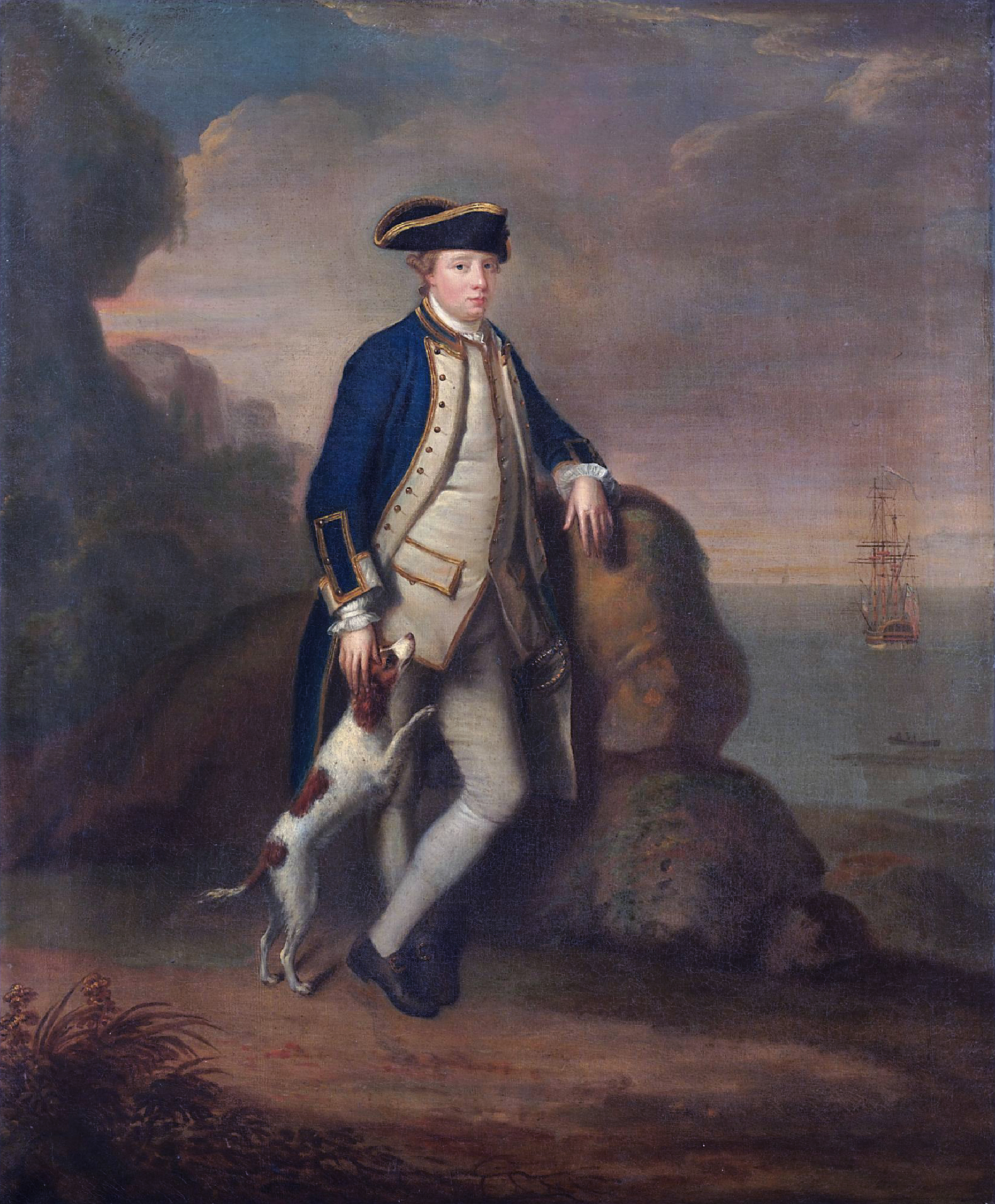
Edward Pakenham, 2nd Baron Longford, by Robert Hunter.

Earl of Longford is a title that has been created twice in the Peerage of Ireland.

== History ==
The title was first bestowed upon Francis Aungier, 3rd Baron Aungier of Longford, in 1677, with remainder to his younger brother Ambrose. He had previously represented Surrey in the House of Commons and had already been created Viscount Longford in the Peerage of Ireland in 1675, with similar remainder. He was succeeded according to the special remainder (and, normally, in the barony) by his brother Ambrose, the second Earl. On his death in 1706 all the titles became extinct. The title of Baron Aungier of Longford was created in the Peerage of Ireland in 1621 for the first Earl's grandfather Sir Francis Aungier, Master of the Rolls in Ireland. The latter was succeeded by his eldest son Gerald, the second Baron, who in his turn was succeeded by his nephew, the aforementioned third Baron and first Earl of Longford, the eldest son of Ambrose Aungier, Chancellor of St Patrick's Cathedral, second son of the first Baron. Gerald Aungier, brother of the first Earl, was Governor of Bombay.

Alice Aungier, sister of the first and second Earl of Longford, married Sir James Cuffe, Member of Parliament for County Mayo. Their son Francis Cuffe also represented County Mayo in the Irish Parliament. Francis's son Michael Cuffe sat as Member of Parliament for County Mayo and Longford Borough. Michael's daughter Elizabeth Cuffe married Thomas Pakenham, of Pakenham Hall, just outside Castlepollard, County Westmeath, in 1739. Thomas represented Longford Borough in the Irish House of Commons. In 1756 the Longford title held by his wife's ancestors was revived when he was raised to the Peerage of Ireland as Baron Longford, in the County of Longford. In 1785 the earldom was also revived when Elizabeth was created Countess of Longford in her own right in the Peerage of Ireland. Lord Longford was succeeded by his eldest son, the second Baron. He represented County Longford in the Irish Parliament. He died aged only 49 and was succeeded by his son, the third Baron. In 1794 the third baron also succeeded his grandmother as second Earl of Longford. Lord Longford sat in the British House of Lords as one of the 28 original Irish representative peers. In 1821 he was created Baron Silchester, of Silchester in the County of Southampton, in the Peerage of the United Kingdom, which gave him and his heirs an automatic seat in the House of Lords.

He was succeeded by his eldest son, the third Earl. He died unmarried and was succeeded by his younger brother, the fourth Earl. He was a Conservative politician and served under the Earl of Derby and Benjamin Disraeli as Under-Secretary of State for War from 1866 to 1868. His son, the fifth Earl, was Lord-Lieutenant of County Longford from 1887 to 1915. Lord Longford was killed in action at Gallipoli in 1915. He was succeeded by his eldest son, the sixth Earl. He was a minor playwright and poet and also sat as a member of Seanad Éireann between 1946 and 1948.

He died childless and was succeeded by his younger brother, the seventh Earl. He was a prominent Labour politician and social activist. In 1945, sixteen years before he succeeded his elder brother, he was raised to the Peerage of the United Kingdom in his own right as Baron Pakenham, of Cowley in the City of Oxford. Lord Longford served in the Labour administrations of Clement Attlee and Harold Wilson as Chancellor of the Duchy of Lancaster, First Lord of the Admiralty, Lord Privy Seal, Leader of the House of Lords and Secretary of State for the Colonies. In 1999, at the age of 94 and after the House of Lords Act 1999 removed the automatic right of hereditary peers to sit in the House of Lords, Lord Longford was created a life peer as Baron Pakenham of Cowley, of Cowley in the County of Oxfordshire. He was therefore able to remain a member of the House of Lords until his death in 2001.

As of 2017 the titles (other than that of Baron Pakenham of Cowley, which as a life peerage became extinct in 2001) are held by his eldest son, the eighth Earl. He does not use his title and did not use his courtesy title of Lord Silchester which he was entitled to from 1961 to 2001. Known simply as Thomas Pakenham, he is a writer and historian.

Several other members of the Pakenham family have also gained distinction. Henry Pakenham, great-grandfather of the first Baron, represented Navan in the Irish House of Commons. His son Sir Thomas Pakenham, grandfather of the first Baron, sat as Member of Parliament for Augher. Sir Thomas's son Edward Pakenham, father of the first Baron, represented County Westmeath in the Irish Parliament. The Honourable Sir Thomas Pakenham, third son of the first Baron and the Countess of Longford, was an admiral in the Royal Navy. His fourth son Sir John Pakenham was also an admiral in the Royal Navy while his fifth son Sir Richard Pakenham was a noted diplomat and served as Envoy Extraordinary and Minister Plenipotentiary to the United States from 1843 to 1847. The Honourable Sir Edward Pakenham, second son of the second Baron, was a major-general in the army. He served in the Peninsular Wars under his brother-in-law, General Arthur Wellesey, who married his sister Kitty Pakenham in 1806. Sir Edward Pakenham was killed at the Battle of New Orleans in 1815.

The Honourable Sir Hercules Pakenham (1781–1850), third son of the second Baron, was a lieutenant-general in the army and Member of Parliament for County Westmeath. He was the father of 1) Edward Pakenham, MP for Antrim, and 2) Sir Thomas Pakenham, also a lieutenant-general. The latter's eldest son Hercules Pakenham was an Ulster Unionist Party member of the Senate of Northern Ireland. The Honourable Thomas Alexander Pakenham (1820–1889), third son of the second Earl, was a rear-admiral in the Royal Navy. His second son Sir William Pakenham was an admiral in the Royal Navy. The Honourable Sir Francis Pakenham, seventh son of the second Earl, was a diplomat and notably served as Ambassador to Sweden. Lady Violet Pakenham, daughter of the fifth Earl, was a writer and critic and the wife of the author Anthony Powell. Elizabeth Pakenham (born Harman), Countess of Longford, wife of the seventh Earl, was a writer and social activist. Lady Antonia Fraser and Rachel Billington, daughters of the seventh Earl, are both prominent authors. Lady Judith Kazantzis, daughter of the seventh Earl, is a poet. The Honourable Sir Michael Pakenham, third son of the seventh Earl, is a diplomat.

The ancestral seat of the Pakenham family is Tullynally Castle, County Westmeath. Previously known as Pakenham Hall, it was renamed by the current owner, Thomas Pakenham and North Aston Hall near North Aston, Oxfordshire

Not to be confused with Baron Longford, a minor British Peerage title (1747) of the current Earl of Radnor.

== Baron Aungier of Longford (1621) ==
- Francis Aungier, 1st Baron Aungier of Longford (c. 1562 – 1632)
- Gerald Aungier, 2nd Baron Aungier of Longford (died 1655)
- Francis Aungier, 3rd Baron Aungier of Longford (died 1700) (created Viscount Longford in 1675)

=== Viscount Longford, first creation (1675) ===
- Francis Aungier, 1st Viscount Longford (died 1700) (created Earl of Longford in 1677)

=== Earl of Longford, first creation (1677) ===
- Francis Aungier, 1st Earl of Longford (died 1700)
- Ambrose Aungier, 2nd Earl of Longford (died 1706)

== Viscount Longford, second creation (1713) ==
- Christopher Fleming, 1st Viscount Longford and 17th Baron Slane (1669–1726)

Lord Slane (who had succeeded to the title Baron Slane in 1676) was created Viscount Longford by Queen Anne in 1713. The viscounty became extinct upon his death.

== Baron Longford (1756) ==
- Thomas Pakenham, 1st Baron Longford (1713–1766)
- Edward Michael Pakenham, 2nd Baron Longford (1743–1792)
- Thomas Pakenham, 3rd Baron Longford (1774–1835) (succeeded his grandmother as Earl of Longford in 1794)

=== Earl of Longford, second creation (1785) ===
- Elizabeth Pakenham, 1st Countess of Longford (1719–1794). Lady Longford was the daughter of Michael Cuffe, MP for County Mayo and Longford Borough, by Frances Sandford, daughter of Henry Sandford, of Castlerea, County Mayo. She was the great-granddaughter of Sir James Cuffe by his wife Alice Aungier, sister and heiress of Francis Aungier, 1st Earl of Longford, and Ambrose Aungier, 2nd Earl of Longford, of the first creation. Lady Longford married Thomas Pakenham, son of Edward Pakenham, in 1740. In 1756 the Longford title held by her ancestors was revived when her husband was created Baron Longford in the Peerage of Ireland. In 1785 the earldom was also revived when Lady Longford was created Countess of Longford in the Irish peerage in her own right. Lord Longford died in April 1766, aged 52. Lady Longford survived him by almost thirty years and died in January 1794, aged 74. She was succeeded in the earldom by her grandson, Thomas, her eldest son Edward having predeceased her.
  - Edward Michael Pakenham, 2nd Baron Longford (1743–1792)
- Thomas Pakenham, 2nd Earl of Longford (1774–1835)
- Edward Michael Pakenham, 3rd Earl of Longford (1817–1860)
- William Lygon Pakenham, 4th Earl of Longford (1819–1887)
  - William Pakenham, Lord Silchester (1864–1876)
- Thomas Pakenham, 5th Earl of Longford (1864–1915)
- Edward Arthur Henry Pakenham, 6th Earl of Longford (1902–1961)
- Francis Aungier "Frank" Pakenham, 7th Earl of Longford (1905–2001)
- Thomas Francis Dermot Pakenham, 8th Earl of Longford (born 1933)

The heir apparent is the present holder's eldest son Edward Melchior Pakenham, Lord Silchester (b. 1970).
The heir apparent's heir apparent is his eldest son, Hon. Thomas Arthur Pakenham (b. 2012).

=== Line of succession and other titles held by descendants of the 1st Countess ===
Line of succession (simplified)
- Elizabeth Pakenham, 1st Countess of Longford (1719–1794)
  - Edward Michael Pakenham, 2nd Baron Longford (1743–1792)
    - Thomas Pakenham, 2nd Earl of Longford, 1st Baron Silchester (1774–1835)
      - William Lygon Pakenham, 4th Earl of Longford, 3rd Baron Silchester (1819–1887)
        - Thomas Pakenham, 5th Earl of Longford, 4th Baron Silchester (1864–1915)
          - Francis Aungier "Frank" Pakenham, 7th Earl of Longford, 6th Baron Silchester, 1st Baron Pakenham (1905–2001)
            - Thomas Pakenham, 8th Earl of Longford, 7th Baron Silchester, 2nd Baron Pakenham (born 1933) (Note: Does not use the title.)
              - (1) Edward Pakenham (born 1970) (Note: Does not use his courtesy title of Lord Silchester.)
                - (2) Thomas Pakenham (born 2012)
                - (3) Ferdinand Pakenham (born 2016)
              - (4) Frederick Pakenham (born 1971) (Note: Does not use his courtesy style of Honourable.)
            - Hon. Patrick Pakenham (1937–2005)
              - (5) Richard Pakenham (born 1969)
                - (6) Alexander Pakenham (born 2004)
              - (7) Guy Pakenham (born 1970)
              - (8) Harry Pakenham (born 1972)
            - (9) Hon. Sir Michael Pakenham (born 1943)
            - Hon. Kevin Pakenham (1947–2020)
              - (10) Thomas Pakenham (born 1977)
              - (11) Benjamin Pakenham (born 1983)
              - (12) Dominic Pakenham (born 1989)
    - Hon. Sir Hercules Robert Pakenham (1781–1850)
      - Thomas Pakenham (1826–1913)
        - Hercules Pakenham (1863–1937)
          - Hercules Pakenham (1901–1940)
            - male issue in line to Irish peerages
    - Hon. Henry Pakenham (1787–1863)
      - William Pakenham (1826–1886)
        - Robert Pakenham (1866–1959)
          - Robert Pakenham (1912–1998)
            - male issue in line to Irish peerages
        - Hamilton Pakenham (1867–1957)
          - Richard Pakenham (1906–1993)
            - male issue in line to Irish peerages
          - Henry Pakenham (1911–2010)
            - male issue in line to Irish peerages
  - Hon. Sir Thomas Pakenham (1757–1836)

(1)–(9) are in line for the earldom and both the Silchester and the Pakenham baronies.
(10)–(19) are in line for the earldom and the Silchester barony.

== Feudal lords and feudal barons of Annaly, Westmeath and later County Longford ==
In 1552, King Edward VI granted lands of Annalye to Baron Delvin including the Holy Island and lands of the O'Ferralls.

In 1556–57, Philip and Mary made grants to Lord Baron Delvin of the northern Annaly region before the county became County Longford.

King James I also granted to Lord Baron Delvin the Island and monastery of Inchemore, otherwise Inismore, in the Annalie.

Longford's Market and Fair Rights - Baron Delvin was Granted Patent and Charter for Market and Fair - Grant 1605 - License to hold a Thursday market and a fair on the 1st of August with the usual court baron powers
