= Thomas Pakenham =

Thomas Pakenham may refer to:

- Thomas Pakenham (historian) (born 1933), 8th Earl of Longford, Anglo-Irish historian and arborist
- Thomas Pakenham, 1st Baron Longford (1713–1766), Irish peer and politician
- Thomas Pakenham (Augher MP) (1649–1703), grandfather of the preceding
- Thomas Pakenham (Royal Navy officer) (1757–1836), British naval officer and politician
- Thomas Pakenham, 2nd Earl of Longford (1774–1835), Irish peer
- Thomas Pakenham, 5th Earl of Longford (1864–1915), Irish peer and soldier
- Thomas Pakenham (British Army officer) (1826–1913), MP for Antrim
