= Pakenham (surname) =

Pakenham is a surname of Old English origin. It is a locational surname from Pagham, Sussex, or Pakenham, Suffolk.

- Antonia Pakenham, maiden name and early pen-name of author Antonia Fraser (born 1932)
- Edward Pakenham (1778–1815), British general
- Sir Francis Pakenham (diplomat) (1832–1905), British envoy to Chile, Argentina and Sweden
- The Hon. Sir Michael Pakenham (born 1943), retired British diplomat
- Sir Richard Pakenham (1797 – 1868), British diplomat of Anglo-Irish background
- Thomas Pakenham (disambiguation), several people including:
  - Thomas Pakenham (Royal Navy officer) (1757–1836), British admiral
- William Christopher Pakenham (1861–1933), British admiral
- the surname of several Earls of Longford
- the Baronets of Pakenham
