= Elizabeth Pakenham, 1st Countess of Longford =

Irish noblewoman (1719–1794)

Elizabeth Pakenham, 1st Countess of Longford (26 July 1719 (baptised) – 27 January 1794), formerly Elizabeth Cuffe, was an Irish noblewoman. She was the wife of Thomas Pakenham, 1st Baron Longford, the mother of Edward Michael Pakenham, 2nd Baron Longford, and the grandmother of Thomas Pakenham, 2nd Earl of Longford.

Elizabeth was the only child and heiress of Michael Cuffe, MP, and his wife, the former Frances Sandford, a descendant of George FitzGerald, 16th Earl of Kildare. She married The Baron of Longford, then Thomas Pakenham, on 5 March 1740.

Their children were:

- Edward Pakenham, 2nd Baron Longford (1743-1792), who married Catherine Rowley and had children, including the 2nd Earl
- Frances (1744-1779), who married John Ormsby Vandeleur (1750-1777), and had one child
- Robert Pakenham, MP in the Irish Parliament (died 1775)
- Helena (1745-1777), who married William Sherlock and had children
- Mary (1749-1775), who married Thomas Fortescue and had children
- William Pakenham (1756-1769), who died in childhood
- Admiral Sir Thomas Pakenham (1757-1836), who married Louisa Staples and had children

In 1756 the Longford barony held by Elizabeth's great-great-uncles, Francis Aungier, 1st Earl of Longford, and Ambrose Aungier, 2nd Earl of Longford, of the first creation, was revived when her husband Thomas Pakenham was created Baron Longford in the Peerage of Ireland. In 1785 the earldom was revived and Lady Longford was created Countess of Longford in her own right.

The family seats were Pakenham Hall in County Westmeath and Longford Castle in County Longford (demolished in 1972).

The Countess of Longford survived her husband, who died in April 1766, aged 52; his title was inherited by their eldest son, Edward. When the countess died in January 1794, aged 74, she was succeeded in the earldom by her grandson, Thomas, her eldest son Edward having predeceased her.

Peerage of Ireland
| New creation | Countess of Longford; 1785 – 1794 | Succeeded by Thomas Pakenham |
