= Château de Leynes =

Castle and priory in Saône-et-Loire, France

Coordinates: 46°16′12″N 4°43′36″E

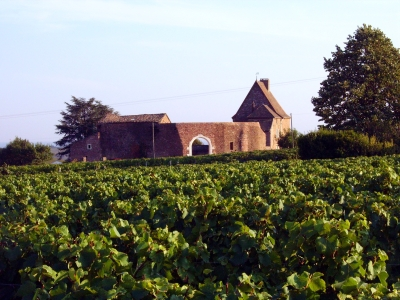
Château de Leynes

The Château de Leynes is an old fortified castle and priory in the commune of Leynes in the Saône-et-Loire département of France.

The estate of Leynes was granted by Charles the Bald in a charter dated 19 March 875 to Tournus Abbey, a gift confirmed by the Pope in 1119. The castle however, also the property of the abbey of Tournus, is not recorded until a document of 1423 mentions it for the first time in connection with the civil war between the Armagnacs and the Burgundians, when the Armagnacs occupied it.

The castle was plundered, besieged and burned several times, principally in 1471 by the troops of Louis XI, and in 1593 by the lord of Nogent and his soldiers. It remained in a ruined state for more than a century before the abbey was forced by its condition to carry out emergency repairs in 1716.

The castle today has been renovated and is used as a guest house and gîte.

== See also ==
- List of castles in France
