= Edward Pakenham, 2nd Baron Longford =

Royal Navy officer and politician (1743–1792)

The Right Honourable The Lord Longford
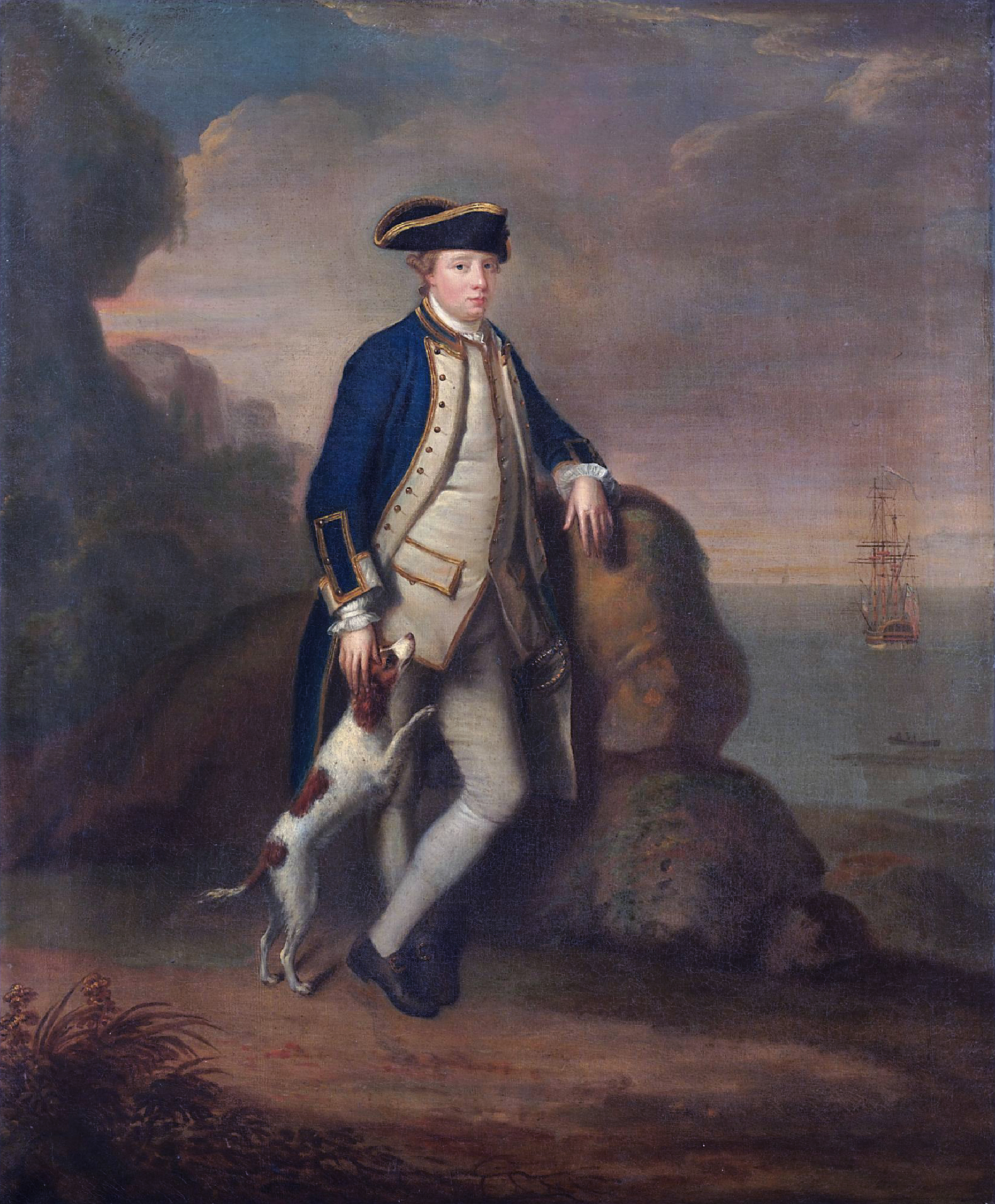
- Portrait by Robert Hunter
- Born: 1 April 1743; Westmeath
- Died: 3 June 1792 (aged 49)
- Education: Kilkenny College
- Military career
- Allegiance: Great Britain
- Branch: Royal Navy
- Service years: c.1761–1792
- Rank: Captain
- Commands: HMS Bonetta; HMS Sheerness; HMS America; HMS Alexander
- Conflicts: Seven Years' War; American War of Independence; Battle of Ushant (1778); Battle of Ushant (1781); Battle of Cape Spartel

Member of the Ireland Parliament for County Longford
- In office 1765–1766

Captain Edward Michael Pakenham, 2nd Baron Longford (1 April 1743 – 3 June 1792) was a Royal Navy officer and politician who served in the Seven Years' War and American War of Independence.

== Early life ==
Pakenham was the son of Thomas Pakenham, 1st Baron Longford and Elizabeth Cuffe, 1st Countess of Longford. His parents had seven children, including Sir Thomas Pakenham, a Royal Navy officer.

His father was the eldest son and heir of Edward Pakenham MP of Pakenham Hall (son of Sir Thomas Pakenham) and Margaret Bradestan (daughter and heiress of John Bradestan). His mother was the daughter and sole heiress of Michael Cuffe MP (second son and sole heir of Francis Cuffe), and Frances (née Sandford) Cuffe (a daughter of Henry Sandford of Castlereagh).

Longford was educated at Kilkenny College and joined the Royal Navy at the age of sixteen.

== Career ==
He served during the Seven Years' War taking part in naval engagements off the coasts of West Africa and North America. He was captured by the Spanish near the end of the war and held for over a year. After he returned home following the Treaty of Paris he briefly represented County Longford in the Irish House of Commons between 1765 and 1766.

In 1776, he inherited his father's title and seat in the Irish House of Lords. In January 1778 he returned to active service during the American War of Independence, serving in the English Channel and Mediterranean Sea. He returned home in 1782 having earned around £5,000 in prize money.

== Personal life ==
In 1768, Lord Longford married Hon. Catherine Rowley, daughter of Elizabeth Rowley, 1st Viscountess Langford and Hercules Langford Rowley MP. He was the owner of Pakenham Hall Castle in County Westmeath, which he systematically improved during his lifetime. Catherine and Edward had a number of children including:

- Hon. Catherine "Kitty" Pakenham (1773–1831), who married the Arthur Wellesley, 1st Duke of Wellington.
- Thomas Pakenham, 2nd Earl of Longford (1774–1835), who married Lady Georgiana Emma Charlotte Lygon, daughter of William Lygon, 1st Earl Beauchamp.
- Maj.-Gen. Hon. Sir Edward Pakenham (1778–1815), who served as MP for Longford Borough and was killed in action at the Battle of New Orleans.
- Lt.-Gen. Hon. Sir Hercules Robert Pakenham (1781–1850), a lieutenant-general of the British Army and was brevet colonel and aide-de-camp to William IV. He married Emily Stapleton, the fourth daughter of Sir Thomas Stapleton, 6th Baronet, 12th Baron le Despencer.
- Capt. Hon. William Pakenham (died 1811), a member of the Royal Navy who drowned in 1811.
- Very Rev. Hon. Henry Pakenham (1787–1863), the Dean of St Patrick's Cathedral who married Eliza Catherine Sandford (died 1867), sister and co-heiress of Henry Sandford, 2nd Baron Mount Sandford.
- Hon. Elizabeth Pakenham (died 1851), who married Henry Stewart of Trycallen in 1793.
- Hon. Helen Pakenham (died 1807), who married James Hamilton (died 1805), eldest son of John Hamilton of Brown Hall, in 1799.
- Hon. Caroline Penelope Pakenham (died 1854), who married Henry Hamilton (died 1850), eldest son of Sackville Hamilton, in 1808.

Langford died in June 1792, aged 49, and was succeeded in the barony by his eldest son Thomas, who in 1794 also succeeded his grandmother in the earldom of Longford.

Parliament of Ireland
Preceded by Robert Harman; John Gore	Member of Parliament for County Longford; 1765–1766; With: Ralph Fetherston	Succeeded by Ralph Fetherston; Wentworth Parsons
Peerage of Ireland
Preceded by Thomas Pakenham	Baron Longford; 1776–1792	Succeeded by Thomas Pakenham
