= Cofman =

Danish travel portal company

- Company type: Limited Liability Company
- Industry: Travel
- Founded: 2000; 26 years ago in Denmark
- Founder: Søren Christian Rix
- Headquarters: Herning, Denmark
- Website: www.cofman.com

Cofman is a Danish travel portal company founded in 2000 with the aim to index all holiday rental homes European wide and the ability for customers to instantly identify and reserve relevant holiday homes instantly online.

== History ==
The service was first launched in early 2000 - in two languages and featuring some 800 vacation houses. By mid-2004, the service was available in 5 languages and featured more than 10,000 vacation homes.

Houses outside Denmark was included for the first time in 2007, and the database has grown to more than 200,000 vacation homes in 9 languages (English, German, Danish, Italian, Spanish, French, Swedish, Dutch and Norwegian) as of March 2012.

== Technology ==
The company is mainly developing their own proprietary algorithms to identify available and cost efficient holiday homes throughout the countries covered with the main focus on Denmark and Germany where they are often referenced by popular local media.

== See also ==
- Casa rural
