= Gîtes de France =

- Fédération Nationale des Gîtes de France
- Logo of Gîtes de France used since 2020
- Formation: 1955
- Type: Société par actions simplifiée
- Website: gites-de-france.com

Fédération Nationale des Gîtes de France (French pronunciation: [ʒit də fʁɑ̃s]) is an organization that lists and rates the quality campgrounds, bed and breakfasts and self catering gites.

== History ==
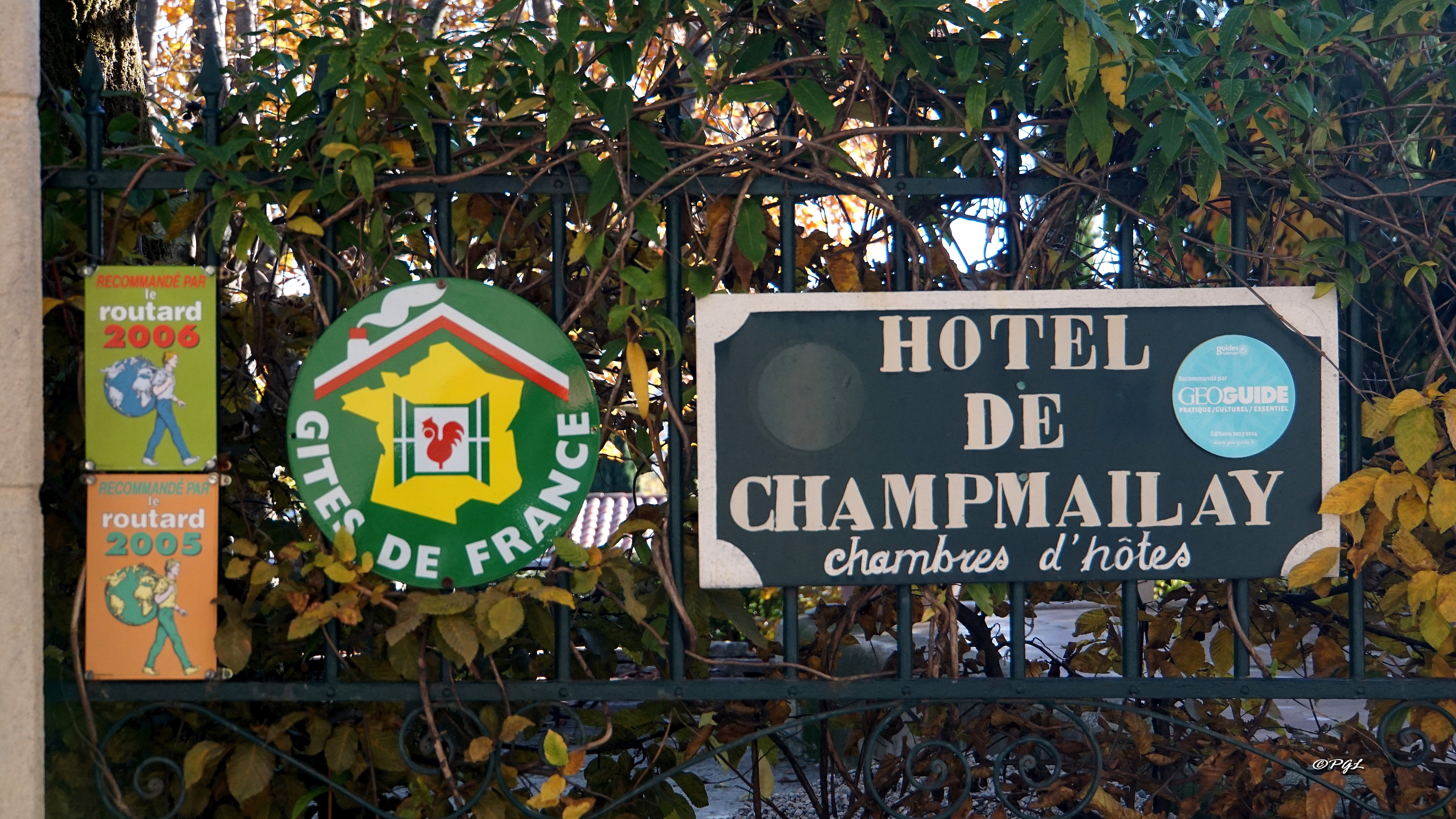
Welcome sign at a Gîtes de France hotel

Gîtes de France was founded in 1955 by Émile Aubert.
