= Henry Pakenham =

Irish Anglican cleric

Henry Pakenham (24 August 1787; 26 December 1863) was Dean of St Patrick's Cathedral, Dublin from 1843 until his death.

The 9th child and 5th son of Edward Michael Pakenham, 2nd Baron Longford he was educated at Trinity College, Dublin. His sister was the wife of the 1st Duke of Wellington. He married Eliza Catherine Sandford, daughter of the Rev. William Sanford and Jane Oliver, and sister of Henry Sandford, 2nd Baron Mount Sandford. Her father was a grandson of Stephen Moore, 1st Viscount Mountcashell, and her mother was the daughter of the Irish MP and Privy Counsellor Silver Oliver. They had three sons, Henry, William and Hamilton, and a daughter, Emily.
