= Thomas Pakenham, 2nd Earl of Longford =

Anglo-Irish peer

Thomas Pakenham, 2nd Earl of Longford, KP (14 May 1774 – 28 May 1835), known as The Lord Longford between 1792 and 1794, was an Anglo-Irish hereditary peer.

== Early life ==
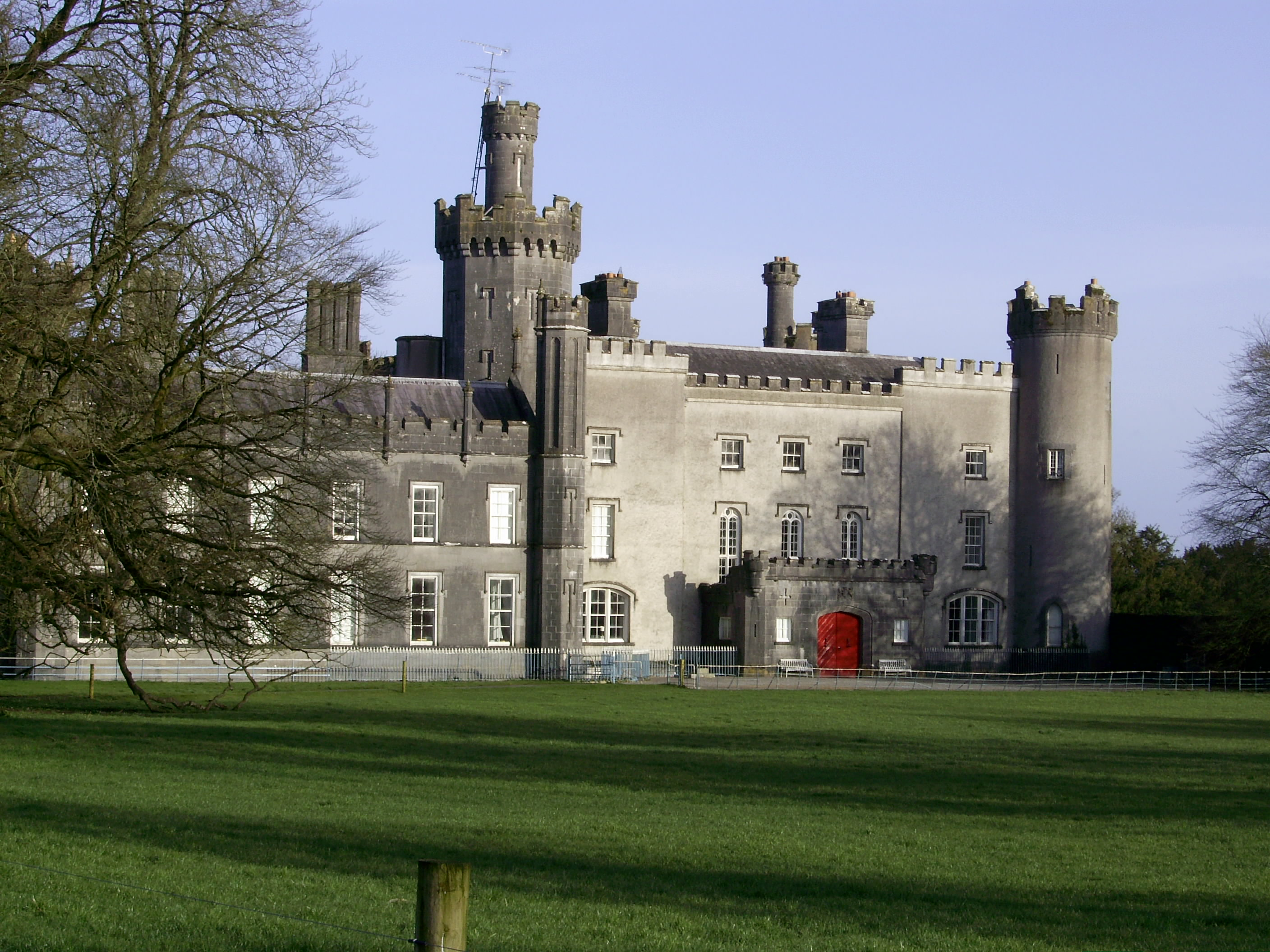
Pakenham Hall (now Tullynally), County Westmeath

Pakenham was born in 1774, the eldest son of Edward Pakenham, 2nd Baron Longford and his wife Catherine Rowley, daughter of Hercules Rowley. Pakenham succeeded his father in the Longford barony in 1792, inheriting Pakenham Hall (otherwise known as Tullynally Castle). Two years later also succeeded his paternal grandmother Elizabeth Pakenham, 1st Countess of Longford as the 2nd Earl of Longford.

Pakenham's sister, the Honourable Catherine Pakenham, was the wife of the Arthur Wellesley, 1st Duke of Wellington. Longford initially refused to allow them to marry, as the future Duke was then a penniless younger son with few prospects. One of his younger brothers was the Honourable Sir Edward Pakenham, a British Army officer who served under Wellington in the Peninsular War. Another younger brother was Sir Hercules Robert Pakenham CB, KCB, a lieutenant-general in the British Army who was brevet colonel and aide-de-camp to King William IV.

== Public life ==
Longford was one of the original 28 Irish representative peers elected to the first Union Parliament on 2 August 1800. He had supported the Act of Union 1800, and like most of the Irish aristocracy had received a handsome financial inducement to do so. He was a member of the House of Lords until his death. He was appointed a Knight of the Order of St Patrick on 17 December 1813. In 1821 he was created Baron Silchester, of Silchester in the County of Southampton, in the Peerage of the United Kingdom, which gave him and his descendants an automatic seat in the House of Lords. He used his influence to strongly, but unsuccessfully, oppose Catholic Emancipation. This led him to clash publicly with his brother-in-law Wellington, a convert to Emancipation who as Prime Minister steered the measure through Parliament.

== Marriage and children ==
Longford married Lady Georgiana Emma Charlotte Lygon, daughter of William Lygon, 1st Earl Beauchamp, on 23 January 1817. They had eight children:

- Edward Michael Pakenham, 3rd Earl of Longford (30 October 1817 - 27 March 1860), unmarried.
- General William Lygon Pakenham, 4th Earl of Longford (31 January 1819 - 19 April 1887)
- Rear Admiral Hon Thomas Alexander Pakenham (3 March 1820 - 5 January 1889), father of Admiral Sir William Pakenham.
- Hon Charles Reginald Pakenham (21 September 1821 - 1 March 1857)
- The Reverend Hon Henry Robert Pakenham (26 September 1822 - April 1856)
- Major Hon Frederick Beauchamp Pakenham (25 September 1823 - 15 February 1901)
- Lady Georgina Sophia Pakenham (c 1828 - 26 March 1909), married William Cecil, 3rd Marquess of Exeter.
- Hon Sir Francis John Pakenham KCMG (29 February 1832 - 29 January 1905), served as Ambassador to Sweden.

Lord Longford remodelled the 17th-century Pakenham Hall in the Gothic Revival style in the early 1800s, adding towers and a moat. It was by then larger than any other castellated house in Ireland. In the family circle he was known for his fund of amusing stories.

== Death ==
Lord Longford died in May 1835 at the age of 61 and was succeeded in the earldom by his eldest son, Edward. Longford's second son, William, who eventually succeeded his brother to the earldom, was a general in the British Army.

The Countess of Longford survived her husband by over 40 years and died in February 1880.

Peerage of Ireland
Preceded by Elizabeth Pakenham	Earl of Longford; 1794–1835	Succeeded by Edward Michael Pakenham
Preceded by Edward Pakenham	Baron Longford; 1792–1835	Succeeded by Edward Michael Pakenham
Peerage of the United Kingdom
New creation	Baron Silchester; 1821–1835; Member of the House of Lords (1821–1835)	Succeeded by Edward Michael Pakenham
Political offices
New title	Representative peer for Ireland; 1800–1835	Succeeded by The Earl of Bandon
