= William Pakenham, 4th Earl of Longford =

Anglo-Irish soldier and politician (1819–1887)

General The Right Honourable The Earl of Longford GCB DL JP
- Born: 31 January 1819; County Westmeath, Ireland
- Died: 19 April 1887 (aged 68); London, England
- Military career
- Allegiance: United Kingdom
- Branch: British Army
- Rank: General
- Conflicts: Crimean War; Indian Rebellion
- Awards: Knight Grand Cross of the Order of the Bath

General William Lygon Pakenham, 4th Earl of Longford, GCB, DL, JP (31 January 1819 – 19 April 1887), styled The Honourable William Pakenham before 1860, was an Anglo-Irish hereditary peer, soldier and Conservative politician.

== Early life and education ==
Pakenham was the second son of Thomas Pakenham, 2nd Earl of Longford and his wife Lady Georgiana Emma Charlotte Lygon, daughter of William Lygon, 1st Earl Beauchamp. He was educated at Winchester College and entered the army in 1837. A year prior to his entry into the army, Pakenham played a single first-class cricket match for the Gentlemen in the Gentlemen v Players fixture of 1836 at Lord's. He, however, had no success in the match, twice being dismissed without scoring.

== Military career ==
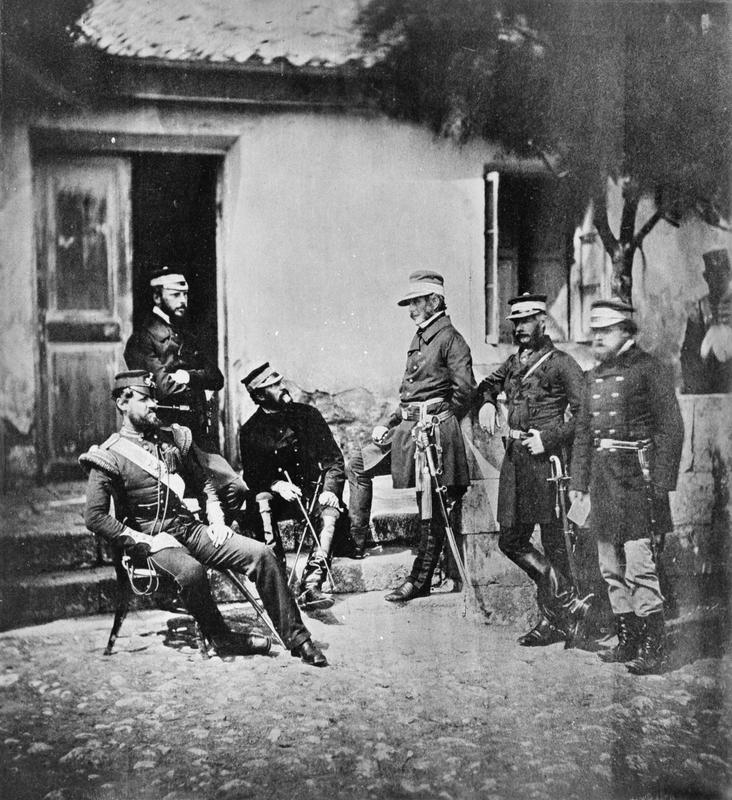
Pakenham (far right) pictured on the staff of General Estcourt, Crimea 1855

After service in both the Crimean War and the Indian Rebellion, Pakenham became Adjutant-General in India in November 1858. He was also Colonel of the Northumberland Fusiliers from 1878 to his death.

== Public life ==
Pakenham succeeded in the earldom and to a seat in the House of Lords in 1860 upon the death of his unmarried and childless elder brother, the third Earl. He sat on the Conservative benches in the House of Lords and served as Under-Secretary of State for War from 1866 to 1868 under first the Earl of Derby and later Benjamin Disraeli. In February 1870 he was voted chairman of the Central Protestant Defence Association which was established in response to the Irish Church Act 1869. He also served as Lord Lieutenant of Longford from 1874 to 1887. In Dublin, he was a member of the Kildare Street Club.

== Honours ==
Longford was created CB in 1855, KCB in the 1861 Birthday Honours and GCB in the 1881 Birthday Honours.

== Marriage and children ==
Lord Longford married the Honourable Selina Rice-Trevor, daughter of George Rice-Trevor, 4th Baron Dynevor, in 1862. They had five children:

- Lady Georgiana Frances Henrietta Pakenham (1863 - 30 July 1943), married Hugh Gough, 3rd Viscount Gough.
- William Pakenham, Lord Silchester (19 October 1864 - 16 February 1876)
- Brigadier general Thomas Pakenham, 5th Earl of Longford (19 October 1864 - 21 August 1915)
- Major Hon Edward Michael Pakenham (20 February 1866 - 27 December 1937)
- Lady Katharine Louisa Pakenham (1868 - 9 March 1954), married Lt Col Hon William Lyonel Vane, mother of William Fletcher-Vane, 1st Baron Inglewood.

== Death ==
Lord Longford died in April 1887 at the age of 68 and was succeeded in the earldom by his second but eldest surviving son, Thomas. His grandson Frank Pakenham, 7th Earl of Longford, became a prominent Labour politician.

The Countess of Longford survived her husband by over thirty years and died in January 1918, aged 81.

Military offices
Preceded by Edward Lugard	Adjutant-General, India; 1858–1860	Succeeded by Edmund Haythorne
Preceded by Edward Rowley Hill	Colonel of the Northumberland Fusiliers; 1878–1887	Succeeded by Joseph Henry Laye
Political offices
Preceded by The Lord Dufferin and Clanboye	Under-Secretary of State for War; 1866–1868	Succeeded by The Lord Northbrook
Honorary titles
Preceded by The Lord Annaly	Lord Lieutenant of Longford; 1874–1887	Succeeded by The Earl of Longford
Peerage of Ireland
Preceded by Edward Michael Pakenham	Earl of Longford; 1860–1887	Succeeded by Thomas Pakenham
