= Catherine Wellesley, Duchess of Wellington =

British Prime Minister's wife

Her Grace The Duchess of Wellington
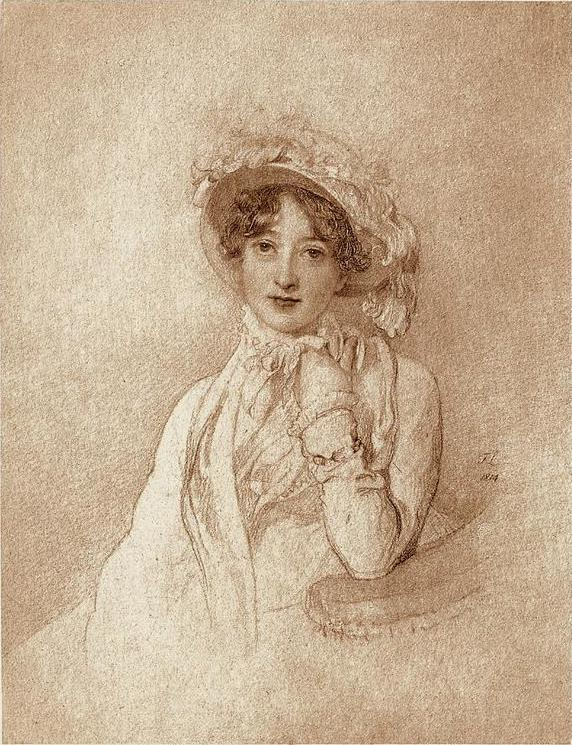
- Born: Hon. Catherine Sarah Dorothea Pakenham; 14 January 1773; Dublin, Ireland
- Died: 24 April 1831 (aged 58); Apsley House, London, England, U.K.
- Known for: Spouse of the prime minister of the United Kingdom (1828–1830)
- Spouse: Arthur Wellesley, 1st Duke of Wellington (m. 1806)
- Children: Arthur Wellesley, 2nd Duke of Wellington; Lord Charles Wellesley
- Parents: Edward Pakenham, 2nd Baron Longford; Catherine Rowley
- Relatives: Hercules Langford Rowley (grandfather)

Catherine Sarah Dorothea Wellesley, Duchess of Wellington (née Pakenham; 14 January 1773 – 24 April 1831), known before her marriage as Kitty Pakenham, was the wife of Arthur Wellesley, 1st Duke of Wellington.

== Early life ==
Catherine Pakenham was of Anglo-Irish ancestral origin, born on the 14 January 1773 in Dublin, Ireland. A daughter of Edward Pakenham, and the former Catherine Rowley, she became "The Honourable Catherine Pakenham" when her father succeeded as the 2nd Baron Longford in 1776. Among her siblings were Thomas Pakenham, 2nd Earl of Longford; Gen. Sir Edward Pakenham; and Lt.-Gen. Sir Hercules Robert Pakenham, aide-de-camp to King William IV.

Her paternal grandparents were Thomas Pakenham, 1st Baron Longford, and Elizabeth Cuffe, 1st Countess of Longford. Her maternal grandparents were Elizabeth Rowley, 1st Viscountess Langford, and Hercules Langford Rowley, Member of Parliament for County Meath and County Londonderry.

== Personal life ==
Pakenham had met Wellesley in Ireland when they were both young, and Wellesley, after numerous visits to the Longfords' Dublin home, made his feelings towards her clear. At the time, her family disapproved of the match as Wellesley was the third son of a large family and had little in the way of prospects. After the rejection by the Pakenhams, Wellesley became serious about his military career, was posted to the Netherlands and India, enjoyed a spectacular rise, and seemingly forgot about Pakenham. Although she remained hopeful that they would be reunited, she admitted to a friend, Olivia Sparrow, after many years that she thought the "business over". She became engaged to Galbraith Lowry Cole, the second son of the Earl of Enniskillen, but Sparrow, who was in contact with Wellesley, revealed that he still considered himself attached to her. After much soul-searching, Pakenham broke off the engagement to Cole, although she believed the stress of the affair had damaged her health.

=== Marriage to Arthur Wellesley ===
Pakenham had been a pretty, vivacious girl when Wellesley had met her ten years before, but she had been very ill in 1795–6, during his absence, and was thin, pale and in poor health by the time he informed their mutual friend Olivia Sparrow that he was returning to England and that she should "renew the proposition he had made some years ago" on his behalf. Pakenham feared that Wellesley felt bound by promises he had made ten years earlier and was in two minds as to whether to accept the proposal. Despite his more formal proposal after he had obtained her brother's permission, she insisted that he should see her in person before committing himself. Wellesley travelled to Ireland to meet her, and although he was obviously disappointed in the change in her (he remarked to his brother "She has grown ugly, by Jove!"), went ahead with the marriage. The couple were married on 10 April 1806, St. George's Church, Dublin (while it was using a temporary chapel in Drumcondra), by Wellesley's clergyman brother, Gerald. After a brief honeymoon, Wellesley returned to England. Pakenham followed him and after a stay with his brother, while Wellesley continued to inhabit his bachelor's lodging, they set up home together in Harley Street.

Though she regained something of her former health, the two did not get on well together. Wellesley was a man of action, as well as frugal and reserved, with a sharp wit; Pakenham was protective and possessive. With little in common, Wellesley could not help but give the impression that he found her poor company and although they had two sons, Arthur, in 1807, and Charles, in 1808, they lived apart for most of the time and occupied separate rooms in the house when they were together. Her brother, Edward "Ned" Pakenham, served under Wellesley throughout the Peninsular War and Wellesley's regard for him helped to smooth his relations with Pakenham, until Ned's death at the Battle of New Orleans in 1815.

Wellesley remained in Portugal and Spain during the entire Peninsular War, not returning to England until 1814. Pakenham became short-sighted, causing her to squint when talking. Wellesley found her vain and vacuous. It appears that she indeed loved him, but contented herself by doting on her sons and four adopted children. Wellesley confided to his closest female friend, Harriet Arbuthnot, that he had "repeatedly tried to live in a friendly manner with her ... but it was impossible ... & it drove him to seek that comfort & happiness abroad that was denied him at home". Harriet, the nature of whose own relations with Wellesley remains a subject of speculation, had a rather low opinion of Pakenham—"she is such a fool"—but disputed Wellesley's claim that she cared nothing for his happiness; in a rare moment of sympathy, she wrote that Pakenham wanted above all to make her husband happy, but had no idea how to do it.

=== Duchess of Wellington ===
She became the Duchess of Wellington on Wellesley's creation as the Duke of Wellington on 3 May 1814 and eventually joined him in France when he was appointed Ambassador after Napoleon's exile to Elba. Lady Elizabeth Yorke commented that "her appearance, unfortunately, does not correspond with one's notion of an ambassadress or the wife of a hero, but she succeeds uncommonly well in her part".

Maria Edgeworth, however, found her "delightful" and "amiable" and commented that:

After comparison with crowds of other beaux spirits, fine ladies and fashionable scramblers for notoriety, her graceful simplicity rises in our opinion, and we feel it with more conviction of its superiority.

Germaine de Staël described Pakenham as "adorable".

=== Death ===
She became seriously ill in 1831, which brought Wellington to her bedside. She ran a finger up his sleeve to find if he was still wearing an armlet she had once given him, "She found it, as she would have at any time these past twenty years, had she cared to look for it" remarked Wellington. "How strange it was", he went on to say, "that people could live together for half a lifetime and only understand each other at the end". She died on 24 April.

== Arms ==
Coat of arms of Catherine Wellesley, Duchess of Wellington
Escutcheon Quarterly, I and IV gules, a cross argent, in each quarter five plates; II and III, Or, a lion rampant gules armed and langued Azure gorged with a coronet Or. For augmentation, an inescutcheon charged with the crosses of St. George, St. Andrew, and St. Patrick combined, being the union badge of the United Kingdom (Arthur Wellesley, 1st Duke of Wellington) impaling Quarterly of 4: 1st: Quarterly or and gules, in the first quarter an eagle displayed vert (Pakenham); 2nd: Argent, on a bend indented sable cotised azure three fleurs-de-lis argent each cotise charged with three bezants; 3rd: Ermine, a griffin segreant azure armed and langued gules beaked or; 4th: Per bend crenellée argent and gules (Edward Pakenham, 2nd Baron Longford). Supporters On either side a Lion Gules gorged with an Eastern Coronet and chained Or.
