= 1861 Birthday Honours =

Appointments by Queen Victoria

The 1861 Birthday Honours were appointments by Queen Victoria to various orders and honours to reward and highlight good works by citizens of the British Empire. The appointments were made to celebrate the official birthday of the Queen, and were published in The London Gazette on 28 June 1861.

The recipients of honours are displayed here as they were styled before their new honour, and arranged by honour, with classes (Knight, Knight Grand Cross, etc.) and then divisions (Military, Civil, etc.) as appropriate.

== United Kingdom and British Empire ==
=== Baron ===
- The Right Honourable Sir Richard Bethell Kt Chancellor of Great Britain, by the name, style, and title of Baron Westbury, of Westbury, in the county of Wilts

=== The Most Honourable Order of the Bath ===
==== Knight Grand Cross of the Order of the Bath (GCB) ====
===== Military Division =====
Royal Navy

- Vice-Admiral the Right Honourable Sir Maurice Frederick Fitzhardinge Berkeley KCB
- Admiral Sir Phipps Hornby KCB
- Admiral Sir Barrington Reynolds KCB

Army

- General Sir Arthur Benjamin Clifton KCB
- General Sir James Archibald Hope KCB
- General Sir Thomas William Brotherton KCB
- General Sir Samuel Benjamin Auchmuty KCB
- General Thomas Willshire Bt KCB
- Lieutenant-General Sir Harry David Jones KCB

==== Knight Commander of the Order of the Bath (KCB) ====
===== Military Division =====
Royal Navy

- Admiral Edward Harvey
- Vice-Admiral Henry William Bruce
- Vice-Admiral William Fanshawe Martin
- Rear-Admiral Lewis Tobias Jones CB

Army

- Lieutenant-General William Henry Sewell CB
- Lieutenant-General George William Paty CB
- Lieutenant-General James Shaw Kennedy CB
- Lieutenant-General George Leigh Goldie CB
- Lieutenant-General John Michell CB
- Major-General William Brereton CB
- Colonel the Earl of Longford CB
