= Servient estate =

Parcel of land subject to an easement

A servient estate (or servient premises or servient tenement) is a parcel of land that is subject to an easement. The easement may be an easement in gross, an easement that benefits an individual or other entity, or it may be an easement appurtenant, an easement that benefits another parcel of land.

For an easement appurtenant, the parcel of land that benefits from an easement over the servient estate is called the dominant estate (or dominant premises or dominant tenement).
