= Hercules Robert Pakenham =

British army officer

Lieutenant-General The Honourable Sir Hercules Robert Pakenham KCB
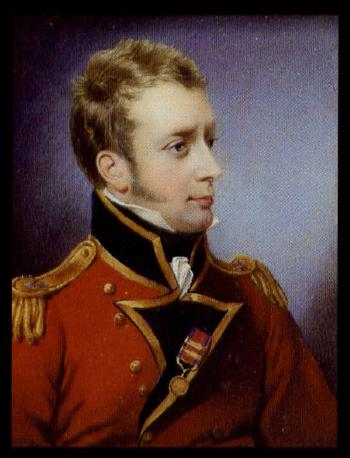
- Miniature portrait by William Egley

Member of Parliament for County Westmeath
- In office 1808–1826 Serving with Gustavus Hume Rochfort, Robert Smyth
- Preceded by: William Smyth; Gustavus Hume Rochfort
- Succeeded by: Gustavus Rochfort; Hugh Morgan Tuite

Personal details
- Born: 29 September 1781
- Died: 7 March 1850 (aged 68) Langford Lodge, County Antrim
- Spouse: Hon. Emily Stapleton (m. 1817)
- Relations: Hercules Pakenham (grandson)
- Children: 9, including Edward, Thomas
- Parent(s): Edward Pakenham, 2nd Baron Longford; Hon. Catherine Rowley

Military service
- Allegiance: United Kingdom
- Branch/service: British Army
- Rank: Lieutenant-General
- Commands: South-West District
- Battles/wars: Napoleonic Wars
- Awards: Peninsular Silver Medal

Lieutenant-General Sir Hercules Robert Pakenham KCB (29 September 1781 – 7 March 1850) was a British Army officer who served as aide-de-camp to William IV of the United Kingdom.

== Early life ==
Hercules Robert Pakenham was born 29 September 1781, the third son of Edward Pakenham, 2nd Baron Longford and Hon. Catherine Rowley. He was a brother of Catherine Pakenham (which made him brother-in-law to Arthur Wellesley, 1st Duke of Wellington), Thomas Pakenham, 2nd Earl of Longford, and Gen. Sir Edward Pakenham.

His mother was the second daughter of the Right Hon. Hercules Langford Rowley and Elizabeth Rowley, 1st Viscountess Langford. His aunt, the Hon. Jane Rowley, was the wife of Thomas Taylour, 1st Earl of Bective, and his uncle, Hercules Rowley, 2nd Viscount Langford, was a member of the Irish House of Commons for County Antrim and Downpatrick.

== Career ==
Pakenham was appointed ensign 40th Regiment of Foot on 23 July 1803, became lieutenant 3 February 1804, was transferred to the 95th rifles (later the Rifle Brigade (Prince Consort's Own)) in April the same year, and obtained his company there on 2 August 1805. He served in the expedition to Copenhagen and in Portugal, where during the Battle of Roliça, he was slightly wounded at Obidos 16–17 Aug. 1808. "He is really one of the best officers of riflemen I have seen," wrote Sir Arthur Wellesley, recommending him for promotion.

He was promoted to a majority in the 7th West India Regiment 30 August 1810, remained with the Peninsular Army, and was assistant adjutant-general of Picton's division up to the fall of Badajos, where he was severely wounded and received the Gold Cross for Busaco, Fuentes d'Onoro, Ciudad Rodrigo and Badajos.

He was promoted to brevet lieutenant-colonel on 27 April 1812, was promoted to lieutenant-colonel 26th Cameronians on 3 September 1812, and transferred as captain and lieutenant-colonel to the Coldstream Guards on 25 July 1814, from which he retired on half-pay in 1817.

He was made brevet colonel and aide-de-camp to the king on 27 May 1825 and was promoted to major-general on 10 January 1837. He succeeded Sir Thomas McMahon as Lieutenant-Governor of Portsmouth and General Officer Commanding South-West District in 1839, was appointed colonel 43rd Light Infantry on 9 September 1844, and was promoted to lieutenant-general on 9 November 1846.

He was appointed Companion of the Order of the Bath (C.B.) on 4 June 1815, Knight Commander of the Order of the Bath (K.C.B.) on 19 July 1838, and received the Peninsular silver medal and Roleia and Vimeiro clasps.

=== Parliament of the United Kingdom ===
Pakenham was a member of Parliament, representing County Westmeath from 27 February 1808 to 1826. He sat for his brother, Thomas, 2nd Earl of Longford and placed votes intermittently between 1821 and 1825. Initially he was against Catholic Relief, but later came to favour it, citing his need representation of the change in opinion among his Protestant constituents.

Pakenham won the 1826 general election for Westmeath, but did not accept due to rumors that his favoring of Protestant interests resulted in his brother "discarding" him. The Catholic press reported that he was "the victim of the vote he gave ... in favour of emancipation." He received £2,929 in compensation during the abolition of slavery, related to 217 slaves on the Blizard Estate in Antigua.

== Personal life ==
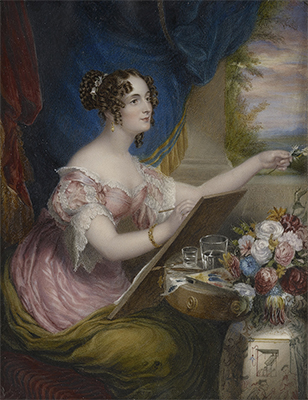
Portrait of his wife Emily, by Henry Collen, after George Hayter, 1825

When he was a captain, Pakenham was mentioned in Lady Morgan's Memoirs: Autobiography, Diaries and Correspondence:

We have had Captain Pakenham here some days; he has just gone to Lifford, but is to return on Wednesday. He is a very pleasant young man; I wish he had been here when you were, that your recollection of Baron’s Court might have been more lively.

— Lady Morgan, Marchioness of Abercorn in a letter to Sydney Owenson, 1810

On 25 December 1817, Pakenham married the Hon. Emily Stapleton (c. 1795–1875), the fourth daughter of Sir Thomas Stapleton, 6th Baronet, 12th Baron le Despencer and the former Elizabeth Eliot. Together, they were the parents of six sons and three daughters, including:

- Edward William Pakenham (1819–1854), an MP who was killed at the Battle of Inkerman in Turkey in 1854.
- Rev. Arthur Hercules Pakenham (1824–1895), who died unmarried.
- Lt.-Gen. Thomas Henry Pakenham (1826–1913), who married Elizabeth Staples Clarke, daughter of William Clarke of New York City, in 1862.
- Robert Maxwell Pakenham (1834–1857), who was killed at the relief of Lucknow in India in 1857.
- Edmund Powerscourt Pakenham (1837–1861), who was killed at Gwalior Fort in India.
- Lt.-Col. Charles Wellesley Pakenham (1840–1873), a Lieutenant-Colonel in the Grenadier Guards who died "from decline" at 33.
- Emily Pakenham (d. 1883), who married Sir Edmund Hayes, 3rd Baronet, son of Sir Samuel Hayes, 2nd Baronet and Elizabeth Lighton (daughter of Sir Thomas Lighton, 1st Baronet), in 1837.
- Elizabeth Catherine Pakenham (d. 1885), who married Thomas Thistlethwayte, son of Thomas Thistlethwayte, in 1850.
- Mary Frances Hester Pakenham, who married Sir William Verner, 2nd Baronet, son of Sir William Verner, 1st Baronet and Harriet Wingfield (a granddaughter of Richard Wingfield, 3rd Viscount Powerscourt) in 1850.

He died suddenly at his residence, Langford Lodge, (Note: Langford Lodge, which had been owned by the Rowley family, came into the Pakenham family through Hercule's mother Catherine Rowley Pakenham. It was passed on to Edward Michael Pakenham (died 1818). Upon Edward's death, the lodge was inherited by Hercules.) County Antrim, on 7 March 1850.

=== Legacy ===
The "Sir Hercules Pakenham Scholarship" and "Emily Lady Pakenham Scholarship" were founded in 1876, by their eldest surviving son, the Rev. Arthur Hercules Pakenham in their memory for students of Queen's College, Belfast.

One of the 42 stalls in the Domus Dei in Portsmouth was dedicated to him.

== Notes ==
Parliament of the United Kingdom
Preceded by William Smyth; Gustavus Hume Rochfort	Member of Parliament for County Westmeath; 1808–1826; With: Gustavus Hume Rochfort; Robert Smyth	Succeeded by Gustavus Rochfort; Hugh Morgan Tuite
Military offices
Preceded by Sir Thomas McMahon	GOC South-West District; 1839–1846	Succeeded by Lord Frederick FitzClarence
Preceded by John Keane, 1st Baron Keane	Colonel of the 43rd (Monmouthshire) Regiment of Foot; 1844–1850	Succeeded by James Fergusson
