= Gîte =

French holiday rental home

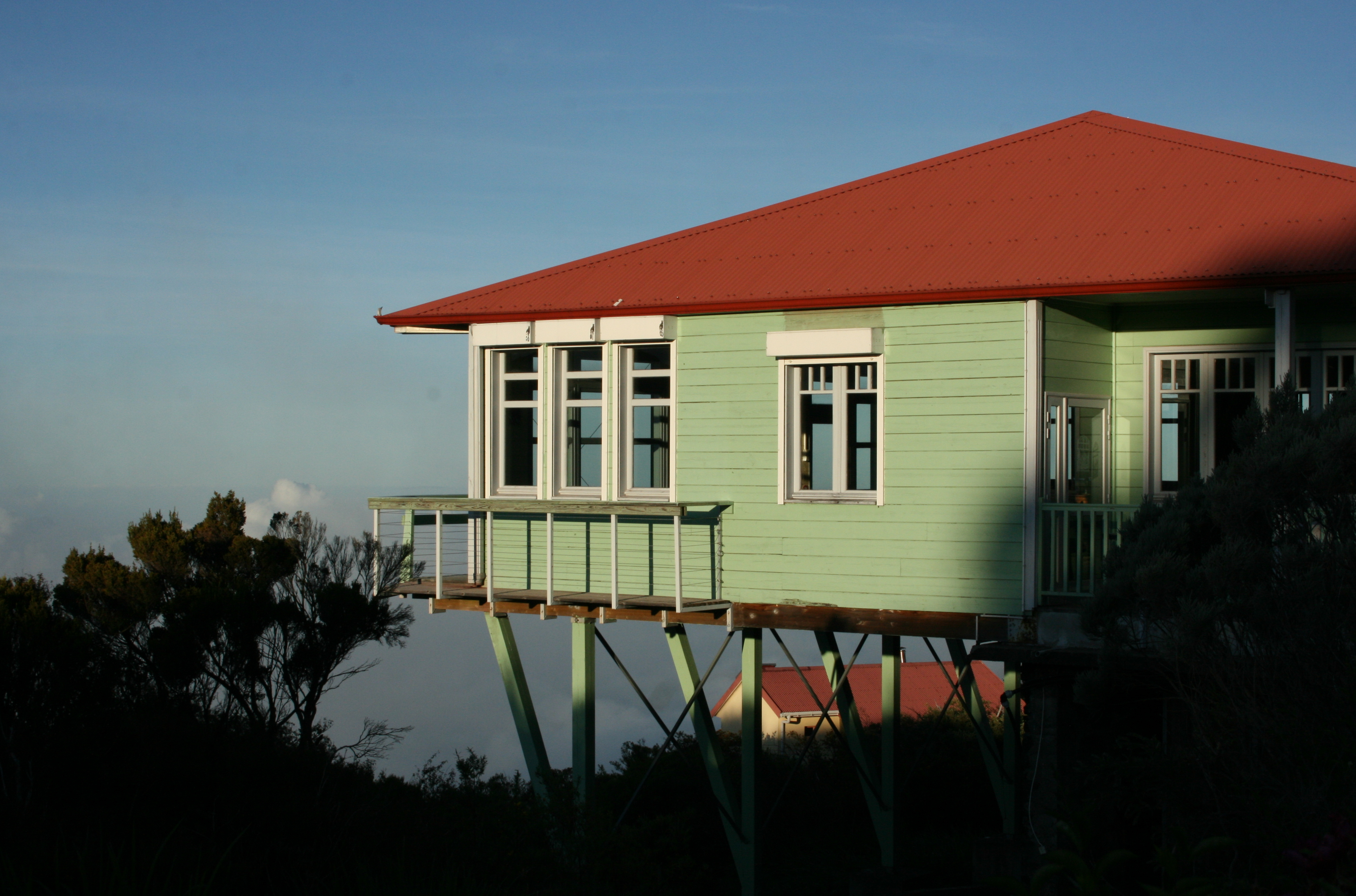
Gîte du Volcan in Réunion

A gîte or gite (French pronunciation: [ʒit]) is, typically, a holiday rental home in France, but there are many interpretations of the term 'gîte'. They range from gîtes d'etape — a hostel, for walkers and cyclists — to a gîte rural, a holiday home in the country available for rent, often an accessory dwelling unit. The term gîte originally meant quite simply a form of shelter. Gîtes d'etape, which resemble mountain huts or youth hostel, usually provide meals and have dormitory accommodation. They are found along Grande Randonnée long distance trails. The holiday homes type are fully furnished and equipped for self-catering. Some owners may also provide meals.

It is often suggested that a gite is a property whose owner lives nearby and can provide a warm welcome to guests, but the word is frequently used (or misused) in a much wider sense. Gîtes are generally old farmworkers' cottages or converted outbuildings and barns. This type of holiday accommodation is sometimes regarded as "basic"' in terms of facilities; however, most gîtes are generally very well kept, and a growing number will have fully fitted kitchens, en-suite bathrooms, TV, DVD, and access to a swimming pool or other sporting activities. The term gîte encompasses most forms of holiday cottage and even holiday flats or apartments. Many gîtes will also accept pets.

Some gîtes do not provide linen as standard, so many gîte holidaymakers take their linen with them. However, many gîte owners do include linen at least as an option.

Gîtes are encouraged by the local tourist board and planning authorities since they attract investment and tourism.

Gîte owners are required to ensure that their gîtes are safe and comply with the necessary rules, regulations, and insurance requirements.

In French-speaking regions of Europe, there are several associations of gîte owners.

Gîtes de France is an organization where people can rent gîtes in France.

== Etymology ==
The noun "gite" is an antiquated past participle of the verb gésir, meaning "to lie down." It is descended from the Latin word jacere, with the same meaning. Under the French Orthographic Reform of 1990, the official spelling was changed to "gite." The Académie française considers both spellings acceptable, and the older spelling continues to be standard.

== Gîte types ==
Gîte Rural
Offers self-catering accommodation located in the countryside, by the sea, or in the mountains. The gîte is completely self-contained with one or more bedrooms, a lounge or dining room, a kitchen and bathroom facilities.
Gîtes d'Enfants
Holidays for children. During the school holidays host families provide lodging for children of various ages with a wide variety of activities. Children's gîtes are regulated and inspected to ensure a safe and secure environment for each child.
Gîtes d'Etape
Stopover and holiday getaways off the beaten track for groups of walkers or cyclists.
Gîte Equestre
A staging post for people or groups travelling across France on horseback; or gîte offering stabling for horses.
Chalets-Loisirs
A complex of wooden cottages set in the countryside providing various activities, such as, fishing, horse-riding, archery, cycling.

Chambre d'Hôtes
Bed and breakfast the French way. Stay as a guest in a private home with a full breakfast provided. Some hosts offer Table d'Hôtes (table service) which provide half board or full board service. If Table d'Hôtes is not available there is usually a local restaurant available for evening meals.

The term "gîte" is sometimes confused with "chambre d'hôtes", but in fact the two are different. A "chambre d'hôtes" is necessarily lived in by the service provider and breakfast served each morning. A "gîte" is a holiday home in an independent building and will always be self catering. A chambre d'hôtes thus is more akin to a bed and breakfast.

== See also ==
- casa de turismo rural in Portugal
