= Francis Aungier, 1st Earl of Longford =

English politician and administrator

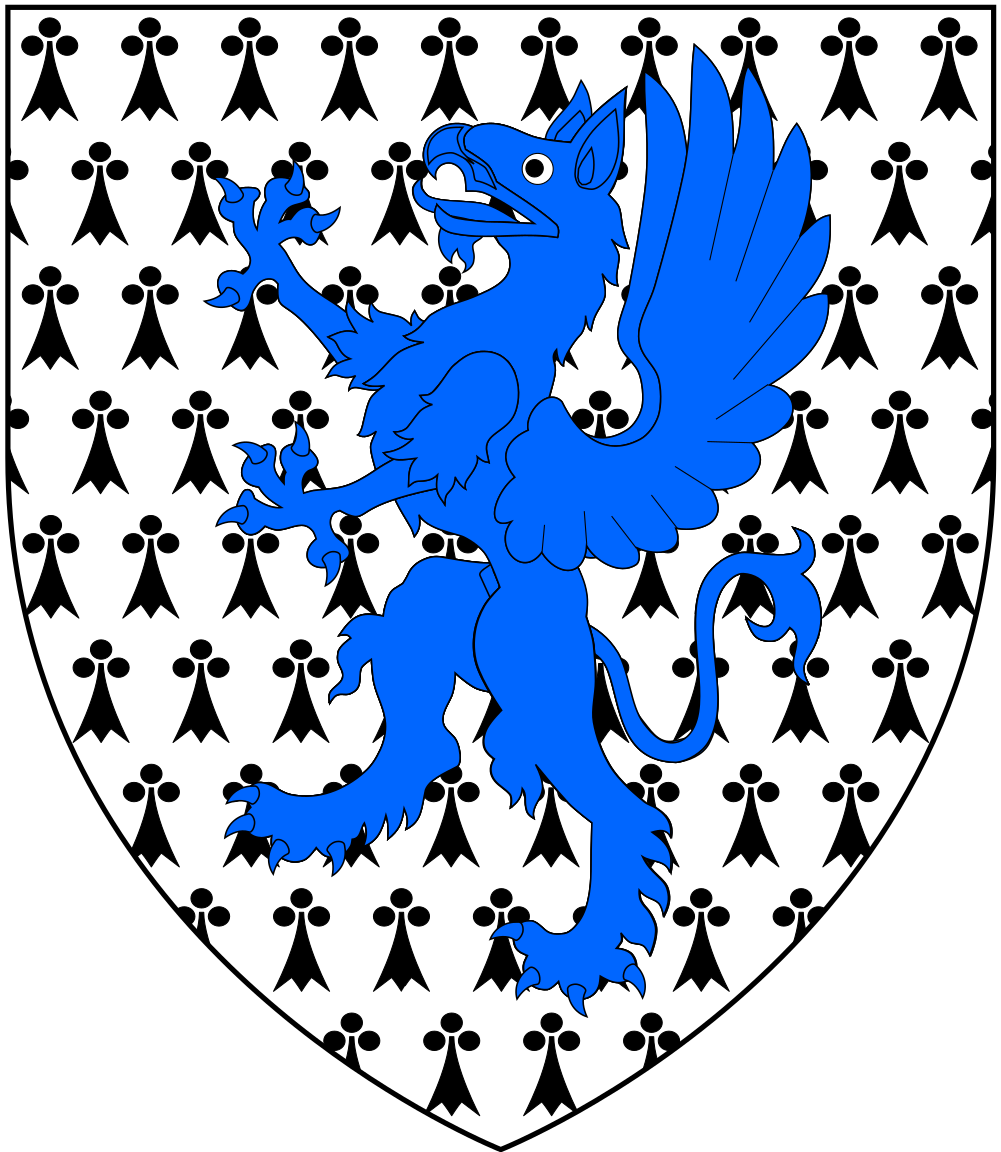
Arms of Aungier: Ermine, a griffin segreant azure

Francis Aungier, 1st Earl of Longford PC (Ire) (ca. 1632 – 23 December 1700) was an English politician, who sat in the House of Commons from 1660 to 1679. He was an administrator in Ireland.

Aungier was the eldest son of Ambrose Aungier, Chancellor of St Patrick's Cathedral, Dublin 1636-1654, and his wife Grizzell Bulkeley, daughter of Lancelot Bulkeley, Archbishop of Dublin 1619-1650. The Aungier family originated from Cambridgeshire, but his grandfather married into the family of the Fitzgerald Earls of Kildare in 1584, and was appointed Master of the Rolls in Ireland in 1609, after which he became settled in Ireland. Aungier inherited the Barony on the death of his uncle, Gerald Aungier, 2nd Baron Aungier of Longford, in 1655.

Aungier inherited some property in Surrey, and in 1660, he was elected Member of Parliament for Surrey in the Convention Parliament. In 1661 he was appointed governor of Westmeath and Longford. He was elected MP for Arundel in 1661 and sat until 1679. He was created Viscount Longford in the Peerage of Ireland in 1675 and Earl of Longford in 1677. In 1689 Longford was one of the few Irish Protestant peers to participate in the Irish Parliament called by James II, but he later became reconciled to William of Orange.

Aungier married firstly Jane Carr, daughter of Sir Edward Carr of Hillingdon and secondly Anne daughter of Arthur Chichester, 1st Earl of Donegall and widow of John Butler, 1st Earl of Gowran. He had no children and was succeeded by special remainder in his titles by his brother Ambrose, who died in 1705, and with whom the earldom of Longford became extinct.

Parliament of England
Preceded by Sir Theophilus Jones; Henry Owen	Member of Parliament for King's County, Longford and Westmeath; 1659; With: Sir Henry Piers	Succeeded by Parliament of Ireland restored
Vacant	Member of Parliament for Surrey; 1660–1661; With: Daniel Harvey	Succeeded by Adam Browne; Sir Edmund Bowyer
Preceded by The Earl of Orrery; John Trevor	Member of Parliament for Arundel; 1661–1679; With: The Earl of Orrery	Succeeded by William Garway; James Butler
Peerage of Ireland
New creation	Earl of Longford; 1677–1700	Succeeded by Ambrose Aungier
New creation	Viscount Longford; 1675–1700	Succeeded by Ambrose Aungier
Preceded by Gerald Aungier	Baron Aungier of Longford; 1655–1700	Succeeded by Ambrose Aungier
