= Thomas Pakenham (Augher MP) =

Irish barrister and politician

Sir Thomas Pakenham (1649–1703) was an Irish barrister and politician: he sat in the Irish House of Commons as MP for Augher and held the office of Serjeant-at-law (Ireland). He was the grandfather of the first Baron Longford.

He was the eldest son of Henry Pakenham, of Pakenham Hall, County Westmeath, and his first wife Mary Lill, daughter of Robert Lill of Trim, County Meath and Eleanor, sister of James Ussher, Archbishop of Armagh. The Pakenham family, who were originally from Suffolk, had come to Ireland about 1575, in the entourage of Sir Henry Sidney, the Lord Deputy of Ireland, to whom they were related. The family acquired substantial lands in Westmeath and County Wexford.

He was educated at Trinity College Dublin and entered Lincoln's Inn in 1674. He was called to the Irish Bar and became King's Counsel in 1685.

As a barrister he was held in high regard, and enjoyed the patronage of Charles Porter, the Lord Chancellor of Ireland. In 1692 he was recommended for promotion to be one of the three serjeants-at-law, being described by Porter as "the fittest that can be picked on for the King's service". He became Second Serjeant in that year, with a knighthood, and was made Prime Serjeant in 1695, on Porter's recommendation, holding that office until his death in 1703. He was MP for Augher from 1695 to 1699.

He married firstly in 1673 to Mary Nelmes, daughter of Richard Nelmes, an Alderman of London. He married secondly in 1696 Mary Bellingham, daughter of Sir Daniel Bellingham, first of the Bellingham Baronets of Dubber, who had been created the first Lord Mayor of Dublin in 1665; her mother was Jane Barlow, daughter of Richard Barlow of Cheshire. Thomas had at least six children by his first marriage, including:

Edward Pakenham (died 1721), his eldest son, who married Margaret Bradestan, daughter of John Bradestan, (who married secondly Reverend Ossory Medlicott of Ticehurst, Sussex), and was the father of:

- Thomas Pakenham, 1st Baron Longford.

Sir Thomas also had four younger sons, Thomas, Philip, Henry and Robert, and a daughter, Frances, who married George Nugent of Castlerichard, County Louth.

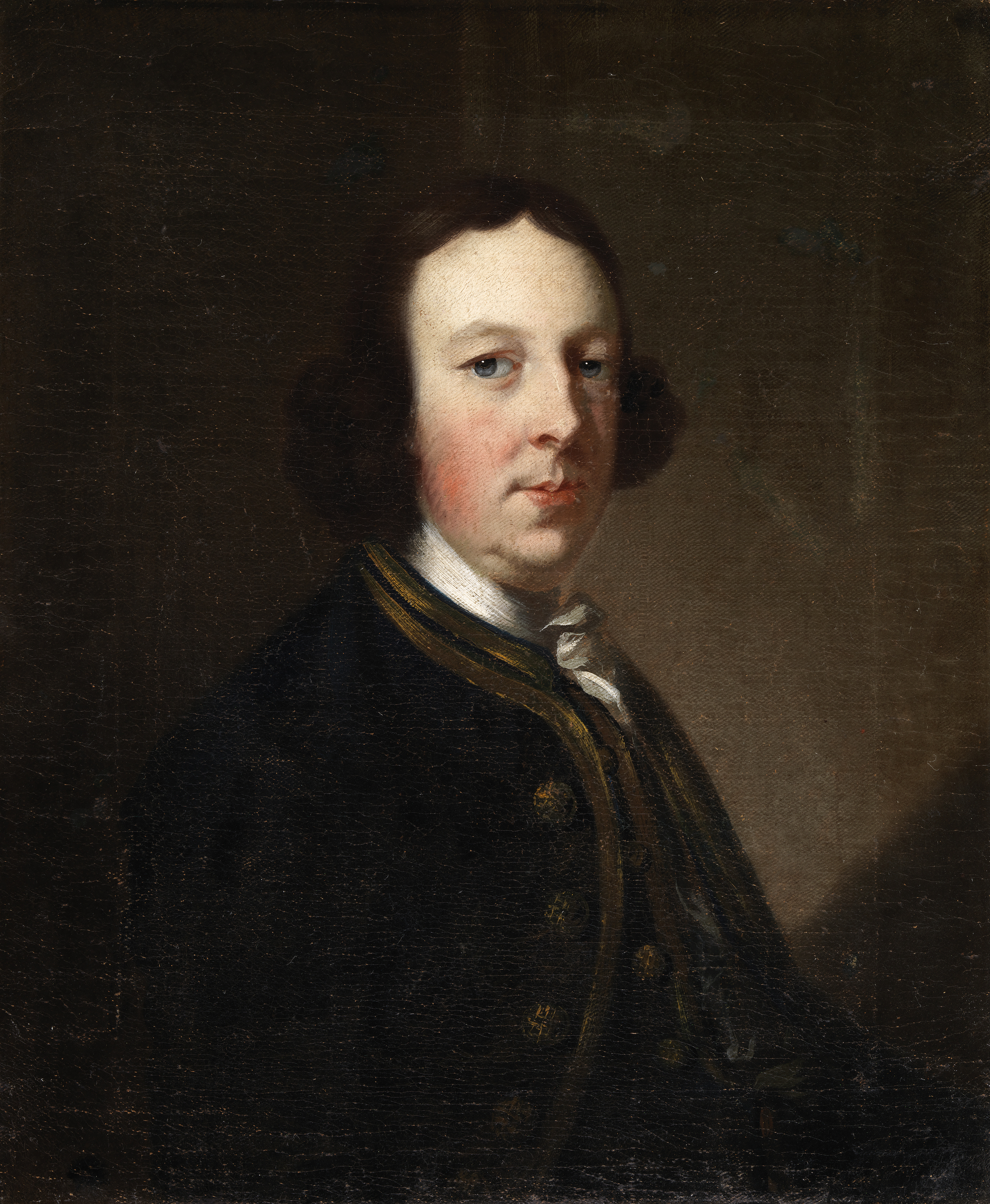
Pakenham's grandson Thomas, 1st Baron Longford
