= Pakenham's Case =

Property law

Pakenham's Case, Y.B. 42 Ed. III 3, pl. 14, was an English case from the times of Edward III, referring to a property in Pabenham or Pavenham, that held that the owner of a manor could enforce a covenant that had been made with the previous owner of the manor. The covenant was that a convent and prior would sing in the manor chapel every week. Pakenham's case has been cited in other cases concerning servitude.
