= Tullynally Castle =

Irish country house

Coordinates: 53°41′00″N 7°19′40″W

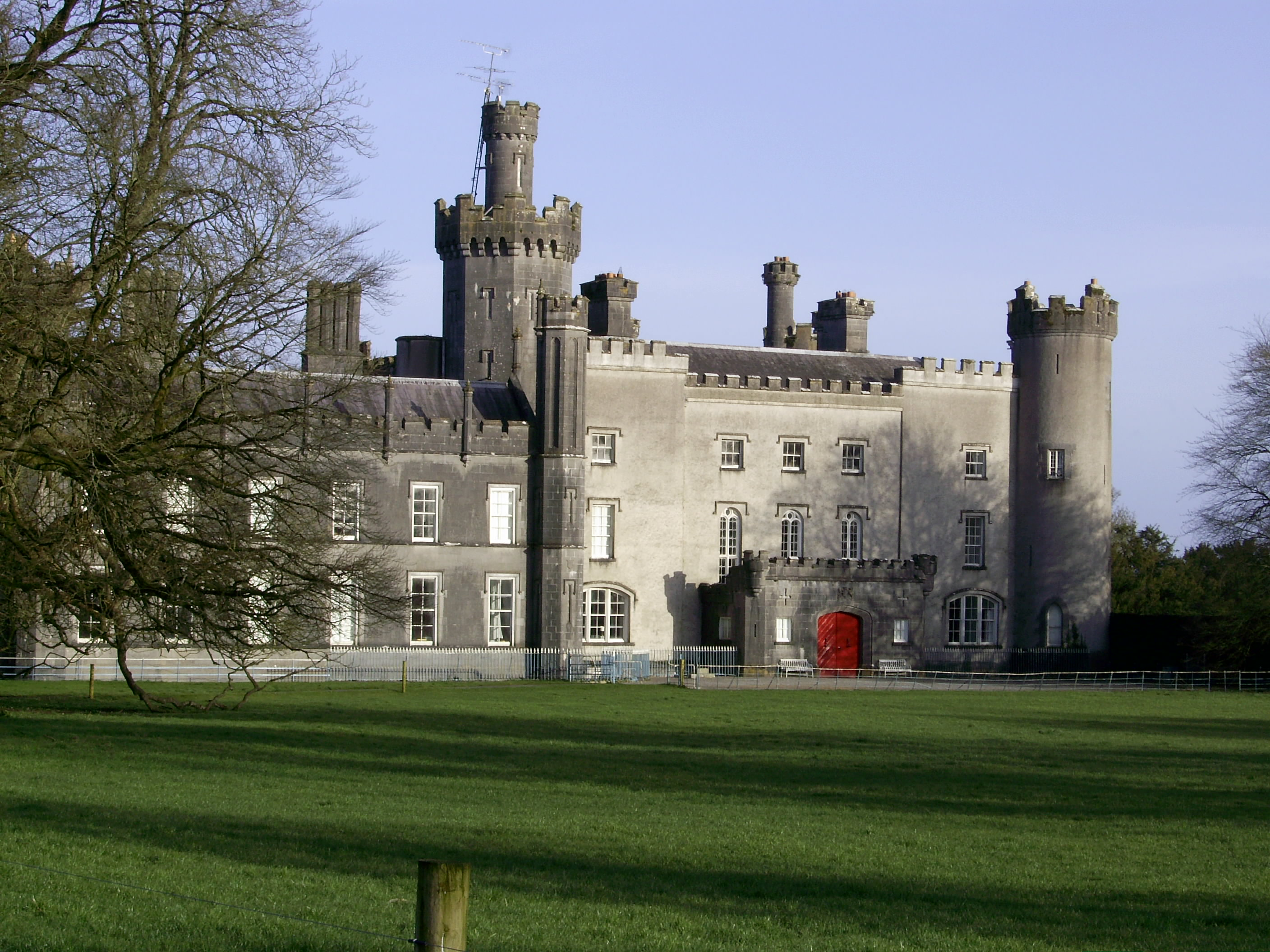
Tullynally Castle, near Castlepollard. Also known as Pakenham Hall

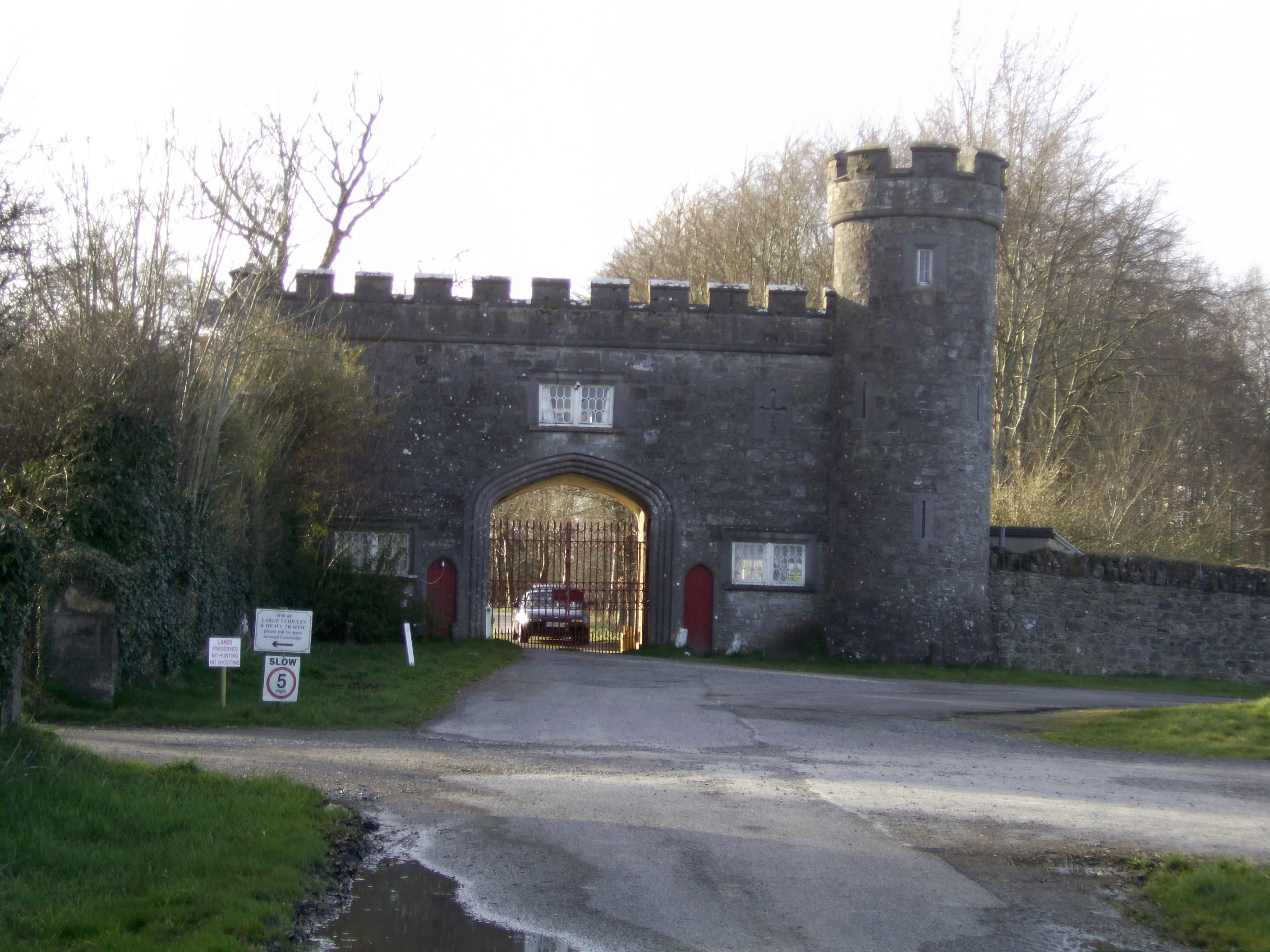
Castle entrance gateway

Tullynally Castle, also known as Pakenham Hall, is a country house situated some 2 km from Castlepollard on the Coole village road in County Westmeath, Ireland. The Gothic-style building has over 120 rooms and has been home to the Pakenham family (now the Earls of Longford) for over 350 years.

The house is surrounded by twelve acres of parkland and gardens, including woodland gardens and walled gardens laid out in the early 19th century with a limestone grotto and ornamental lakes. In the 21st century, a Chinese garden with a pagoda and a Tibetan garden of waterfalls and streams have been added.

The site entrance from the public road is situated 1.5 km outside Castlepollard on the Granard road 20 km from Mullingar, 80 km from Dublin via the N4 or N3 roads. The grounds are open to the public from April to September.

== History ==
In 1665 Henry Pakenham, a captain in the Parliamentary Dragoons, was granted land in lieu of pay arrears that included Tullynally. His grandson Thomas was created the 1st Baron Longford in 1756. Thomas's grandson, another Thomas and 3rd Baron Longford, also inherited the superior title of 2nd Earl of Longford in January 1794 from his grandmother, The 1st Countess of Longford.

The 2nd Earl remodelled the 17th-century house in the Gothic Revival style in the early nineteenth-century, adding towers and a moat. It was by then larger than any other castellated house in Ireland. Since then, the house has passed down through successive generations of Pakenhams to the present head of the family, The 8th Earl of Longford, and is the largest house in private hands in Ireland.

The senior British Army commander, General Sir Edward Pakenham, GCB, was born and brought up in the house. His elder sister, Kitty, was married to Major-General Sir Arthur Wellesley in 1806. Wellesley subsequently became Field Marshal The 1st Duke of Wellington.

== Other Westmeath castles ==
- Ballinlough Castle
- Delvin Castle
- Killua Castle
- Knockdrin Castle
- Tyrrellspass Castle
