= Casa rural =

Type of tourist accommodation in Spain

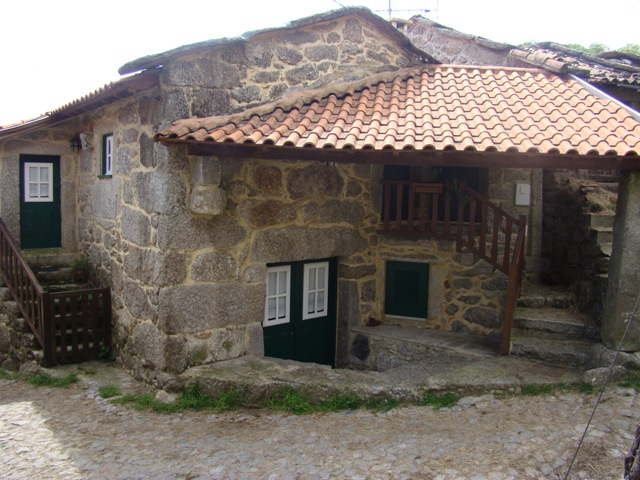
A casa de turismo rural in Terras de Bouro, Braga, Portugal

A casa rural (Spanish; meaning "country house") or casa de pagès (Catalan) is a form of basic self-catering tourist accommodation in Spain equivalent to gîtes in France. The casas rurales may be rented by the building or by the room. Most casas rurales belong to owner associations.

In Portugal the same class of accommodation is called casa de turismo rural.
