= Thomas Pakenham, 1st Baron Longford =

Anglo-Irish politician (1713–1766)

The Right Honourable The Lord Longford
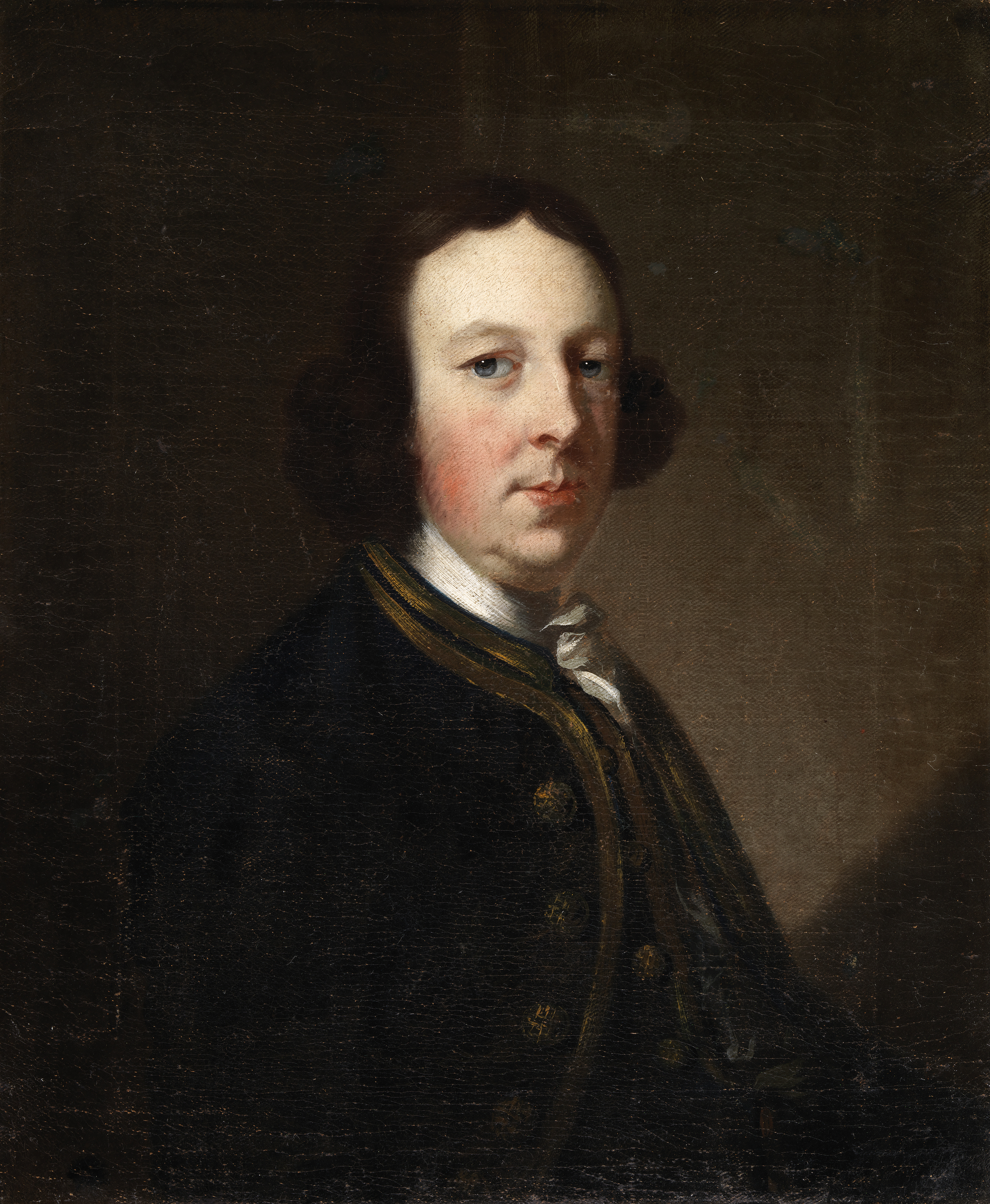
- c. 1756 portrait

Member of Parliament for Longford Borough
- In office 1745–1757 Serving with Richard Edgeworth
- Preceded by: Michael Cuffe; Richard Edgeworth
- Succeeded by: Roger Hall; Richard Edgeworth

Personal details
- Born: May 1713 County Westmeath, Ireland
- Died: 30 April 1766 (aged 52)
- Spouse: Elizabeth Pakenham, 1st Countess of Longford (m. 1739)
- Relations: Sir Thomas Pakenham (grandfather)
- Children: 7
- Parent(s): Edward Pakenham; Margaret Bradestan Pakenham

Thomas Pakenham, 1st Baron Longford (May 1713 – 30 April 1766) was an Anglo-Irish politician.

== Early life ==
He was born in May 1713 at Pakenham Hall, County Westmeath, Ireland, eldest son of Edward Pakenham and Margaret Bradestan.

His maternal grandfather was John Bradestan and his paternal grandfather was Sir Thomas Pakenham, the Prime Serjeant.

After his father's death, his mother remarried Reverend Ossory Medlicott, vicar of Ticehurst, Sussex.

== Career ==
Between 1745 and 1757, Pakenham represented Longford Borough in the Irish House of Commons.

On 22 February 1605, grants of Market and Fair for Longford were given to Lord Baron Delvin by the King. Licence to hold a Thursday market and fair on the 1st of August, and two days at Longford, with the usual courts and fees.

In 1552, King Edward VI granted lands of Annalye (County Longford) to Baron Delvin including the Holy Island and lands of the O'Ferralls.

In 1556–57, Philip and Mary made grants to Lord Baron Delvin of the northern County Longford region before the county became County Longford.

King James I also granted to Lord Baron Delvin the Island and monastery of Inchemore in what is now County Longford, otherwise Inismore, in the Annalie.

King James did grant Lord Baron Delvin about 1/2 of the County Longford in a massive grant of lands and castles including Castles Newton, Lisnovoa, and Monilagan. The grant was mostly surrendered in 1607 for compensation of 100 pounds per year and other lands.

== Personal life ==
In 1739, Pakenham was married to Elizabeth Cuffe (1719–1794), the only daughter and sole heiress of Michael Cuffe, MP. Elizabeth later became suo jure 1st Countess of Longford, and in 1756 Pakenham was created the 1st Baron Longford because his wife was the grand-niece and heiress of Ambrose Aungier, 2nd Earl of Longford, who had died without issue. Together, they had seven children, four sons and three daughters:

- Edward Michael Pakenham, 2nd Baron Longford (1743–1792), who married Hon. Catherine Rowley, second daughter of Hercules Langford Rowley MP and Elizabeth Rowley, 1st Viscountess Langford.
- Lady Frances Pakenham (1744–1776), who married John Ormsby Vandeleur of Maddenstown.
- Lady Helena Pakenham (1745–1777), who married William Sherlock (1745–1788) of Sherlockstown, County Kildare.
- Capt. Hon. Robert Pakenham (d. 1775), MP for County Longford from 1768 to 1775.
- Lady Mary Pakenham (1749–1775), who married Thomas Fortescue, MP for Trim.
- Hon. William Pakenham (1756–1769), who died unmarried.
- Adm. Hon. Sir Thomas Pakenham (1757–1836), who married Louisa Anne Staples (d. 1833), eldest daughter of John Staples, MP, and granddaughter of William James Conolly.

Pakenham died on 30 April 1766 at the age of 52. Upon his death, their son, Edward, became the 2nd Baron Longford. The first baron's fourth son was Admiral Sir Thomas Pakenham.

Parliament of Ireland
Preceded by Michael Cuffe; Richard Edgeworth	Member of Parliament for Longford Borough; 1745–1757; With: Richard Edgeworth	Succeeded by Roger Hall; Richard Edgeworth
Peerage of Ireland
New creation	Baron Longford; 1756–1766	Succeeded by Edward Pakenham
