= Edward Pakenham =

British Army officer and politician (1778–1815)

Major-General The Honourable Sir Edward Pakenham GCB
- Portrait by Thomas Heaphy, c. 1813–1814

Member of the Irish Parliament for Longford Borough
- In office 1799–1800
- Preceded by: Thomas Pakenham
- Succeeded by: Thomas Pakenham

Personal details
- Born: Edward Michael Pakenham; 19 March 1778 Pakenham Hall, County Westmeath, Ireland
- Died: 8 January 1815 (aged 36) St. Bernard Parish, Louisiana, U.S.
- Resting place: St. Etchen's Church, Killucan; 53°30′49.5″N 7°08′40.3″W
- Relations: The Duke of Wellington (brother-in-law); The Duchess of Wellington (sister)
- Parents: The Baron Longford; Lady Catherine Pakenham
- Civilian awards: Knights Grand Cross of the Order of the Bath

Military service
- Allegiance: Great Britain; United Kingdom
- Branch/service: British Army
- Years of service: 1794–1815
- Rank: Major general
- Unit: 100th Regiment of Foot; 23rd Light Dragoons
- Battles/wars: French Revolutionary Wars; Irish Rebellion of 1798; Napoleonic Wars; Battle of Copenhagen (1807); Invasion of Martinique (1809); Peninsular War; Battle of Bussaco; Battle of Fuentes de Oñoro; Battle of Salamanca; Battle of the Pyrenees; Battle of Nivelle; Battle of the Nive; Battle of Orthez; Battle of Toulouse (1814); War of 1812; Battle of New Orleans †
- Military awards: Army Gold Cross

Major-General Sir Edward Michael Pakenham, GCB (19 March 1778 – 8 January 1815) was a British Army officer and politician. He was the son of the Baron Longford and the brother-in-law of the Duke of Wellington, with whom he served in the Peninsular War. During the War of 1812, he was the commander of British forces attempting to take the Southern port of New Orleans (1814–15). On 8 January 1815, Pakenham was killed in action while leading his men at the Battle of New Orleans.

== Early life ==
Edward Michael Pakenham was born on 19 March 1778 at Pakenham Hall (present-day Tullynally Castle) in County Westmeath, Ireland, to Edward Pakenham, 2nd Baron Longford, and his wife Catherine Rowley. He was educated at The Royal School, Armagh. His family purchased a commission for him as a lieutenant in the 100th (Gordon Highlanders) Regiment of Foot in 1794 when he was only sixteen.

== Political career ==
Between 1799 and 1800, Pakenham also represented Longford Borough in the Irish House of Commons.

== Military career ==
Pakenham served with the 23rd Light Dragoons against the French in Ireland during the Irish Rebellion of 1798 and later in Nova Scotia, Barbados, and Saint Croix. He led his men in an attack on Saint Lucia in 1803, where he was wounded. He also fought in the Battle of Copenhagen in 1807 and the invasion of Martinique in 1809, where he received another wounding. In 1806, his sister Catherine married Arthur Wellesley, the future Duke of Wellington.

=== Peninsular War ===
Pakenham, as adjutant-general, joined his well known in-law, the Duke of Wellington, in the Peninsular War. He commanded a regiment in the Battle of Bussaco in 1810 and in 1811 fought in the Battle of Fuentes de Oñoro to defend the besieged fortress of Almeida, helping to secure a British victory. In 1812 he was praised for his performance at the Battle of Salamanca in which he commanded the 3rd Division and hammered onto the flank of the extended French line. He also received the Army Gold Cross and clasps for the battles of Martinique, Busaco, Fuentes de Oñoro, Salamanca, Pyrenees, Nivelle, Nive, Orthez, and Toulouse.

=== War of 1812 ===
==== Louisiana campaign ====
In September 1814, Pakenham, having been promoted to the rank of major general, accepted an offer to replace General Robert Ross as commander of British troops in North America after Ross was killed during the skirmishing prior to the Battle of North Point near Baltimore.

In August 1814, Vice Admiral Cochrane had finally convinced the Admiralty that a campaign against New Orleans would weaken American resolve against Canada, and hasten a successful end to the war. (Note: Gene Allen Smith makes reference to a letter from the Secretary of the Admiralty to Cochrane dated August 10, 1814, archive reference WO 1/141. A copy of this document is accessible at The Historic New Orleans Collection' resource center, via microfilm. Smith also mentions how several Royal Navy officers had already suggested the idea of attacking Louisiana.) The Royal Navy had begun the Louisiana Campaign to capture New Orleans.

In the winter of 1814, the British had the objective of gaining control of the entrance of the Mississippi, and to challenge the legality of the Louisiana Purchase. To this end, an expeditionary force of about 8,000 troops under General Edward Pakenham had arrived in the Gulf Coast, to attack New Orleans.

A general ceasefire had already been declared by the Treaty of Ghent, signed on 24 December 1814, but as peace was not yet ratified in Washington as required by the treaty, the two nations were still formally at war. The news of the treaty did not reach the combatants until February, several weeks after the battle. (Note: "Then in mid-February dispatches arrived from Europe announcing that the commissioners in Ghent had signed a treaty of peace with their British counterparts and that the War of 1812 had ended." "the Senate of the United States unanimously (35-0) ratified the Treaty of Ghent on 16 February 1815. Now the war was officially over.")

==== British reconnaissance-in-force ====
On Christmas Day, Pakenham arrived on the battlefield. He ordered a reconnaissance-in-force on 28 December against the earthworks. The reconnaissance-in-force was designed to test Line Jackson and see how well-defended it was, and if any section of the line was weak the British would take advantage of the situation, break through, and call for thousands of more soldiers to smash through the defences. Pakenham inexplicably decided to withdraw all the soldiers after seeing the left side of his reconnaissance-in-force collapsing and retreating in panic.

After the failure of this operation Pakenham met with General Keane and Admiral Cochrane that evening for an update on the situation. Pakenham wanted to use Chef Menteur Pass as the invasion route, but he was overruled by Admiral Cochrane, who insisted that his boats were providing everything needed. Admiral Cochrane believed that the veteran British soldiers would easily destroy Jackson's ramshackle army, and he allegedly said that if the army did not do it, his sailors would, and the meeting settled the method and place of the attack.

==== Artillery duel on New Year's Day 1815 ====
The main British army arrived on New Year's Day 1815 and began an artillery bombardment of the American earthworks. The Americans recovered quickly and mobilized their own artillery to fire back at the British artillery. This began an exchange of artillery fire that continued for three hours. After yet another failure to breach Line Jackson Pakenham decided to wait for his entire force of 8,000 men to assemble before continuing his attack.

==== New Orleans ====
Pakenham developed a complex plan, dividing his forces into four brigades:

1. Colonel Thornton would land soldiers on the Right Bank of the Mississippi, capture the artillery battery, so the guns could be turned against Jackson's lines.
2. The main assault against the left-centre of the American line on the Left Bank would be undertaken by Major General Gibbs.
3. Light troops would be deployed to breach the right, followed by a Brigade commanded by General Keane, to either exploit the success, or move against the centre.
4. General Lambert and his brigade were in reserve.

In front of the American line on the Left Bank, there were 600 metres of open ground to be traversed by the British.

Thornton failed to disembark and capture the battery at the designated time. Pakenham summoned his Assistant Adjutant General (AAG), Major Harry Smith, and informed him Thornton's delayed troops would have no impact upon the main attack on the Left Bank. Smith tried to dissuade him from proceeding, but to no avail. Pakenham decided to continue with the attack, half an hour before daylight, at 6.20am.

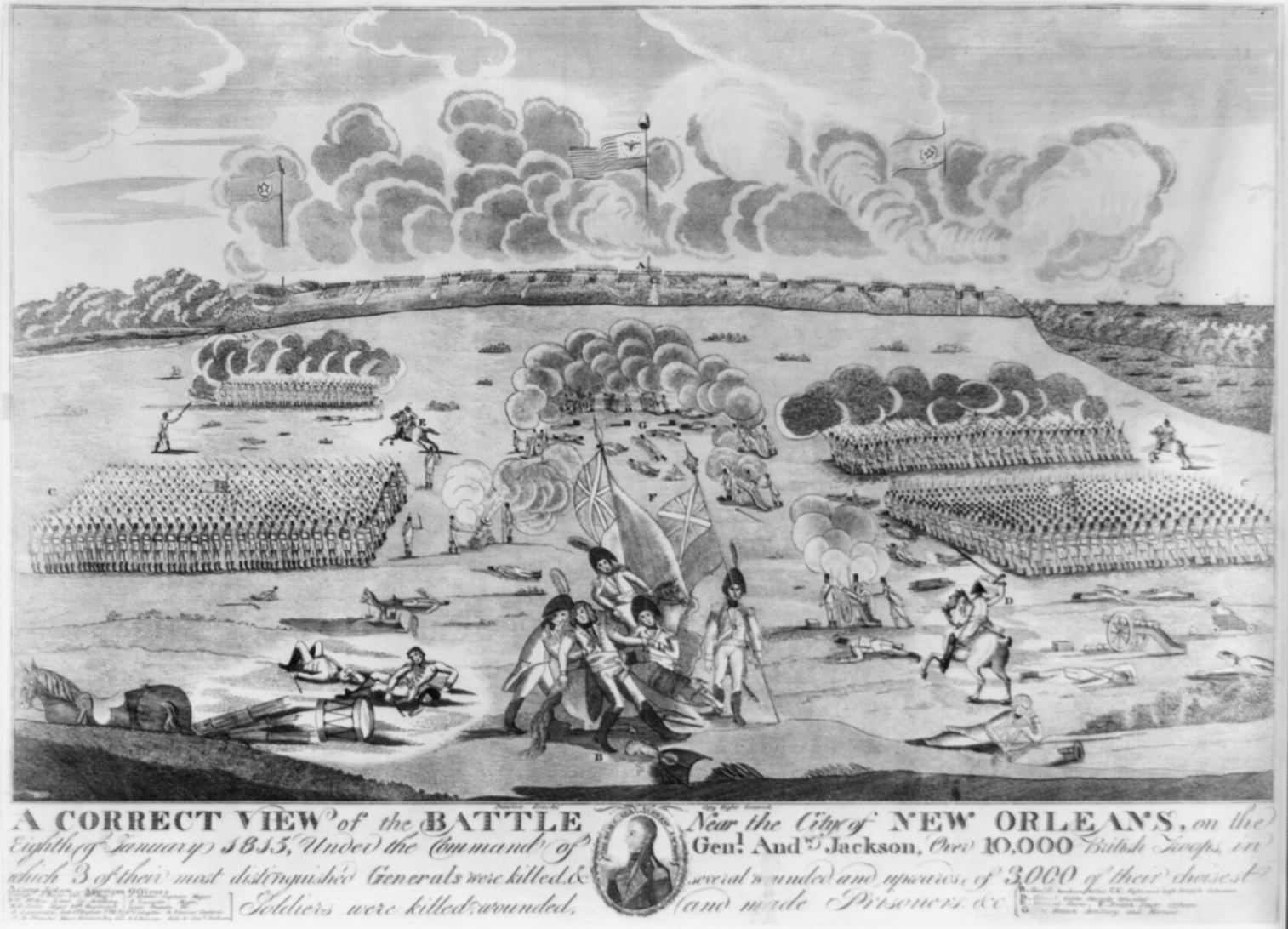
A lithograph by Francisco Scacki, created a few years after the battle. The mortal wounding of Pakenham at the Battle of New Orleans in the centre clearly influenced a later engraving by F. O. C. Darley, dating from 1860. These Bearskin cap bedecked British soldiers are wearing trousers, which Darley would replace with kilts in his version.

The 44th Foot, commanded by Thomas Mullins, was assigned to lead the assault. They had to pick up the fascines and ladders needed, in order to cross the ditches and scale the earthworks respectively. Mullins was not pleased, viewing the regiment's role as that of a forlorn hope. Perhaps due to his bad temper, he failed to personally locate the ladders and fascines on the evening of the 7th, as Pakenham had ordered him to do. The officer he assigned, Lieutenant Colonel Johnston, inquired about their location from Captain Emmett, an engineer officer, and reported they were in the advance redoubt.

During the night, an advance battery was set up about 880 yards (800 m) forward of the advance redoubt. Mullins, thinking this to be the location of the materiel, passed the advance redoubt and halted the regiment at the battery. Upon discovering his mistake, he sent about 300 of his 427 men back to the redoubt at the double-quick to pick up the fascines and ladders, but it was too late. The other regiments were already advancing behind the 44th, the party of 300 lost formation as they struggled to reach the redoubt, and as day dawned, the attack commenced before the supplies could be brought forward.

The British column had already been disordered by the passage of the 300 returning to the redoubt, and they advanced into a storm of American fire. Without the fascines and ladders, they were unable to scale and storm the American position. Mullins had compromised their attack.

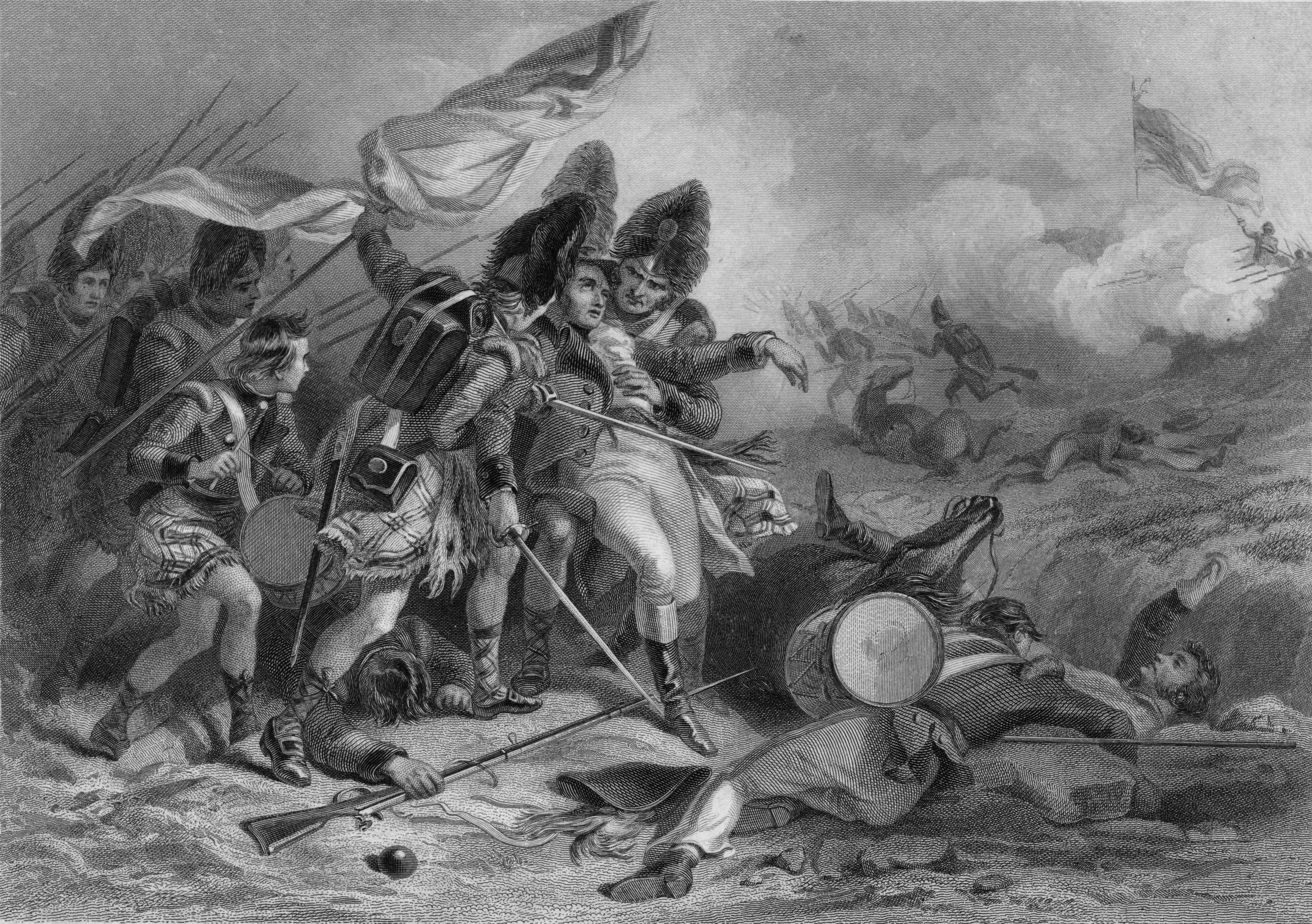
The Death of Pakenham at the Battle of New Orleans by F. O. C. Darley shows the death of Sir Edward Pakenham on 8 January 1815. This romanticised portrayal, dating from 1860, has British soldiers wearing Bearskin caps, a headdress not worn since the American Revolutionary War, with kilts, which were not worn in this battle.

As Pakenham rallied his troops near the enemy line, grapeshot from US artillery shattered his left knee and killed his horse. As he was helped to his feet by his senior aide-de-camp, Major Duncan MacDougall, Pakenham was wounded a second time in his right arm. After he mounted MacDougall's horse, more grapeshot ripped through his spine, fatally wounding him, and he was carried off the battlefield on a stretcher. He was 36. His last words were reputed to be telling MacDougall to find General John Lambert to tell him to assume command and send forward the reserves.

The British attacks on the Left Bank failed in bloody confusion, with Pakenham and Gibbs among the casualties.

The battle ended in defeat for the British.

Wellington had held Pakenham in high regard and was deeply saddened by news of his death, commenting:

We have but one consolation, that he fell as he lived, in the honourable discharge of his duty and distinguished as a soldier and a man. I cannot but regret that he was ever employed on such a service or with such a colleague. The expedition to New Orleans originated with that colleague... The Americans were prepared with an army in a fortified position which still would have been carried, if the duties of others, that is of the Admiral (Sir Alexander Cochrane), had been as well performed as that of he whom we now lament.

Patterson notes that the plan of attack was not Pakenham's own, yet he conceded to follow it, despite his reservations, and his death prevented him from reformulating a subsequent attack, following the initial failure.

== Legacy ==
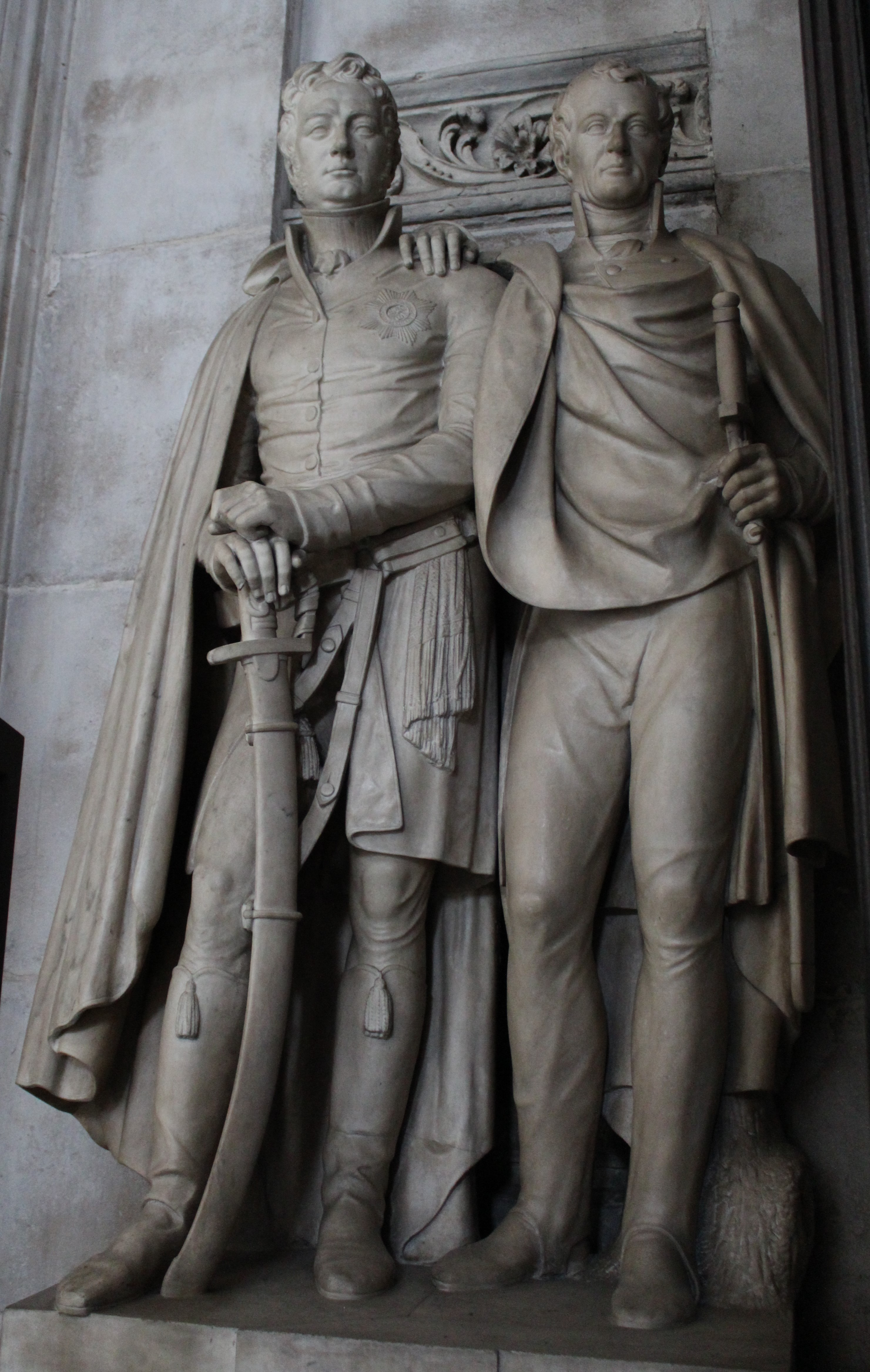
Generals Edward Pakenham and Samuel Gibbs Memorial, St. Paul's Cathedral

There is a statue in his memory at the south transept of St Paul's Cathedral in London. His body was returned in a cask of rum and buried in the Pakenham family vault in Killucan in County Westmeath, Ireland.

The village of Pakenham in Ontario, Canada, named in honour of his role in the War of 1812. The village is located on the Canadian Mississippi River which empties into the Ottawa River.

There is also a suburb of Melbourne, Australia, named after him.

In the alternative "British Version" of Johnny Horton's novelty hit "The Battle of New Orleans," Horton refers to the British being led into battle by Pakenham. As with other 'historic' details of the song, Horton haphazardly styles him as "Colonel Pakeningham" despite his actually being General Pakenham.

Two streets in Chalmette, Louisiana, the site of the Battle of New Orleans, are named for Pakenham, Packenham Avenue and Packenham Drive.

== See also ==
- List of knights companion of the Order of the Bath
- List of knights and dames grand cross of the Order of the Bath

Parliament of Ireland
Preceded by Thomas Pakenham; Henry Stewart	Member of Parliament for Longford Borough; 1799–1800; With: Thomas Pakenham	Succeeded by Thomas Pakenham; Thomas Borrowes
