= Viscount Langford =

Former title in the peerage of Ireland

Viscount Langford, of Longford Lodge, was a title in the Peerage of Ireland. It was created on 19 February 1766 for Elizabeth Rowley. She was made Baroness of Summerhill at the same time, also in the Peerage of Ireland. She was the wife of Hercules Langford Rowley, a member of the Irish Privy Council, grandson of Sir John Rowley and Mary, daughter of Sir Hercules Langford, 1st Baronet (see Langford baronets). She was succeeded by her son, the second Viscount. He represented County Antrim and Downpatrick in the Irish Parliament. The title became extinct in 1796 on the death of the second Viscount. The Rowley estates were inherited by Clotworthy Taylor, fourth son of Thomas Taylor, 1st Earl of Bective (whose eldest son was created Marquess of Headfort in 1800) by his wife Jane, daughter of Hercules Langford Rowley and the Viscountess Langford.

He assumed by Royal licence the surname of Rowley in 1796 and in 1800 the Langford title was revived when he was raised to the Peerage of Ireland as Baron Langford. This title is extinct since his death.

== Viscounts Langford (1766) ==
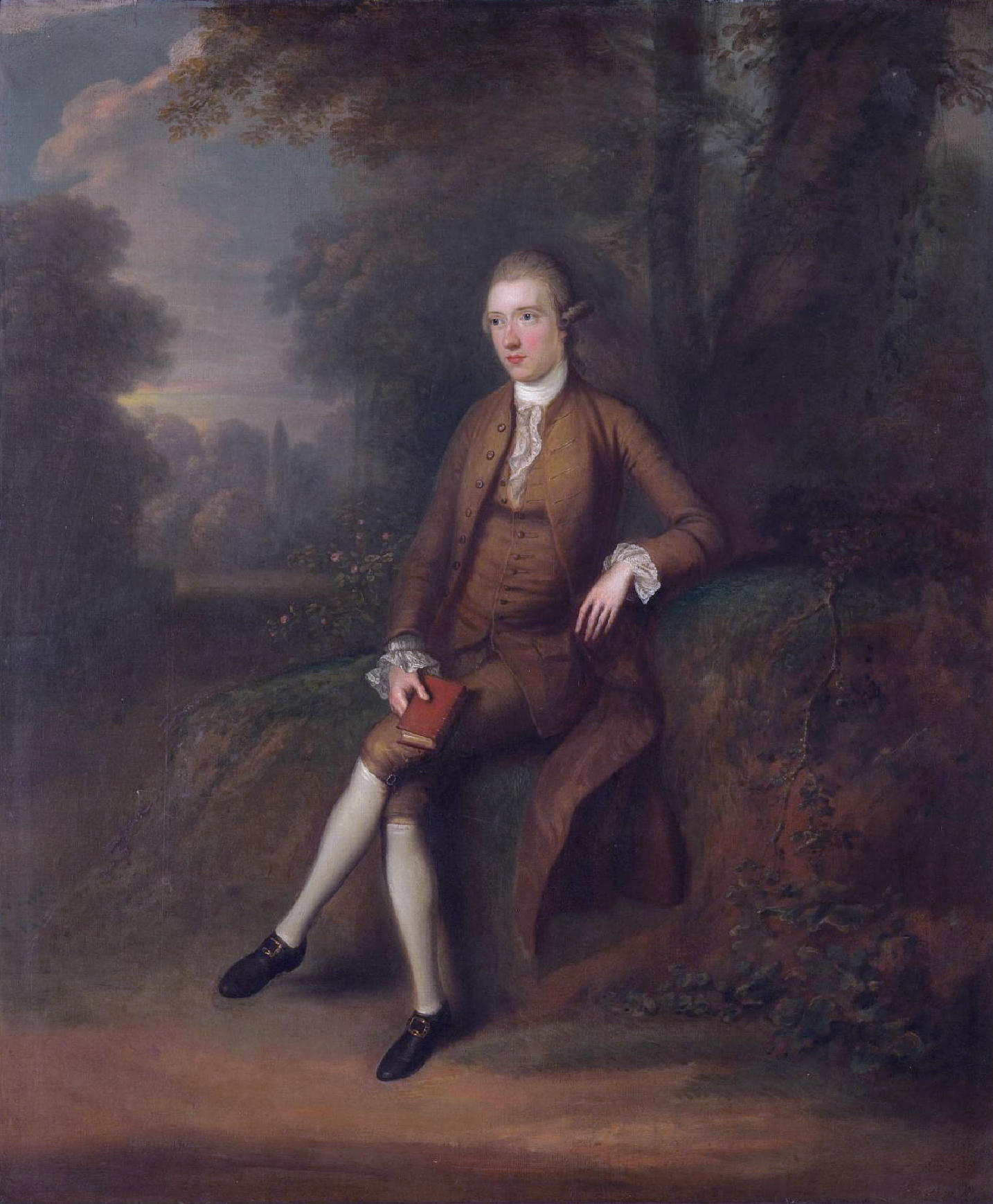
Hercules Rowley, 2nd Viscount Langford (Robert Hunter)

- Elizabeth Rowley, 1st Viscountess Langford (1713–1791). She was the daughter of Clotworthy Upton (1665−1725, MP in 1695 for the borough of Newton and in 1703 to his death; in June 1725 for the county of Antrim) and Jane Ormsby (daughter of John Ormsby MP of Limerick, born 1632 at Ballyvenogue, Limerick).
- Hercules Rowley, 2nd Viscount Langford (1737–1796)

== Family tree ==
Taylour and Rowley family tree including the Marquesses of Headfort and subsidiary titles

Thomas Taylour
Baronet of Kells, 1704
Thomas Taylor; 1662–1736; 1st Baronet
Viscount Langford and Baron of Summerhill, 1766
Elizabeth Rowley; 1713–1791; 1st Viscountess Langford, etc. m. Hercules Langford Rowley c. 1714–1794	Thomas Taylor; 1686–1757; 2nd Baronet	James Taylor; 1700–1747
Baron Headfort, 1760; Viscount Headfort, 1762; Earl of Bective, 1766
Hercules Rowley; 1737–1796; 2nd Viscount Langford, etc.	Jane Rowley	Thomas Taylour; 1724–1795; 1st Earl of Bective, etc., 3rd Baronet
Viscountcy Langford and Barony of Summerhill extinct, 1796
Marquess of Headfort, 1800	Baron Langford, 1800
Thomas Taylour; 1757–1829; 1st Marquess of Headfort, 2nd Earl of Bective, etc., 4th Baronet	Hercules Taylour; 1759–1790	Robert Taylour; 1760–1839	Clotworthy (né Taylo(u)r) Rowley; 1763–1825; 1st Baron Langford
Baron Kenlis, 1831
Thomas Taylour; 1787–1870; 2nd Marquess of Headfort, 3rd Earl of Bective, etc., 1st Baron Kenlis, 5th Baronet	Hercules Langford Rowley; 1795–1839; 2nd Baron Langford	Richard Thomas Rowley; 1812–1887
Thomas Taylour; 1822–1894; 3rd Marquess of Headfort, 4th Earl of Bective, etc., 2nd Baron Kenlis, 6th Baronet	Clotworthy Wellington William Robert Rowley; 1824–1854; 3rd Baron Langford	Hercules Langford Boyle Rowley; 1828–1904
Thomas Taylour; 1844–1893 styled Earl of Bective	Hercules Edward Rowley; 1848–1919; 4th Baron Langford	William Chambre Rowley; 1849–1931; 6th Baron Langford	Randolfe Thomas Rowley; 1852–1910	Conwy Grenville Hercules Rowley-Conwy; 1841–1900
Beatrix Taylour; 1877–1944 m. George Stanley; 1872–1938	Geoffrey Thomas Taylour; 1878–1943; 4th Marquess of Headfort, 5th Earl of Bective, etc., 3rd Baron Kenlis, 7th Baronet m. Rosie Boote; 1878–1958	John Hercules William Rowley; 1894–1922; 5th Baron Langford	Clotworthy Wellington Thomas Edward Rowley; 1885–1952; 7th Baron Langford	Arthur Sholto Langford Rowley; 1870–1953; 8th Baron Langford	Geoffrey Seymour Rowley-Conwy; 1877–1915
Terence Geoffrey Thomas Taylour; 1902–1960; 5th Marquess of Headfort, 6th Earl of Bective, etc., 4th Baron Kenlis, 8th Baronet	William Desmond Taylour; 1904–1989	Geoffrey Alexander Rowley-Conwy; 1912–2017; 9th Baron Langford
Thomas Geoffrey Charles Michael Taylour; 1932–2005; 6th Marquess of Headfort, 7th Earl of Bective, etc., 5th Baron Kenlis, 9th Baronet
Baronetage of Kells dormant, 2005
Thomas Michael Ronald Christopher Taylour b. 1959; 7th Marquess of Headfort, 8th Earl of Bective, etc., 6th Baron Kenlis	Peter Alexander Rowley-Conwy b. 1951	Owain Grenville Rowley-Conwy, 10th Baron Langford b. 1958; 10th Baron Langford
Thomas Rupert Charles Christopher Taylour b. 1989 styled Earl of Bective	Thomas Rowley-Conwy b. 1987
Hear apparent to the Headfort marquessate	Heir apparent to the Langford barony

== See also ==
- Langford baronets
- Baron Langford
