= Baron Langford =

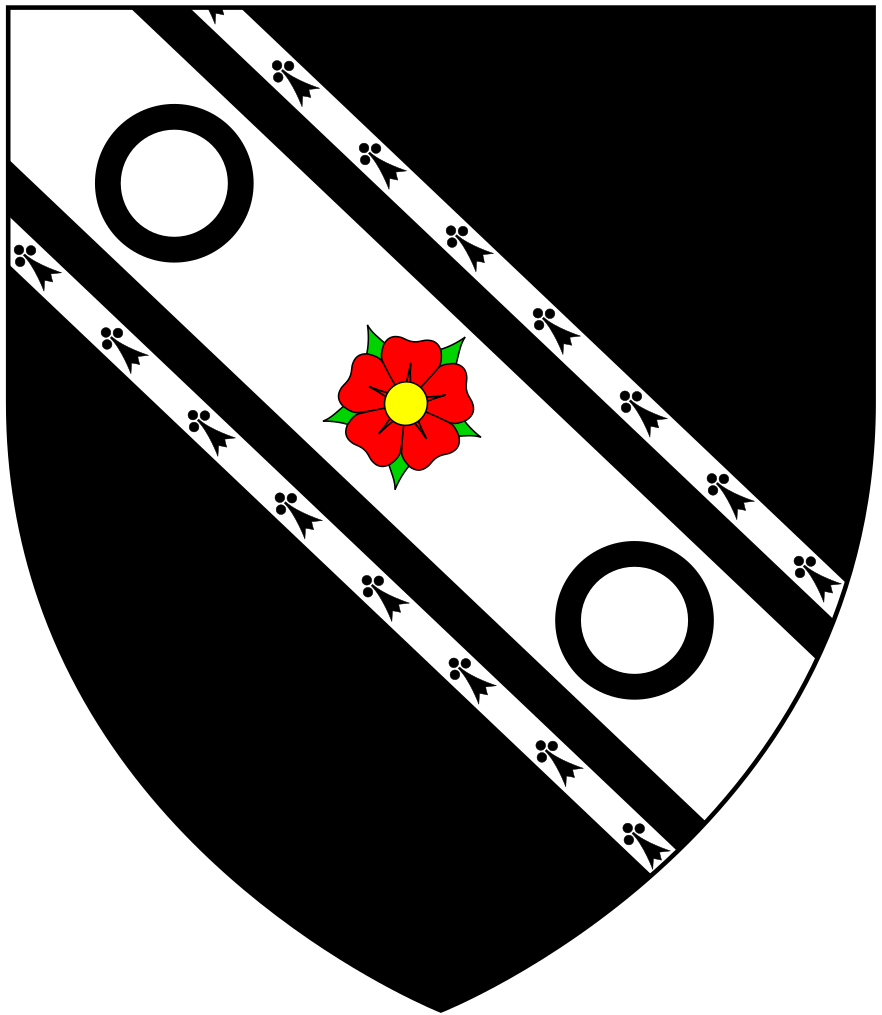
Arms of Conwy: Sable, on a bend argent cotised ermine a rose gules barbed and seeded proper between two annulets of the first

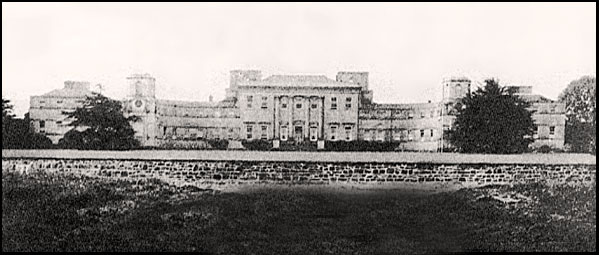
Summerhill House, Main Front

Baron Langford, of Summerhill in the County of Meath, is a title in the Peerage of Ireland. It was created on 1 July 1800 for Clotworthy Rowley, who had earlier represented Trim and County Meath in the Irish House of Commons. Born Clotworthy Taylor, he was the fourth son of Thomas Taylor, 1st Earl of Bective (whose eldest son was created Marquess of Headfort in 1800) and Jane Rowley, daughter of Hercules Langford Rowley and his wife Elizabeth Rowley, 1st Viscountess Langford (created 1766). The viscountcy of Langford became extinct in 1796 on the death of Hercules Rowley, 2nd Viscount Langford. Clotworthy Taylor succeeded to the Rowley estates and assumed by Royal licence the surname of Rowley in lieu of Taylor. Four years later the Langford title was revived when he was raised to the Peerage of Ireland as Baron Langford.

Lord Langford's great-grandson, the fourth Baron, sat in the House of Lords as an Irish representative peer from 1884 to 1919. He was succeeded by his son, the fifth Baron. On his early death in 1922 the title passed to his uncle, the sixth Baron. He was succeeded by his nephew, the seventh Baron. When he died in 1952 the line of the third Baron failed, and the title was inherited by the late Baron's first cousin once removed, the eighth Baron. He was the son of Colonel the Hon. Hercules Langford Boyle Rowley, second son of the second Baron. On his death in 1953 this line of the family also failed. The title passed to his second cousin once removed, the ninth Baron. He was the great-grandson of Hon. Richard Thomas Rowley, second son of the first Baron, who lived to the age of 105. As of 2017 the title is held by the third (but elder legitimate) son of the ninth baron, who succeeded his father in that year.

The family seat is Bodrhyddan Hall, near Rhuddlan, Denbighshire. The original family seat was Summerhill House, near Summerhill, County Meath, in Ireland.

== Barons Langford (1800) ==
- Clotworthy Rowley, 1st Baron Langford (1763–1825)
- Hercules Langford Rowley, 2nd Baron Langford (1795–1839)
- Wellington William Robert Rowley, 3rd Baron Langford (1824–1854)
- Hercules Edward Rowley, 4th Baron Langford (1848–1919)
- John Hercules William Rowley, 5th Baron Langford (1894–1922)
- William Chambre Rowley, 6th Baron Langford (1849–1931)
- Clotworthy Wellington Thomas Edward Rowley, 7th Baron Langford (1885–1952)
- Arthur Sholto Langford Rowley, 8th Baron Langford (1870–1953)
- Geoffrey Alexander Rowley-Conwy, 9th Baron Langford (1912–2017)
- Owain Grenville Rowley-Conwy, 10th Baron Langford (b. 1958)

The heir apparent is the present holder's son the Hon. Thomas Alexander Rowley-Conwy (b. 1987)

== Family tree ==
Taylour and Rowley family tree including the Marquesses of Headfort and subsidiary titles

Thomas Taylour
Baronet of Kells, 1704
Thomas Taylor; 1662–1736; 1st Baronet
Viscount Langford and Baron of Summerhill, 1766
Thomas Taylor; 1686–1757; 2nd Baronet	James Taylor; 1700–1747	Elizabeth Rowley; 1713–1791; 1st Viscountess Langford, etc. m. Hercules Langford Rowley c. 1714–1794
Baron Headfort, 1760; Viscount Headfort, 1762; Earl of Bective, 1766
Thomas Taylour; 1724–1795; 1st Earl of Bective, etc., 3rd Baronet	Jane Rowley	Hercules Rowley; 1737–1796; 2nd Viscount Langford, etc.
Viscountcy Langford and Barony of Summerhill extinct, 1796
Marquess of Headfort, 1800	Baron Langford, 1800
Thomas Taylour; 1724–1795; 1st Marquess of Headfort, 2nd Earl of Bective, etc., 4th Baronet	Hercules Taylour; 1759–1790	Clotworthy (né Taylor) Rowley; 1763–1825; 1st Baron Langford
Baron Kenlis, 1831
Thomas Taylour; 1787–1870; 2nd Marquess of Headfort, 3rd Earl of Bective, etc., 1st Baron Kenlis, 5th Baronet	Hercules Langford Rowley; 1795–1839; 2nd Baron Langford	Richard Thomas Rowley; 1812–1887
Thomas Taylour; 1822–1894; 3rd Marquess of Headfort, 4th Earl of Bective, etc., 2nd Baron Kenlis, 6th Baronet	Clotworthy Wellington William Robert Rowley; 1824–1854; 3rd Baron Langford	Hercules Langford Boyle Rowley; 1828–1904
Thomas Taylour; 1844–1893 styled Earl of Bective	Hercules Edward Rowley; 1848–1919; 4th Baron Langford	William Chambre Rowley; 1849–1931; 6th Baron Langford	Randolfe Thomas Rowley; 1852–1910	Conwy Grenville Hercules Rowley-Conwy; 1841–1900
Beatrix Taylour; 1877–1944	Geoffrey Thomas Taylour; 1878–1943; 4th Marquess of Headfort, 5th Earl of Bective, etc., 3rd Baron Kenlis, 7th Baronet	John Hercules William Rowley; 1894–1922; 5th Baron Langford	Clotworthy Wellington Thomas Edward Rowley; 1885–1952; 7th Baron Langford	Arthur Sholto Langford Rowley; 1870–1953; 8th Baron Langford	Geoffrey Seymour Rowley-Conwy; 1877–1915
Terence Geoffrey Thomas Taylour; 1902–1960; 5th Marquess of Headfort, 6th Earl of Bective, etc., 4th Baron Kenlis, 8th Baronet	William Desmond Taylour; 1904–1989	Geoffrey Alexander Rowley-Conwy; 1912–2017; 9th Baron Langford
Thomas Geoffrey Charles Michael Taylour; 1932–2005; 6th Marquess of Headfort, 7th Earl of Bective, etc., 5th Baron Kenlis, 9th Baronet
Thomas Michael Ronald Christopher Taylour b. 1959; 7th Marquess of Headfort, 8th Earl of Bective, etc., 6th Baron Kenlis, 10th Baronet	Peter Alexander Rowley-Conwy b. 1951	Owain Grenville Rowley-Conwy, 10th Baron Langford b. 1958; 10th Baron Langford
Thomas Rupert Charles Christopher Taylour b. 1989 styled Earl of Bective	Thomas Rowley-Conwy b. 1987
Hear apparent to the Headfort marquessate	Heir apparent to the Langford barony

== See also ==
- Marquess of Headfort
- Viscount Langford
- Langford baronets

== Sources ==
- Hesilrige, Arthur G. M. (1921). Debrett's Peerage and Titles of courtesy. 160A, Fleet street, London, UK: Dean & Son. p. 538.
- Kidd, Charles, Williamson, David (editors). Debrett's Peerage and Baronetage (1990 edition). New York: St Martin's Press, 1990,
- Leigh Rayment's Peerage Pages
