= Marquess of Headfort =

Noble title in the Peerage of Ireland

Marquessate of Headfort
- Quarterly: 1st & 4th, Ermine, on a chief gules, a fleur-de-lys between two boar's heads couped and erect or (Taylour); 2nd, Vert, a pegasus courant wings endorsed ermine, on a chief or, a crescent for difference (Quin); 3rd, Argent, two bendlets gules, on a chief azure, a lion passant argent
- Creation date: 29 December 1800
- Created by: George III
- First holder: Thomas Taylour, 1st Marquess of Headfort
- Present holder: Chris Taylour, 7th Marquess of Headfort
- Heir apparent: Thomas Taylour, Earl of Bective
- Subsidiary titles: Earl of Bective; Viscount Headfort; Baron Headfort; Baron Kenlis
- Status: Extant
- Former seat: Headfort House
- Motto: Consequitur quodcunque petit ("He obtains whatever he seeks")

Marquess of Headfort is a title in the Peerage of Ireland. It was created in 1800 for Thomas Taylour, 2nd Earl of Bective. (Note: Despite the official title, the family unfailingly use the alternative rendering Marquis of Headfort, and this is the spelling more commonly encountered in references to family members.)

The Marquess holds the subsidiary titles of Earl of Bective (1766), Viscount Headfort (1762), Baron Headfort, of Headfort in the County of Meath (1760), and Baron Kenlis, of Kenlis in the County of Meath (1831), all but the last in the Peerage of Ireland. He is also an Irish baronet. Before the passage of the House of Lords Act 1999, the Marquess sat in the House of Lords as Baron Kenlis in the Peerage of the United Kingdom.

The family descends from Thomas Taylor, who came to Ireland during the 1650s from Sussex in England to oversee on behalf of Parliament the fiscal expenditure of Oliver Cromwell's campaign in Ireland and later undertook the duties of a cartographer assisting with Sir William Petty's project of mapping Ireland, known as the Down Survey.

Taylor's son also Thomas Taylor represented Kells in the Irish House of Commons and in 1704, he was created a Baronet, of Kells, County Meath, in the Baronetage of Ireland. His grandson, the third Baronet, also sat for Kells in the Irish House of Commons. In 1760 he was raised to the Peerage of Ireland as Baron Headfort, of Headfort in the County of Meath. Two years later he was created Viscount Headfort, of Headfort, in the County of Meath and in 1766 he was even further honoured when he was made Earl of Bective, of Bective Castle, in the County of Meath. He was succeeded by his eldest son, the second Earl. He was one of the 28 original Irish representative peers in the House of Lords. In 1800 he was created Marquess of Headfort in the Peerage of Ireland. His son, the second Marquess, assumed the surname of Taylour in lieu of Taylor. In 1831 he was created Baron Kenlis, of Kenlis in the County of Meath, in the Peerage of the United Kingdom. This gave the Marquesses an automatic seat in the House of Lords. Lord Headfort served as a Government Whip in the Whig administration of Lord Melbourne and was also Lord Lieutenant of Cavan. His son, the third Marquess, represented Westmorland in Parliament as a Conservative and also served as Lord Lieutenant of County Meath. His son from his first marriage, Thomas Taylour, Earl of Bective, also sat as a Conservative Member of Parliament. However, he predeceased his father and on Lord Headfort's death the titles passed to his son from his second marriage, the fourth Marquess. He was a Senator of the Irish Free State. As of 2017, the titles are held by his great-grandson, the seventh Marquess, who succeeded his father in 2005.

As of 12 June 2023 the present holder of the Marquessate has not successfully proven his succession to the baronetcy and is therefore not on the Official Roll of the Baronetage, with the baronetcy considered dormant since 2005.

Another member of the Taylor family was Clotworthy Rowley, fourth son of the first Earl of Bective and younger brother of the first Marquis. He assumed the surname of Rowley in lieu of Taylor and was created Baron Langford of Summerhill in the Peerage of Ireland in 1800. Also, the Honourable the Reverend Henry Edward Taylor, fifth son of the first Earl of Bective, was the father of the Conservative politician Thomas Edward Taylor, who served as Chancellor of the Duchy of Lancaster in 1868 and from 1874 to 1880.

The family seat was Headfort House, near Kells, County Meath in Ireland.

== Taylor baronets, of Kells (1704) ==
- Sir Thomas Taylor, 1st Baronet (1662–1736)
- Sir Thomas Taylor, 2nd Baronet (1686–1757)
- Sir Thomas Taylor, 3rd Baronet (1724–1795) (created Baron Headfort in 1760, Viscount Headfort in 1762 and Earl of Bective in 1766)

== Earls of Bective (1766) ==
Also Viscount Headfort and Baron Headfort

- Thomas Taylour, 1st Earl of Bective, 1st Viscount Headfort, 1st Baron Headfort (1724–1795)
- Thomas Taylour, 2nd Earl of Bective, 2nd Viscount Headfort, 2nd Baron Headfort (1757–1829) (created Marquess of Headfort in 1800)

== Marquesses of Headfort (1800), Baron Kenlis (1831) ==
Also Earl of Bective, Viscount Headfort and Baron Headfort

- Thomas Taylour, 1st Marquess of Headfort, 2nd Earl of Bective, 2nd Viscount Headfort, 2nd Baron Headfort (1757–1829)
- Thomas Taylour, 2nd Marquess of Headfort, 3rd Earl of Bective, 3rd Viscount Headfort, 3rd Baron Headfort, 1st Baron Kenlis (1787–1870)
- Thomas Taylour, 3rd Marquess of Headfort, 4th Earl of Bective, 4th Viscount Headfort, 4th Baron Headfort, 2nd Baron Kenlis (1822–1894)
- Geoffrey Thomas Taylour, 4th Marquess of Headfort, 5th Earl of Bective, 5th Viscount Headfort, 5th Baron Headfort, 3rd Baron Kenlis (1878–1943)
- Terence Geoffrey Thomas Taylour, 5th Marquess of Headfort, 6th Earl of Bective, 6th Viscount Headfort, 6th Baron Headfort, 4th Baron Kenlis (1902–1960)
- Thomas Geoffrey Charles Michael Taylour, 6th Marquess of Headfort, 7th Earl of Bective, 7th Viscount Headfort, 7th Baron Headfort, 5th Baron Kenlis (1932–2005)
- Thomas Michael Ronald Christopher Taylour, 7th Marquess of Headfort, 8th Earl of Bective, 8th Viscount Headfort, 8th Baron Headfort, 6th Baron Kenlis (born 1959)

== Present peer ==
Thomas Michael Ronald Christopher Taylour, 7th Marquess of Headfort (b. 10 February 1959) is the only son of the 6th Marquess and his wife Elizabeth Angela Veronica Rose Nall-Cain, a daughter of Arthur Nall-Cain, 2nd Baron Brocket. Known until 2005 as Christopher Bective, he was educated at Harrow School and the Royal Agricultural College, Cirencester, he became a partner in Bective & Davidson, estate agents. In 2003 he was living on the Isle of Man and at 8 Milner Street, London.

On 21 October 2005, he succeeded his father as Marquess of Headfort (I., 1800), Earl of Bective (I., 1766), Viscount Headfort (I., 1762), Baron Headfort (I., 1760), and Baron Kenlis (U.K., 1831).

On 17 October 1987, as Christopher Bective, he married Susan Jane Vandervell, daughter of Charles Anthony Vandervell, and they have four children:

- Thomas Rupert Charles Christopher Taylour, Earl of Bective (b. 1989), heir apparent
- Lord Henry James Anthony Christopher Taylour (b. 1991)
- Lady Natasha Jane Rosanagh Taylour (b. 1997);
- Lady Alexandra Susan Katherine Taylour (b. 1998)

== Family tree and line of succession ==
Taylour and Rowley family tree including the Marquesses of Headfort and subsidiary titles

Thomas Taylour
Baronet of Kells, 1704
Thomas Taylor; 1662–1736; 1st Baronet
Viscount Langford and Baron of Summerhill, 1766
Elizabeth Rowley; 1713–1791; 1st Viscountess Langford, etc. m. Hercules Langford Rowley c. 1714–1794	Thomas Taylor; 1686–1757; 2nd Baronet	James Taylor; 1700–1747
Baron Headfort, 1760; Viscount Headfort, 1762; Earl of Bective, 1766
Hercules Rowley; 1737–1796; 2nd Viscount Langford, etc.	Jane Rowley	Thomas Taylour; 1724–1795; 1st Earl of Bective, etc., 3rd Baronet
Viscountcy Langford and Barony of Summerhill extinct, 1796
Marquess of Headfort, 1800	Baron Langford, 1800
Thomas Taylour; 1757–1829; 1st Marquess of Headfort, 2nd Earl of Bective, etc., 4th Baronet	Hercules Taylour; 1759–1790	Robert Taylour; 1760–1839	Clotworthy (né Taylo(u)r) Rowley; 1763–1825; 1st Baron Langford
Baron Kenlis, 1831
Thomas Taylour; 1787–1870; 2nd Marquess of Headfort, 3rd Earl of Bective, etc., 1st Baron Kenlis, 5th Baronet	Hercules Langford Rowley; 1795–1839; 2nd Baron Langford	Richard Thomas Rowley; 1812–1887
Thomas Taylour; 1822–1894; 3rd Marquess of Headfort, 4th Earl of Bective, etc., 2nd Baron Kenlis, 6th Baronet	Clotworthy Wellington William Robert Rowley; 1824–1854; 3rd Baron Langford	Hercules Langford Boyle Rowley; 1828–1904
Thomas Taylour; 1844–1893 styled Earl of Bective	Hercules Edward Rowley; 1848–1919; 4th Baron Langford	William Chambre Rowley; 1849–1931; 6th Baron Langford	Randolfe Thomas Rowley; 1852–1910	Conwy Grenville Hercules Rowley-Conwy; 1841–1900
Beatrix Taylour; 1877–1944 m. George Stanley; 1872–1938	Geoffrey Thomas Taylour; 1878–1943; 4th Marquess of Headfort, 5th Earl of Bective, etc., 3rd Baron Kenlis, 7th Baronet m. Rosie Boote; 1878–1958	John Hercules William Rowley; 1894–1922; 5th Baron Langford	Clotworthy Wellington Thomas Edward Rowley; 1885–1952; 7th Baron Langford	Arthur Sholto Langford Rowley; 1870–1953; 8th Baron Langford	Geoffrey Seymour Rowley-Conwy; 1877–1915
Terence Geoffrey Thomas Taylour; 1902–1960; 5th Marquess of Headfort, 6th Earl of Bective, etc., 4th Baron Kenlis, 8th Baronet	William Desmond Taylour; 1904–1989	Geoffrey Alexander Rowley-Conwy; 1912–2017; 9th Baron Langford
Thomas Geoffrey Charles Michael Taylour; 1932–2005; 6th Marquess of Headfort, 7th Earl of Bective, etc., 5th Baron Kenlis, 9th Baronet
Baronetage of Kells dormant, 2005
Thomas Michael Ronald Christopher Taylour b. 1959; 7th Marquess of Headfort, 8th Earl of Bective, etc., 6th Baron Kenlis	Peter Alexander Rowley-Conwy b. 1951	Owain Grenville Rowley-Conwy, 10th Baron Langford b. 1958; 10th Baron Langford
Thomas Rupert Charles Christopher Taylour b. 1989 styled Earl of Bective	Thomas Rowley-Conwy b. 1987
Hear apparent to the Headfort marquessate	Heir apparent to the Langford barony

Line of succession
- Thomas Taylour, 7th Marquess of Headfort (born 1959)
  - (1). Thomas Rupert Charles Christopher Taylour, Earl of Bective (born 1989)
    - (2). Rafferty Taylour, Lord Kenlis (born 2026)
  - (3). Lord Henry James Anthony Christopher Taylour (born 1991)

There are further male heirs in line to the earldom of Bective and its subsidiary titles (excepting the barony of Kenlis), who are descended from the younger sons of the 1st earl.

== Ancestry ==
Ancestors of Marquess of Headfort

8. Geoffrey Taylour, 4th Marquess of Headfort
4. Terence Taylour, 5th Marquess of Headfort
9. Rose Boote
2. Thomas Taylour, 6th Marquess of Headfort
10. James Tucker
5. Elise Tucker
1. Thomas Taylour, 7th Marquess of Headfort
12. Charles Nall-Cain, 1st Baron Brocket
6. Ronald Nall-Cain, 2nd Baron Brocket
13. Florence Nall
3. Hon. Elizabeth Nall-Cain
14. William Pennyman
7. Angela Pennyman
15. Beatrix Walker

== See also ==
- Baron Langford
