= Taylour =

Surname

Taylour is a surname. Notable people with the surname include:

- Fay Taylour (1904–1983), known as Flying Fay, Irish motorcyclist and champion speedway rider
- Hercules Taylour (1759–1790), Irish soldier and politician
- Jane Taylour (1827–1905), Scottish suffragist and women's movement campaigner
- Robert Taylour, Anglican priest in Ireland in the first half of the eighteenth century
- William Taylour Thomson KCMG CB (1813–1883), British military officer and diplomat
- Taylour Paige (born 1990), American actress and dancer
- Taylour Baronets in the Peerage of Ireland
- Christopher Taylour, 7th Marquess of Headfort (born 1959), Irish peer and estate agent
- Geoffrey Taylour, 4th Marquess of Headfort DL, JP, FZS (1878–1943), British politician and Army officer
- Michael Taylour, 6th Marquess of Headfort (1932–2005), Irish peer, aircraft salesman, politician
- Thomas Taylour, 1st Earl of Bective, KP, PC (Ire) (1724–1795), Irish peer and politician
- Thomas Taylour, Earl of Bective (1844–1893), Anglo-Irish Conservative politician
- Thomas Taylour, 1st Marquess of Headfort KP (1757–1829), Irish peer and politician
- Thomas Taylour, 2nd Marquess of Headfort KP PC (1787–1870), Anglo-Irish Whig politician
- Thomas Taylour, 3rd Marquess of Headfort KP PC (I) (1822–1894), Irish peer

== See also ==
- Tailor
- Tayler
- Taylor (disambiguation)
- Tayloria (disambiguation)
