= Richard Taylor (British Army officer) =

British Army general (1819–1904)

General Sir Richard Taylor GCB
- Born: 19 March 1819; Dublin, Ireland
- Died: 6 December 1904 (aged 85)
- Military career
- Allegiance: United Kingdom
- Branch: British Army
- Rank: General
- Commands: Queen's Own Cameron Highlanders; Fort George, Scotland; Royal Military College, Sandhurst
- Conflicts: Second Anglo-Burmese War; Crimean War (Alma, Balaclava and Sebastopol); Indian Mutiny (Lucknow)
- Awards: CB, 1857; KCB, 1882; GCB, 1902.

General Sir Richard Chambré Hayes Taylor GCB (19 March 1819 – 6 December 1904) was a senior British Army officer who served in the Second Anglo-Burmese War, the Crimean War and the Indian Mutiny. Joining the General Staff in 1860, he was the British Army's Inspector General of Recruiting, then Deputy Adjutant-General to the Forces, briefly Adjutant-General, and finally for three years Governor of the Royal Military College, Sandhurst. He was also Colonel of the Queen's Own Cameron Highlanders and the East Surrey Regiment.

Some members of the family preferred the spelling Taylour.

== Early life ==
Born in Dublin in 1819, Taylor was a younger son of the Hon. and Rev. Henry Edward Taylor (1768–1852) by his marriage in 1807 to Marianne, a daughter of Colonel Richard St Leger, second son of St Leger, 1st Viscount Doneraile (died 1787). Taylor's father was the fifth son of Thomas Taylor, 1st Earl of Bective, and was a younger brother of the first Marquess of Headfort, and he also had two other brothers, General Robert Taylour and Clotworthy Rowley, 1st Baron Langford (1763–1825), and a sister, Henrietta.

Taylor was himself one of three sons and four daughters. His older brother, Thomas Edward, born in 1811, joined the 6th Dragoon Guards, while his younger brother, Hercules Langford Barry, born in 1824, died in 1833. Their sisters were Marianne Jane (born 1809), Elizabeth Augusta Anne (1812), Louisa Catherine (1815) and Henrietta Frances (1817). Taylor was educated at Hazelwood School and the Royal Military College, Sandhurst.

== Military career ==
Taylor was commissioned as an ensign into the British Army's 79th Foot on 11 December 1835. On 29 March 1839 he was promoted Lieutenant and on 23 August 1844 Captain. During his early career he served both at home and overseas. In 1852 and 1853 he fought with the 18th Royal Irish in the Second Anglo-Burmese War. During the Crimean War he was part of the force on active service in the Crimea, from 1854 to 1855. On 12 December 1854 he was promoted lieutenant colonel, confirmed on 9 March 1855, and commanded the 79th Cameron Highlanders as part of the Highland Brigade. He fought with his regiment at the Battles of Alma and Balaclava and at the Siege of Sebastopol, at which he was mentioned in despatches. At Sebastopol, he commanded the Royal Artillery of the Highland Division. From 1856 to 1857, Taylor was in command of the Fort George Depot Battalion near Inverness. He next served with the 79th in India, from 1857 to 1859, and was there during the Mutiny. In command of the 79th, he took part in the Capture of Lucknow in March 1858. He commanded a brigade in Oude from November 1858 to January 1859. In 1860 he joined the General Staff in England, then held a variety of posts, in the course of which he was promoted major general on 6 March 1868, lieutenant general on 23 August 1877, and finally general on 30 January 1880.

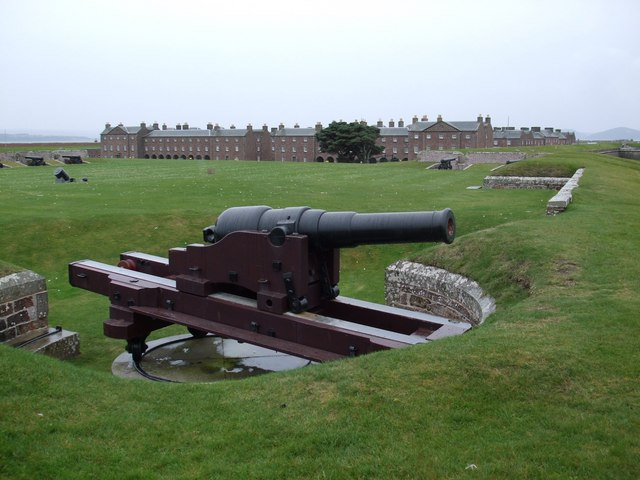
Fort George, Inverness, which Taylor commanded in 1856–57, with a Mark I rifled muzzle-loading 64-pounder gun

In 1862, Taylor was assistant adjutant general for the British Army Division at Shorncliffe and Dover. In 1873, he was appointed as the Army's Inspector General of Recruiting. He remained in this post until 1876, when he was appointed as Deputy Adjutant-General to the Forces. In 1882, Taylor took over the role of adjutant-general while Sir Garnet Wolseley was overseas in command of British forces during the Second Anglo-Egyptian War of 1882. His last posting, as governor of the Royal Military College, Sandhurst, was effective from 1 January 1883 and lasted until 1886, when he retired the service.

In 1876, Taylor was chairman of the Royal United Services Institute. From 1887 until his death, he was Colonel of the Queen's Own Cameron Highlanders, in which role he was succeeded by General Sir Ian Hamilton. He was also Colonel of the 2nd Battalion the East Surrey Regiment.

Taylor was appointed a Knight Grand Cross of the Order of the Bath (GCB) in the 1902 Coronation Honours list published on 26 June 1902, and was invested by King Edward VII at Buckingham Palace on 8 August 1902.

== Private life ==
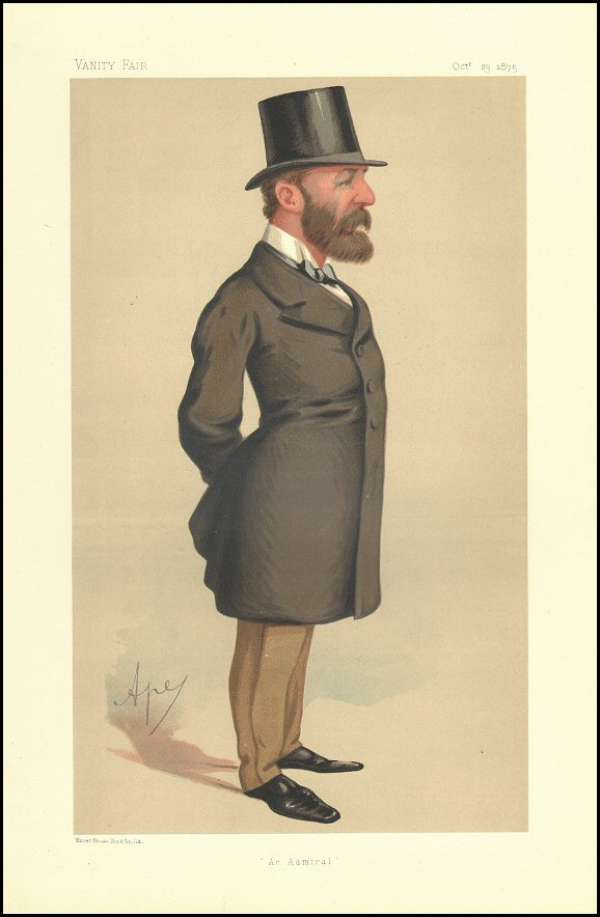
Taylor's brother-in-law Admiral Lord John Hay

Taylor's elder brother, Thomas Edward Taylor, of Ardgillan Castle, County Dublin, became member of parliament for County Dublin, Chancellor of the Duchy of Lancaster, and Commandant of the Royal Meath Militia. Taylor's father died in 1852 and his mother on 22 March 1859. The Rev. James Aberigh Mackay met Taylor in India in 1859 and later wrote of him in From London to Lucknow (1860): "Colonel Taylor of the 79th, one of the most agreeable men in the army..."

On 9 June 1863, Taylor married Lady Jane Hay, a daughter of Field Marshal the Marquess of Tweeddale. They had one son and four daughters. In 1872, they were living at number 16, Eaton Place, Westminster. Taylor also owned some 1,300 acres of land in County Meath, Ireland. Lady Jane Taylor survived her husband until 1920.

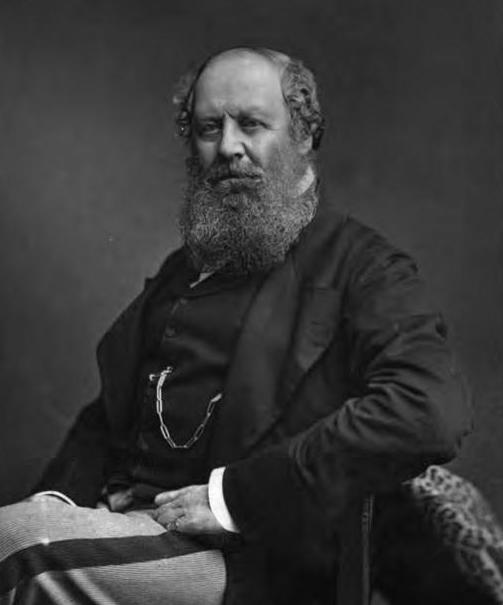
His brother, Thomas Edward Taylor, MP

Taylor's brothers-in-law included Arthur Hay, 9th Marquess of Tweeddale, Admiral of the Fleet Lord John Hay, and the Liberal member of parliament George Hay, Earl of Gifford, while his sisters-in-law were married to James Broun-Ramsay, 1st Marquess of Dalhousie, a Governor-General of India, Arthur Wellesley, 2nd Duke of Wellington, Sir Robert Peel, 3rd Baronet, and Simon Watson Taylor, of Erlestoke, Wiltshire.

Taylor's five children were:

- Constance Mary Jane (married Ronald William Murray, died 1950)
- Millicent Lilla Harriet (1867-1948)
- Evelyn Beatrice Charlotte (died 1944 unmarried)
- Florence Virginia Mathilde (died 1952 unmarried)
- Richard Edward Montagu Taylor (1872–1953).

His son Richard joined the East Surrey Regiment and fought in the Second Boer War and the First World War.

== Publications ==
- R. C. H. Taylor, The Queen's Own Cameron Highlanders: standing orders (1897)

Military offices
Preceded by Sir Garnet Wolseley	Adjutant General; 1882	Succeeded by Sir Garnet Wolseley
Preceded by Major-General William Napier	Governor of the Royal Military College Sandhurst; 1883–1886	Succeeded by General David Anderson
