= Thomas Pakenham (Royal Navy officer) =

Royal Navy officer (1757-1836)

Admiral The Honourable Sir Thomas Pakenham GCB
- Born: 29 September 1757
- Died: 2 February 1836 (aged 78)
- Military career
- Allegiance: Great Britain; United Kingdom
- Branch: Royal Navy
- Service years: 1771–1796
- Rank: Admiral
- Commands: HMS Victor; HMS San Carlos; HMS Crescent; HMS Minerva; HMS Invincible; HMS Juste
- Conflicts: American Revolutionary War; Battle of Ushant; Battle of Cape St Mary; French Revolutionary Wars; Glorious First of June

Admiral Sir Thomas Pakenham GCB (29 September 1757 – 2 February 1836) was a Royal Navy officer and politician.

== Biography ==
Pakenham was born the fourth son of Thomas Pakenham, 1st Baron Longford and his wife Elizabeth, Baroness Longford (she was later created, in June 1785, The 1st Countess of Longford).

He entered the Royal Navy in 1771 on board the Southampton, with Captain John MacBride, with whom he moved to the Orpheus in 1773. In 1774 he was on the coast of Guinea with William Cornwallis in the Pallas, and in 1775 was acting lieutenant of the Sphinx on the coast of North America.

In the following year he was promoted by Lord Shuldham to be lieutenant of the frigate Greyhound, and while in her saw much boat service, in the course of which he was severely wounded. In 1778 he joined the Courageux, commanded by Lord Mulgrave, in the fleet under Keppel, and was present in the Battle of Ushant on 27 July.

In the following spring he was moved into Europe, going to North America with the flag of Rear-Admiral Mariot Arbuthnot, and on 21 September 1779 was promoted to the command of the sloop Victor, newly captured from the enemy. He was then sent to the Jamaica station, where, on 2 March 1780, he was posted by Sir Peter Parker the elder to the San Carlos. His old wound, received while in the Greyhound, broke out again, and compelled him to return to England in the autumn.

In December 1780 he was appointed to the Crescent of 28 guns, attached to the fleet under George Darby, which relieved Gibraltar in April 1781, and was sent on to Menorca in company with the Flora under William Peere Williams-Freeman. On their way back, in passing through the straits, they fell in, on 30 May, with two Dutch frigates. In the ensuing Battle of Cape St Mary, one of the Dutch frigates, the Castor (commanded by Pieter Melvill van Carnbee), struck the Flora, while the other, the Den Briel, overpowered and captured the Crescent. The Crescent was immediately recaptured by the Flora, the Den Briel making her escape; but both Crescent and Castor had received so much damage in the action that they fell into the hands of two French frigates on the way home, 19 June, the Flora escaping. Pakenham had, however, refused to resume the command of the Crescent, maintaining that by his surrender to the Den Briel his commission was cancelled, and that when recaptured the ship was on the same footing as any other prize.

For the loss of his ship he was tried by court-martial and honourably acquitted, it is proved that he did not strike the flag till, by the fall of her masts and the disabling of her guns, further resistance was impossible. He was therefore at once appointed to the frigate Minerva, which he commanded in the following year at the relief of Gibraltar by Lord Howe.

In 1793 he commissioned the Invincible, and in her took part in the Glorious First of June, when his conduct was spoken of as particularly brilliant, and he was recommended by Howe for the gold medal. In 1795 he was turned over to the 84-gun ship Juste, in the capture of which, on 1 June, he had had a principal hand. He was afterwards for some time master-general of the ordnance in Ireland, and had no further service in the navy.

In 1783, Pakenham entered the Irish House of Commons for Longford Borough and sat until 1790. Subsequently, he represented Kells until 1798 and again Longford Borough until the Act of Union in 1801.

On 14 February 1799, Pakenham was promoted to rear-admiral, vice-admiral on 23 April 1804, and admiral on 31 July 1810. He was appointed a Knight Grand Cross of the Order of the Bath on 20 May 1820.

He married in 1785 Louisa, daughter of the Right Hon. John Staples, and had a large family.

- Edward Michael adopted the surname Conolly by Royal Licence on 27 August 1821, following the death of his great-aunt Lady Louisa Conolly.
- Thomas Pakenham (1787 - 1846), East India Company's civil service. He married Isabella-Mary, daughter of Lt.-Gen. Sir Frederick-Augustus Wetherall, K.C.Н.
- John Pakenham (1790 - 1876), married Caroline Emily, daughter of Rear-Admiral Home Riggs Popham. Their great grandson was the Rev. Thomas Arthur Charles Pakenham who was born in 1900 and married Clara Talbot Middleton in 1925. He died in 1981.
- Sir Richard Pakenham was a diplomat who served as British ambassador to Mexico, the United States and Portugal. Pakenham died on 2 February 1836.
- Reverend Robert Pakenham (1799 - 1883), married Harriet Maria, daughter of Rt. Hon. Denis Browne.

Parliament of Ireland
Preceded by John Tunnadine; David La Touche	Member of Parliament for Longford Borough; 1783–1790; With: Hon. Hercules Rowley 1783; Henry Stewart 1783–1790	Succeeded by Thomas Taylour, Viscount Headfort; Hon. Hercules Rowley
Preceded by Thomas Taylour, Viscount Headfort; Hon. Hercules Taylour	Member of Parliament for Kells; 1790 – 1798; With: Hon. Hercules Taylour 1790; Hon. Robert Taylour 1790–1798	Succeeded by Stephen Moore; Hon. Robert Taylour
Preceded by Thomas Pepper; Henry Stewart	Member of Parliament for Longford Borough; 1798 – 1801; With: Henry Stewart 1798–1799; Hon. Edward Pakenham 1799–1800; Thomas Borrowes 1800–1801	Succeeded by Parliament dissolved and replaced by the Parliament of the United Kingdom
