= Clotworthy Rowley =

Clotworthy Rowley may refer to:

- Clotworthy Rowley of Mount Campbell (c.1731–1805), Anglo-Irish barrister and MP for Downpatrick in the Irish and UK Parliaments
- Clotworthy Rowley, 1st Baron Langford (1763–1825), MP and peer in the Irish Parliament
- Clotworthy Wellington Thomas Edward Rowley, 7th Baron Langford (1885–1952), of the Barons Langford
