= Hercules Langford Rowley =

Irish politician and landowner

Hercules Langford Rowley PC

Member of Parliament for County Meath
- In office 1761–1794 Serving with Gorges Lowther, Hamilton Gorges
- Preceded by: James Napper-Dutton
- Succeeded by: Thomas Taylour, Viscount Headfort

Member of Parliament for County Londonderry
- In office 1743–1760 Serving with Edward Cary
- Preceded by: Hercules Rowley
- Succeeded by: Thomas Conolly

Personal details
- Born: c. 1714
- Died: 25 March 1794 (aged 79–80)
- Spouse: Elizabeth Ormsby Upton (died 1791)
- Relations: Catherine Wellesley, Duchess of Wellington (granddaughter); Thomas Pakenham, 2nd Earl of Longford (grandson); Sir Edward Pakenham (grandson); Sir Hercules Robert Pakenham (grandson); Thomas Taylour, 1st Marquess of Headfort (grandson); Clotworthy Rowley, 1st Baron Langford (grandson); Hercules Taylour (grandson)
- Children: Hercules Rowley, 2nd Viscount Langford
- Parent(s): Hercules Rowley; Frances Upton Rowley

Hercules Langford Rowley PC (c. 1714 – 25 March 1794) was an Irish politician and landowner.

== Early life ==
Rowley was born c. 1714. He was the only son of Frances (née Upton) Rowley and Hercules Rowley, a Member of Parliament for County Londonderry from 1703 until his death in 1742. His sister, Dorothy Beresford Rowley, was the wife of Richard Wingfield, 1st Viscount Powerscourt (parents of Edward and Richard, the 2nd and 3rd Viscounts Powerscourt).

His father was the only son of Sir John Rowley (who was knighted for his services at the time of the Restoration) and the former Mary Langford (eldest daughter and heiress of Sir Hercules Langford, 1st Baronet). In 1661, his great-grandfather Langford bought Lynch's Castle (located on the Sumerhill demesne in County Meath) and many other townlands from The Rt Rev. Dr. Henry Jones, the Lord Bishop of Meath. His aunt, Lettice Rowley, was the wife of Arthur Loftus, 3rd Viscount Loftus. His maternal grandfather was Arthur Upton of Castle Upton in County Antrium.

Through his aunt Anne, he was a first cousin of Sir Randal Beresford, 2nd Baronet and through his aunt Mary, he was a first cousin of Mary Clotworthy (who married the Hon. Robert Fitzgerald, a son of George FitzGerald, 16th Earl of Kildare, and was the mother of Robert FitzGerald, 19th Earl of Kildare and grandmother of Lt.-Gen. James FitzGerald, 1st Duke of Leinster).

== Career ==
He held the office of High Sheriff of County Meath in 1738. He held the office of Member of Parliament for County Londonderry between 1743 and 1760. From 1761 to 1794, he was a Member of Parliament for County Meath. He was appointed a member of the Irish Privy Council.

On 19 February 1766, his wife was created Viscountess Langford of Langford Lodge in the Peerage of Ireland. She was made Baroness Summerhill at the same time, also in the Peerage of Ireland. She was succeeded by her son, the second Viscount.

Rowley inherited his father's estates, including Lynch's Castle, which had been occupied by the Langfords since 1661. In 1731, Rowley hired architects Sir Edward Lovett Pearce and Richard Cassels to build him a new Georgian mansion on the property, known as Summerhill House. Lynch's Castle was abandoned in the 1730s but remained on the land as a folly. Summerhill House was damaged by fire on a number of occasions before it was set on fire by the Irish Republican Army and completely destroyed in early 1921, remaining a ruin until it was totally demolished in 1970.

In 1743, upon entering parliament, Rowley purchased a large house on then fashionable Mary Street in the North of Dublin city. The house was later to become known as Langford House and was an imposing 5-bay, four-storey over basement structure.

== Personal life ==
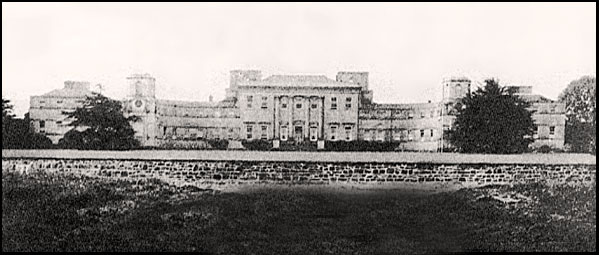
The Rowley residence, Summerhill House, built 1731.

On 31 October 1732, he was married to Elizabeth Ormsby Upton (1713–1791), the only daughter of Clotworthy Upton (MP for the borough of Newton and County Antrim) and Jane Ormsby (daughter of John Ormsby MP for Kilmallock). Together, they lived at Summerhill, County Meath, and were the parents of:

- Hon. Jane Rowley (c. 1734–1818), who married Thomas Taylour (1724–1795), eldest son of Sir Thomas Taylor, 2nd Baronet, in 1754. Successively, she became the Baroness Headford in 1760, Viscountess Headfort in 1762, and Countess of Bective in 1766 as her husband was increasingly elevated in the peerage of Ireland.
- Hercules Rowley, 2nd Viscount Langford (1737–1796) a member of the Irish House of Commons for County Antrim and Downpatrick. He died unmarried in March 1796.
- Maj. Hon. Clotworthy Rowley (1740–1781), who married Elizabeth Crosbie, daughter of William Francis Crosbie, MP for Trim and Hon. Frances Wesley (a daughter of Richard Wesley, 1st Baron Mornington), in 1775.
- Hon. Catherine Rowley (1748–1816), who married Edward Pakenham, 2nd Baron Longford, son of Thomas Pakenham, 1st Baron Longford and Elizabeth Cuffe, 1st Countess of Longford. They resided at Pakenham Hall Castle in County Westmeath.
- Arthur Rowley, who died unmarried.

His wife died in 1791 and was succeeded in her titles by their eldest son, Hercules. Rowley died on 25 March 1794 at Langford House in Dublin.

=== Descendants and legacy ===
The Viscountcy became extinct in 1796 on the death of their son Hercules. The Rowley estates were inherited by his grandson, Clotworthy Taylour, the fourth son of his eldest daughter, the former Jane Rowley, and her husband, Thomas Taylor, 1st Earl of Bective. Clotworthy assumed, by Royal licence, the surname of Rowley in 1796 and, in 1800, the Langford title was revived when he was raised to the Peerage of Ireland as Baron Langford. In 1794, Clotworthy married his first cousin, Frances Rowley (c. 1775–1860), the daughter of Clotworthy Rowley and his wife, Elizbaeth Crosbie.

Through his daughter Jane, he was also a grandfather of Thomas Taylour, 1st Marquess of Headfort (1757–1829), who married Mary Quin (a granddaughter of Sir Henry Cavendish, 1st Baronet); Major Hon. Hercules Taylour (1759–1790), an MP died unmarried; and Gen. Hon. Robert Taylour (1760–1839), also an MP who died unmarried; the Rev. Hon. Henry Edward Taylour (1768–1852), who married a granddaughter of the 1st Viscount Doneraile); and Lady Henrietta Taylour (d. 1838), who married Chambré Brabazon Ponsonby-Barker MP (son of Chambré Brabazon Ponsonby).

Through his daughter Catherine, he was a grandfather of Catherine Pakenham (1773–1831) (who married Arthur Wellesley, 1st Duke of Wellington), Thomas Pakenham, 2nd Earl of Longford (1774–1835), Gen. Sir Edward Pakenham (1778–1815), and Lt.-Gen. Sir Hercules Robert Pakenham (1781–1850) (aide-de-camp to William IV).

Parliament of Ireland
Preceded by James Napper-Dutton	Member of Parliament for County Meath; 1761–1794; With: Gorges Lowther (1761–1791); Hamilton Gorges (1792–1794)	Succeeded by Thomas Taylour, Viscount Headfort
Preceded by Hercules Rowley	Member of Parliament for County Londonderry; 1743–1760; With: Edward Cary	Succeeded by Thomas Conolly
