= Summerhill House =

Palladian house in County Meath, Ireland

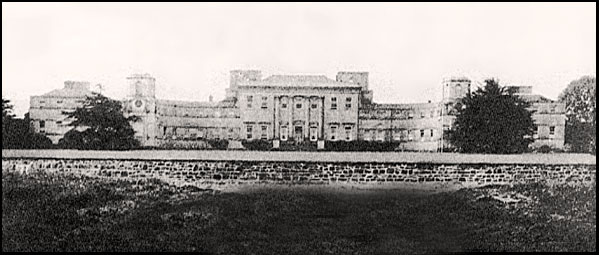

General information
- Status: Private dwelling house
- Type: House
- Architectural style: Palladian; Baroque
- Classification: Demolished
- Location: Summerhill, County Meath, Ireland
- Coordinates: 53.4801618°N 6.7325901°W
- Elevation: 50 m (160 ft)
- Estimated completion: 1731
- Demolished: Arson (4 Feb 1921); Demolition (1959); Final clearance (1970)

Height
- Height: 30 m (98 ft)

Dimensions
- Other dimensions: 300 feet in length

Technical details
- Material: limestone
- Size: 389,000 cubic feet
- Floor count: 3

Design and construction
- Architects: Designed by Edward Lovett Pearce; Completed by Richard Cassels
- Developer: Hercules Langford Rowley
- Known for: The largest house in Ireland

Other information
- Number of rooms: circa 100

Summerhill House was a 100-roomed Palladian house in County Meath, Ireland which was the ancestral seat of the Viscounts Langford and the Barons Langford. Built in 1731, it was likely designed by Sir Edward Lovett Pearce and completed by Richard Cassels in the Palladian style, although Sir John Vanbrugh, who was related to Pearce and with whom he trained, is thought to have also influenced the design of the house, which could be seen in the Baroque details, great arched chimney stacks and the palatial grandeur and scale.

The house demonstrated the power and wealth the Langford Rowley family had at the time. They owned vast amounts of land in counties Meath, Westmeath, Cork, Londonderry, Antrim, and Dublin as well as in Devon and Cornwall in England. The house also welcomed royalty, and ranked architecturally amongst the finest and most modern mansions in Europe.

The house was largely destroyed by fire in 1921 in the Irish War of Independence, and the remnants were eventually demolished some decades later. Desmond FitzGerald, 29th Knight of Glin and president of the Irish Georgian Society, described its loss as "probably the greatest tragedy in the history of Irish domestic architecture".

== History ==
=== 17th century ===
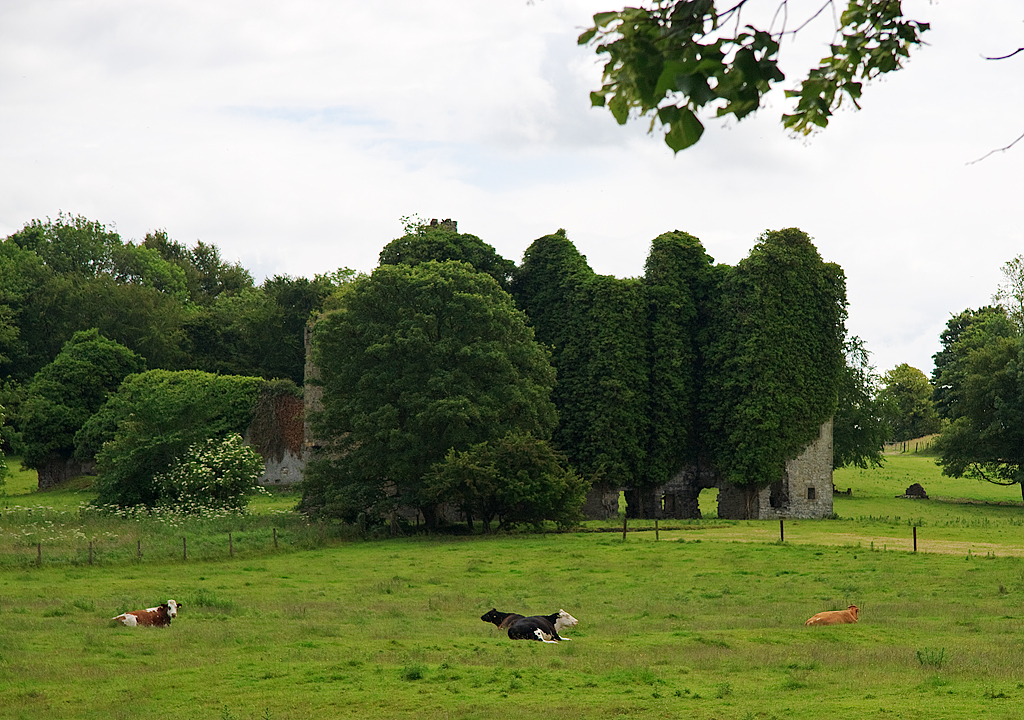
Lynch's Castle, Summerhill

In 1661, Sir Hercules Langford, 1st Baronet bought Lynch's Castle located on the Summerhill demesne in County Meath and many other townlands from The Rt Rev. Dr. Henry Jones, the Lord Bishop of Meath who had been awarded it by Oliver Cromwell. Fourteen years prior in 1647, the surrounding area had formed the battlefield for the Battle of Dungan's Hill.

Earlier, John Rowley came to Ireland during the reign of James I, as sole agent for the building of the towns of Derry and Coleraine for the London Society. Upon the incorporation of the city of Derry in 1613, he was, by charter, appointed first Mayor of Derry city. He was later knighted for his services at the time of the Restoration. He also married Mary, daughter of Sir Hercules Langford, 1st Baronet.

One of Rowley's daughters, Anne, married Sir Tristram Beresford, 1st Baronet, ancestor to the family of Tyrone. Another daughter, Mary, married James Clotworthy, and by him had an only daughter, who married Robert FitzGerald, 19th Earl of Kildare, and who was grandmother of Lieutenant-General The 1st Duke of Leinster.

He only left one son, Hercules Rowley and via his son's marriage to Frances Upton, his only son and heir, Hercules Langford Rowley, married in 1732, Elizabeth Ormsby, later created The 1st Viscountess Langford. It is likely the family still lived at Lynch's Castle until this time.

=== 18th century ===
In the 1730s Langford Rowley constructed the vast Palladian Baroque house at Summerhill.

Later in 1743, Langford also acquired what was to become Langford House on Mary Street in Dublin city as his town residence while sitting in parliament. Robert Adam was engaged in 1765 to carry out an interior redecoration and interior remodelling of this house. At the same time he was also commissioned to complete an extension to the already sprawling Summerhill house however these designs composed of a quadrant link connecting two wings, were ultimately never executed.

Summerhill House was damaged by fire during the Irish Rebellion of 1798.

=== 19th century ===
In 1845, the Parliamentary Gazeteer and other sources describe the house as being in a state of decline, with much of its extensive mature woodlands having been removed.

The house and estate had been inherited in 1854 by The 4th Baron Langford (1848–1919). He engaged the architect John McCurdy to restore parts of the house in 1869.

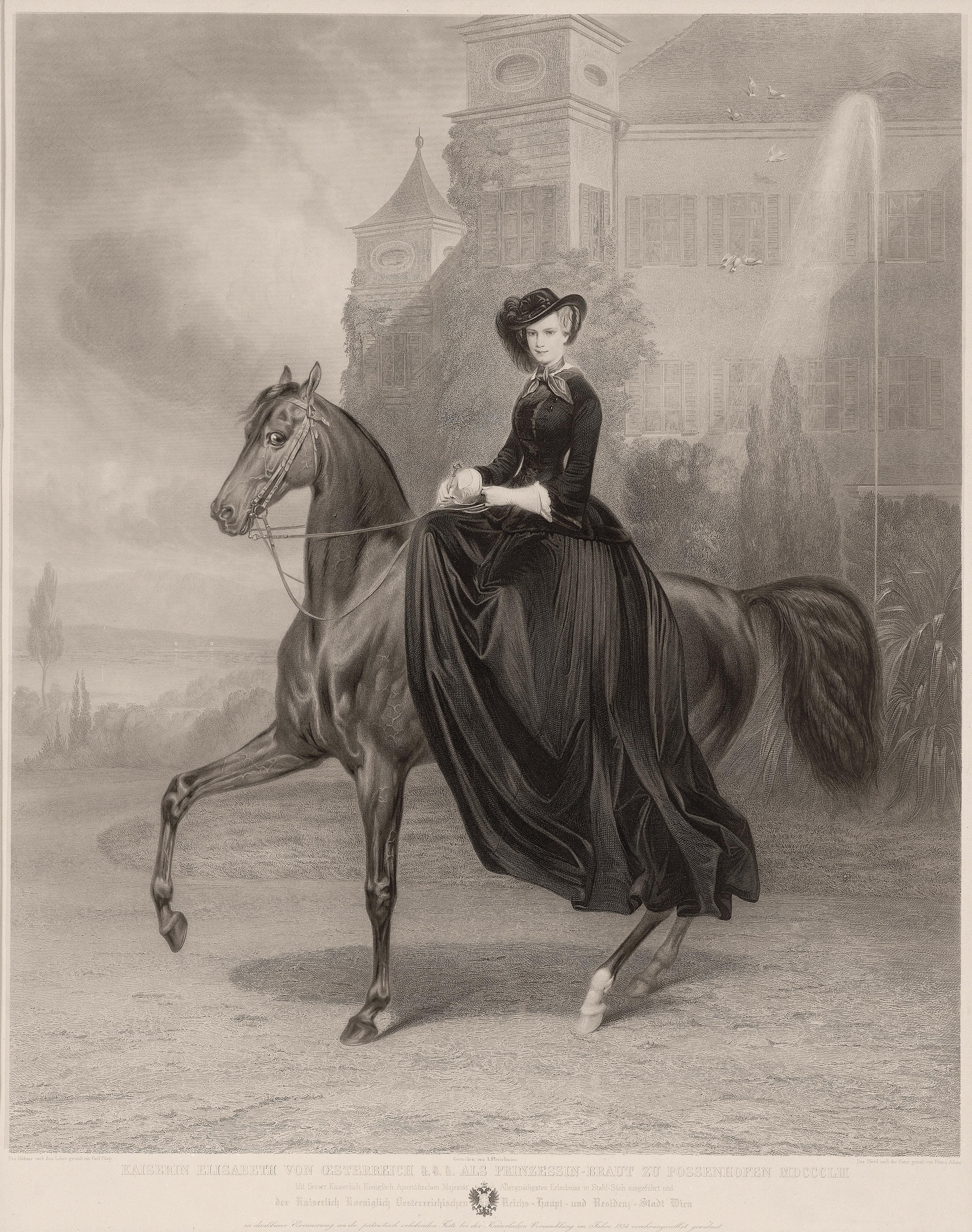
Equestrian portrait of Elisabeth at Possenhofen Castle, 1853

The Empress of Austria visited Summerhill in February 1879 for a six week holiday for the purposes of hunting. When she was on one hunt in Dunshaughlin, as they came to Maynooth they came across two men repairing a demesne wall of the Catholic seminary. As the deer they were hunting jumped into the land of the college, the empress followed without knowing where she was going and nearly jumped on the President of the college, Professor William Walsh, who later became the Archbishop of Dublin and Primate of Ireland. Throughout her trip she was accompanied by George "Bay" Middleton who was widely rumoured to be her lover.

On 13 November 2010 one famous riding whip appeared in a country house auction in Slane Castle held by Adams. This whip was owned by the Empress and was given to Robert Fowler who was the Master of the Meath Hounds at the time of her stay in Summerhill. The whip had been lost and had been found not long before the auction in Rahinston House. The whip was found in a mahogany presentation case with a silver crest plate bearing the Imperial Arms of Habsburg. The whip was estimated at €3,000-€5,000 but reached a total of €37,000.

=== 20th century ===
A the time of the 1901 census, Hercules Edward Rowley, 4th Baron Langford is recorded at the house with his wife and three children. At the time of the 1911 census, Lord Langford is listed as head of the family at the house with 9 servants but none of the family are there.

The house suffered problems when farm hands went on strike and damaged farming equipment in 1919. Republican workers and farm hands were evicted from their homes and after months of agrarian agitation eventually on 4 February 1921, the Irish Republican Army invaded and took the estate and distributed the lands and farms around the house equally amongst the workers and their families, before they set the house on fire where it was mostly destroyed.

He was succeeded by his son, the young 5th Baron (1894–1922), who died prematurely and was in turn succeeded by his elderly cousin, Colonel William Chambre Rowley, who became the 6th Baron.

In 1922, Colonel The 6th Baron Langford (1849–1931), who had only inherited the barony the previous year, sought compensation from the Government of the Irish Free State. After three years of negotiation with the Compensation Board, a sum of £43,500 was paid to Colonel Lord Langford, approximately one third of the value of the house and contents destroyed in the fire. The elderly Lord Langford invested the money in gilt-edged stocks and moved to Middlesex in England.

Even in a ruinous state, the house was still said to be one of the architectural wonders of Ireland and made the house even more romantic in some minds much like the ruined Seaton Delaval. The calcinating of the external limestone gave it a more patterned and less harsh look similar to rustication in a way that can be seen at Russborough House.

Summerhill House stood as a ruin until it was totally demolished in 1970.

== Architecture ==
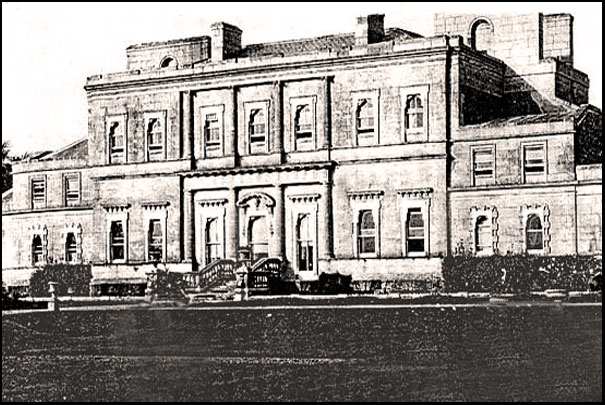
Summerhill House, Garden Front c1903 (rear of the property).

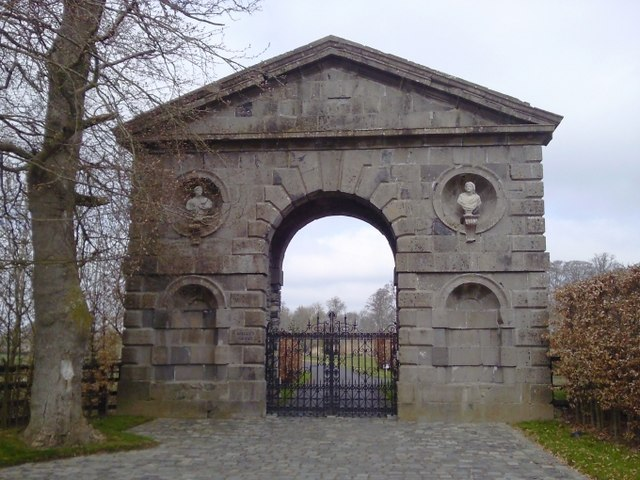
One of the surviving ornamental side gates to Summerhill House with oculi and blind niches was taken down and re-erected in recent years at Dolly's Grove. The gates stood to the side of the wings as entrances to the rear gardens extending the already vast width of the house. The busts are not original and were added in modern times.

The house stood on the summit of a hill with the main entrance from the village of Summerhill with another entrance from a mile long avenue on the Dublin road. In all, there were four avenues leading out to the four points of the compass.

It consisted of a centre block and two wings, the mansion was massively built of limestone and of great length. Four semi-columns with Corinthian capitals ornamented the front; the main order was carried up the full height of the house like Renaissance Palaces in Rome. There was a portico in front of two sunken gardens behind with a raised grassy platform for a sundial; a large rose garden as well as another very large garden. When the Langford mansion was built the path went up the hill and around the portico.

A broad flight of stairs led to the entrance of the mansion.

=== Gardens ===
The gardens to the front of the house contained a Ha-ha.

A gothic mausoleum was also constructed around 1781 not far from the house and elements still survive at a religious institution in County Meath.

=== Interiors ===
The Lafranchini brothers are said to have designed some of the interior stucco work and ceilings of the house including the state dining room which was detached from the main block.

There was a large and very lofty hall, which was similar to Leinster House in Dublin. The hall contained plaques, pastels and oil portraits by Francesco Guardi and Hugh Douglas Hamilton as well as statuary of Mary Pakenham, daughter of the first Lord Longford by the sculptor Thomas Banks. To the right on entering was the library. The drawing room had a southern aspect, and contained several portraits of the Rowley family including by famous artists such as Pompeo Batoni. Two symmetrical grand staircases led to the bedrooms.

== See also ==
- Desart Court
