= Henry Stewart (politician) =

Irish politician

Henry Stewart (10 May 1749 – September 1840) was an Irish politician.

He sat in the House of Commons of Ireland as a Member of Parliament for Longford Borough from 1783 to 1790 and from 1791 to 1799.

Parliament of Ireland
Preceded by Hon. Thomas Pakenham; Hon. Hercules Rowley	Member of Parliament for Longford Borough; 1783 – 1790; With: Hon. Thomas Pakenham	Succeeded by Thomas Taylour, Viscount Headfort; Hon. Hercules Rowley
Preceded by Thomas Taylour, Viscount Headfort; Hon. Hercules Rowley	Member of Parliament for Longford Borough; 1791 – 1799; With: Thomas Taylour, Viscount Headfort to 1794; Thomas Pepper 1794–98; Thomas Pakenham from 1798	Succeeded by Thomas Pakenham; Edward Pakenham
