= Thomas Taylour, 1st Earl of Bective =

Irish politician and peer (1724–1795)

The Right Honourable The Earl of Bective KP, PC
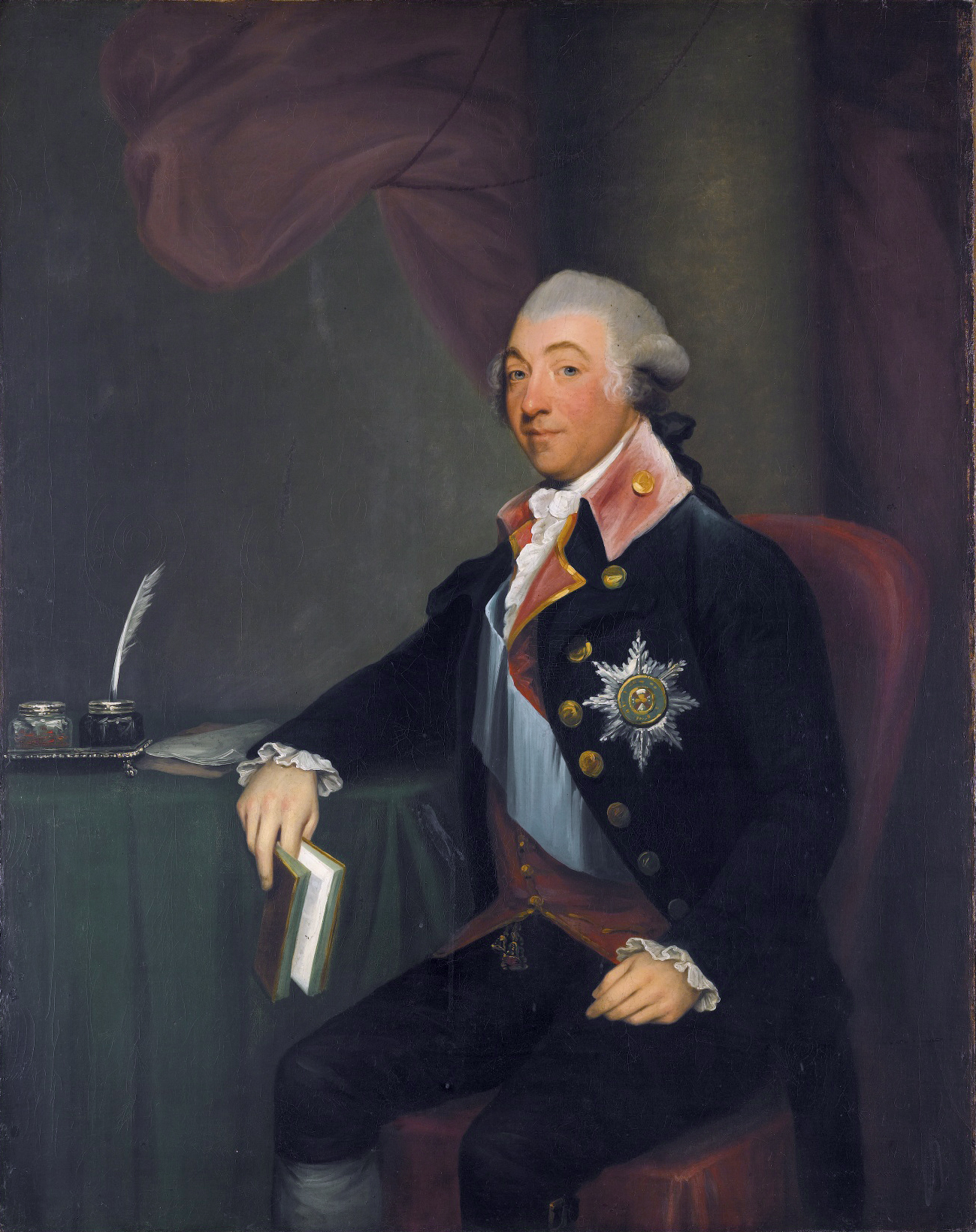
- Portrait by Gilbert Stuart

Member of Parliament for Kells
- In office 1747–1760 Serving with Sir Thomas Taylor, 2nd Bt, Richard Moore
- Preceded by: Sir Thomas Taylor, 2nd Bt; James Taylor
- Succeeded by: Richard Moore; Thomas Pepper

Personal details
- Born: Thomas Taylour; 20 October 1724
- Died: 14 February 1795 (aged 70)
- Spouse: Hon. Jane Rowley (m. 1754)
- Children: 10
- Parent(s): Sir Thomas Taylor, 2nd Baronet; Sarah Graham
- Relatives: Thomas Edward Taylor (grandson); Sir Richard Taylor (grandson Sir Thomas Taylor, 1st Baronet (grandfather)
- Education: Trinity College, Dublin

Thomas Taylour, 1st Earl of Bective, KP, PC (Ire) (20 October 1724 – 14 February 1795) was an Irish peer and politician.

== Early life ==
He was the oldest son of the former Sarah Graham and Sir Thomas Taylor, 2nd Baronet, a Member of the Parliament of England (MP) for Kells from 1713 to 1757. His sister, Henrietta Taylor, was the wife of Richard Moore.

His paternal grandparents were the former Anne Cotton (a daughter of Sir Robert Cotton, 1st Baronet, of Combermere) and Sir Thomas Taylor, 1st Baronet (a son of Thomas Taylor, who settled in Ireland from Sussex following the Cromwellian conquest of Ireland in 1652). His maternal grandfather was John Graham. In 1757, Bective succeeded his father as baronet.

He was educated at Trinity College, Dublin.

== Career ==
Bective entered the Irish House of Commons in 1747 and sat as Member of Parliament (MP) for Kells until 1760, when he was elevated to the Peerage of Ireland as Baron Headfort, of Headfort, in the County of Meath. He was further honoured in 1762, he was made Viscount Headfort, of Headfort, in the County of Meath in 1762, and on 24 October 1766, he was advanced to the dignity of Earl of Bective, of Bective Castle, in the County of Meath.

In 1783, Bective became a founding member of the Most Illustrious Order of St Patrick and in 1785 he was sworn of the Privy Council of Ireland.

== Personal life ==
On 4 July 1754, he married Hon. Jane Rowley, daughter of Rt. Hon. Hercules Langford Rowley and his wife Elizabeth Rowley, 1st Viscountess Langford. Her brother, Hercules Rowley, 2nd Viscount Langford, represented County Antrim and Downpatrick in the Irish Parliament. Together, they had four daughters and six sons, including:

- Thomas Taylour, 1st Marquess of Headfort (1757–1829), who married Mary Quin, a granddaughter of Sir Henry Cavendish, 1st Baronet.
- Major Hon. Hercules Taylour (1759–1790), who represented Kells like his father and died unmarried.
- General Hon. Robert Taylour (1760–1839), who also represented Kells and died unmarried.
- Clotworthy Rowley, 1st Baron Langford (1763–1825), who assumed the surname of Rowley, by Royal licence, in 1796, when he inherited the Rowley estates and was ennobled in his own right as Baron Langford of Summerhill in 1800. He married his first cousin, Frances Rowley, daughter of Hon. Major Clotworthy Rowley.
- Rev. Hon. Henry Edward Taylour (1768–1852), who married Marianne St Leger, daughter of Col. Hon. Richard St Leger and granddaughter of the 1st Viscount Doneraile.
- Lady Henrietta Taylour (d. 1838), who married Chambré Brabazon Ponsonby-Barker, son of Chambré Brabazon Ponsonby, in 1791.
- Lady Catherine Taylour, who died unmarried.

Lord Bective died, aged 70, on 14 February 1795 and was succeeded in his titles by his oldest son Thomas. The widowed Countess of Bective died on 25 June 1818.

=== Descendants ===
Through his daughter Lady Henrietta, he was a grandfather of four, including Catherine Jane Ponsonby-Barker (who married Edward Michael Conolly MP).

Through his son, the Rev. Henry, he was a grandfather of Thomas Edward Taylor, MP and Chancellor of the Duchy of Lancaster, and General Sir Richard Chambré Hayes Taylor (1819–1904), who enjoyed a long and distinguished career in the army.

Parliament of Ireland
Preceded by Sir Thomas Taylor, 2nd Bt; James Taylor	Member of Parliament for Kells; 1747–1760; With: Sir Thomas Taylor, 2nd Bt 1747–1757; Richard Moore 1757–1760	Succeeded by Richard Moore; Thomas Pepper
Peerage of Ireland
New creation	Earl of Bective; 1766–1795	Succeeded by Thomas Taylour
New creation	Viscount Headfort; 1762–1795	Succeeded by Thomas Taylour
New creation	Baron Headfort; 1760–1795	Succeeded by Thomas Taylour
Baronetage of Ireland
Preceded by Thomas Taylor	Baronet (of Kells); 1757–1795	Succeeded by Thomas Taylour
