= Sir Marcus Somerville, 4th Baronet =

Anglo-Irish politician

Member of Parliament for County Meath

4th Baronet
- In office 1800–1831
- Preceded by: Constituency created
- Succeeded by: William Somerville
- Constituency: County Meath

Personal details
- Born: 1772
- Died: July 11, 1831
- Party: Whig
- Spouse: Mary Anne Meredyth
- Children: William Somerville
- Parent(s): Sir James Quaile Somerville, 3rd Baronet and Catherine Crofton
- Occupation: politician

Sir Marcus Somerville, 4th Baronet (1772 – 11 July 1831) was an Anglo-Irish politician.

Somerville was the son of Sir James Quaile Somerville, 3rd Baronet and Catherine Crofton. He was the Member of Parliament for County Meath in the Irish House of Commons in 1800, before sitting for its successor constituency in the House of Commons of the United Kingdom until his death in 1831. He was a Whig.

In 1800, Somerville succeeded to his father's baronetcy. He married Mary Anne Meredyth, daughter of Richard Gorges-Meredyth, on 11 August 1801 and they had two sons, the eldest being William Somerville.

Parliament of Ireland
Preceded by Hon. Clotworthy Rowley; Hamilton Gorges	Member of Parliament for County Meath; 1800; With: Hamilton Gorges	Parliament of Ireland abolished
Parliament of the United Kingdom
New parliament	Member of Parliament for County Meath; 1800; With: Hamilton Gorges (1801–1802); Thomas Cherburgh Bligh (1802–1812); Thomas Taylour, Earl of Bective (1812–1830); Arthur Plunkett, Baron Killeen (1830–1831)	Succeeded by Arthur Plunkett, Baron Killeen; Henry Grattan
Baronetage of Ireland
Preceded by James Somerville	Baronet (of Somerville); 1800–1831	Succeeded by William Somerville
