= Sir Thomas Taylor, 2nd Baronet =

Sir Thomas Taylor, 2nd Baronet may refer to:

- Sir Thomas Taylor, 2nd Baronet, of Park House (1657–1696)
- Sir Thomas Taylor, 2nd Baronet, of Kells (1686–1757)
