= John Pomeroy (British Army officer) =

Irish-born British Army general (1724-1790)

Lieutenant-General The Right Honourable John Pomeroy MP
- Born: 1724
- Died: 10 June 1790 (aged 65–66)

John Pomeroy (1724 – 10 June 1790) was an Irish general, the younger brother of Arthur Pomeroy, 1st Viscount Harberton.

== Career ==
He was elected to the Irish House of Commons as Member of Parliament for Carrick in 1755 and for Trim in May 1761.

On 9 March 1762 he was promoted from Lieutenant-Colonel to Colonel of Foot, and later to Major-General. He served in North America, including at the Battle of Bunker Hill. He was appointed to the Privy Council of Ireland on 28 May 1777 and promoted to Lieutenant-General on 6 September 1777.

In 1783 he was re-elected for Trim alongside William Wellesley, and in May 1790 alongside Arthur Wellesley.

== Death and succession ==
On his death later that year, he was succeeded as MP for Trim by Clotworthy Taylor, and as Colonel of the 64th Regiment of Foot by Major-General John Leland.
