= Thomas Taylour, 1st Marquess of Headfort =

Irish politician

The Most Honourable The Marquess of Headfort KP
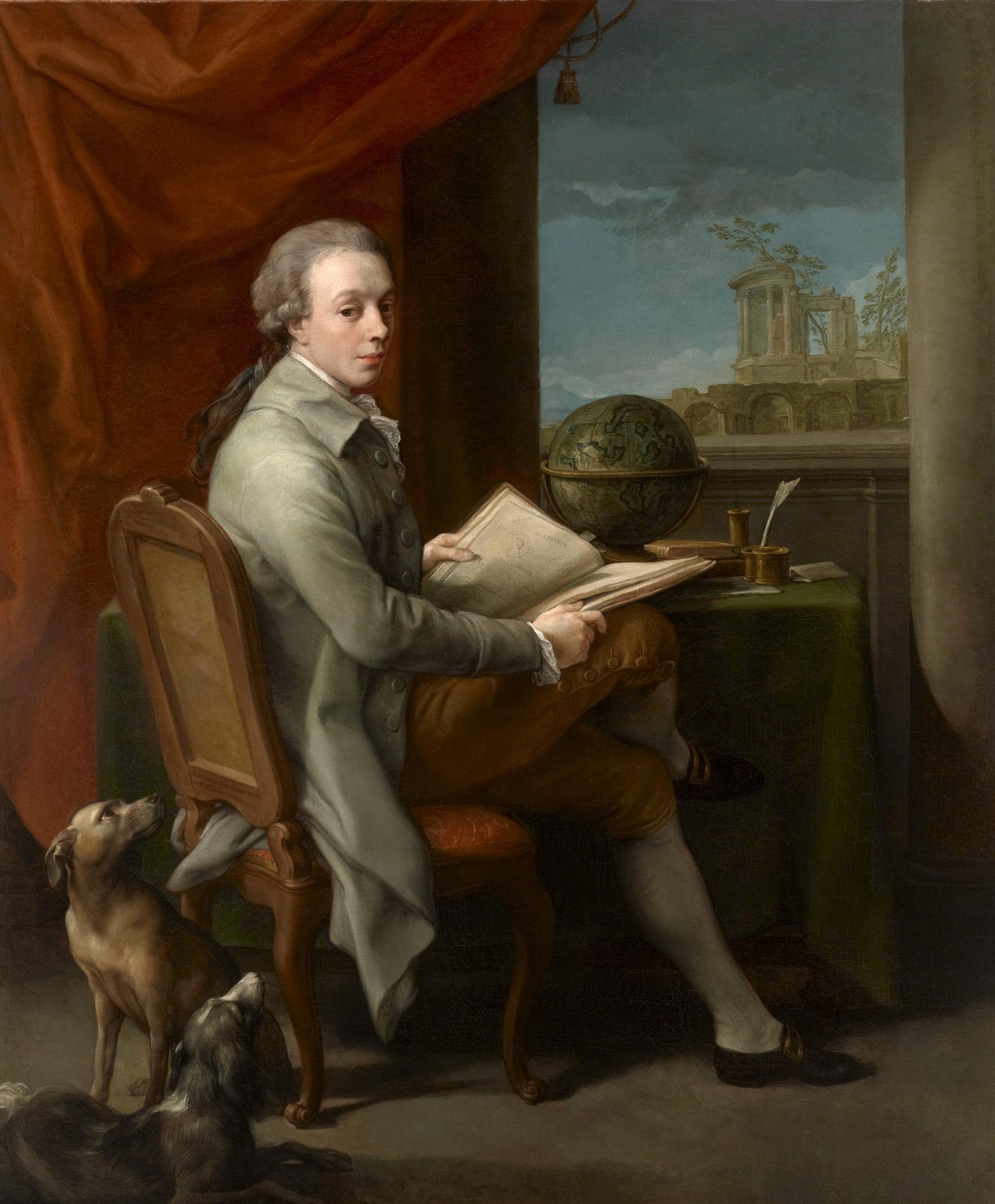
- Portrait by Pompeo Batoni, 1782

Member of Parliament for County Meath
- In office 1794–1795 Serving with Hamilton Gorges
- Preceded by: Hercules Langford Rowley; Hamilton Gorges
- Succeeded by: Hon. Clotworthy Taylor; Hamilton Gorges

Member of Parliament for Longford Borough
- In office 1790–1794 Serving with Hon. Hercules Rowley, Henry Stewart
- Preceded by: Hon. Thomas Pakenham; Henry Stewart
- Succeeded by: Thomas Pepper; Henry Stewart

Member of Parliament for Kells
- In office 1776–1790 Serving with Thomas Moore, Hon. Hercules Taylour
- Preceded by: Thomas Pepper; Thomas Moore
- Succeeded by: Hon. Hercules Taylour; Hon. Thomas Pakenham

Personal details
- Born: Thomas Taylour; 18 November 1757
- Died: 24 October 1829 (aged 71)
- Spouse: Mary Quin (m. 1778)
- Children: 4
- Parent(s): Thomas Taylour, 1st Earl of Bective; Hon. Jane Rowley
- Relatives: Clotworthy Rowley, 1st Baron Langford (brother); Hercules Rowley, 2nd Viscount Langford (uncle); Elizabeth Rowley, 1st Viscountess Langford (grandmother); Sir Thomas Taylor, 2nd Baronet (grandfather)

Thomas Taylour, 1st Marquess of Headfort KP (18 November 1757 – 24 October 1829), styled Viscount Headford from 1766 to 1795, and known as The Earl of Bective from 1795 to 1800, was an Irish peer and politician.

== Early life ==
Taylour was born on 18 November 1757. He was the eldest son of four daughters and six sons born to the former Hon. Jane Rowley and Thomas Taylour, 1st Earl of Bective, a Member of Parliament for Kells. His younger brothers, Hercules and Robert both represented both the same constituency as their father. His younger brother, Clotworthy Taylour, inherited their maternal uncle's estates and was raised to the Irish peerage.

His paternal grandparents were Sir Thomas Taylor, 2nd Baronet and the former Sarah Graham. His maternal grandparents were the Rt. Hon. Hercules Langford Rowley and Elizabeth Ormsby Upton, suo jure Viscountess Langford. His maternal uncle, Hercules Rowley, 2nd Viscount Langford represented County Antrim and Downpatrick in the Irish Parliament. After his death in 1796, the Rowley estates were inherited by his younger brother, Clotworthy (who assumed the surname of Rowley, by Royal licence, in 1796 and in 1800 the Langford title was revived when he was raised to the Peerage of Ireland as Baron Langford).

== Career ==
Like his father and several of his brothers, Taylour represented Kells in the Irish House of Commons from 1776 to 1790. Subsequently, he sat as Member of Parliament for Longford Borough until 1794 and then for County Meath until 1795, when he succeeded his father as earl. He became Marquess of Headfort in 1800 and was appointed a Knight of the Order of St Patrick on 15 May 1806.

Taylour served as Sheriff of County Meath in 1786 and as a Governor of County Meath. He was commissioned as the first Colonel of the Royal Meath Militia on 25 April 1793 and remained in command until he handed over to his son in 1823. He succeeded to his father's earldom on 14 Feb 1795 and was himself created the Marquess of Headfort in the Peerage of Ireland on 29 December 1800. From 1800 to 1829, he was an Irish representative peer. He was made a Knight of St Patrick in 1806 and served as a Lord of the Bedchamber from 1812 to 1829.

== Personal life ==
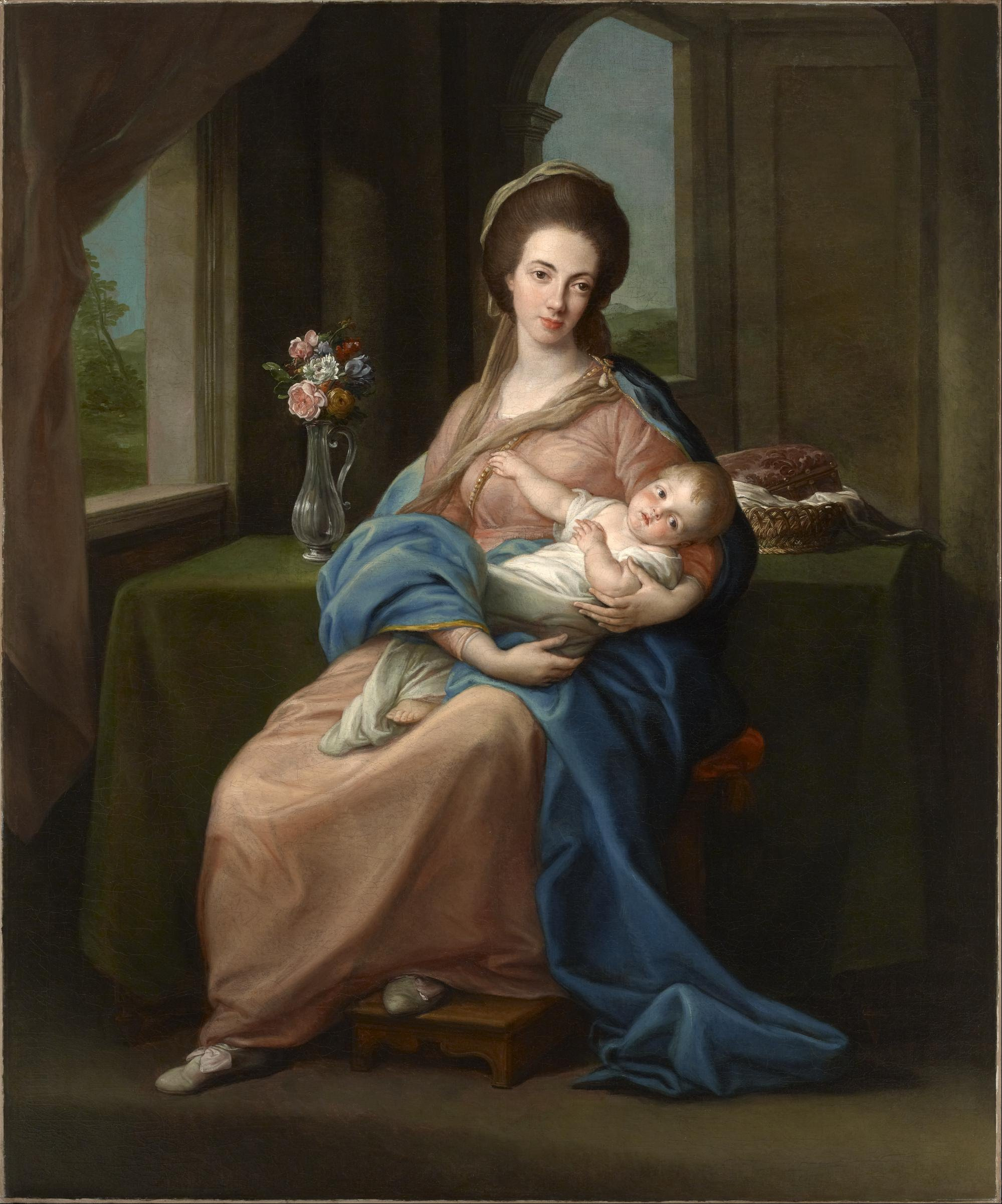
Portrait of Taylour's wife, Mary Quin, and newborn daughter Mary by Pompeo Batoni, 1782. Today at the Museum of Fine Arts, Houston.

On 5 December 1778, Taylour married Mary Quin, the daughter of George Quin and Caroline Cavendish (a daughter of Sir Henry Cavendish, Bt and sister of Sir Henry Cavendish, Bt). Her maternal grandparents were Mary (née Widenham) Quin and Valentine Quin (the grandfather of the 1st Earl of Dunraven and Mount-Earl, who was also 1st Viscount Mount-Earl). Together, they were the parents of two sons and two daughters, including:

- Lady Mary Taylour (1782–1843), Lady of the Bedchamber to Princess Augusta.
- Thomas Taylour, 2nd Marquess of Headfort (1787–1870), married Olivia (née Stevenson) Dalton, daughter of composer Sir John Andrew Stevenson and widow of Edward Tuite Dalton (from this marriage she was the mother of Adelaide Dalton, wife of John Young, 1st Baron Lisgar), in 1822. After her death in 1834, he remarried to Lady Frances Macnaghten, a widow of British diplomat Sir William Hay Macnaghten.
- Lady Elizabeth Jane Taylour (1790–1837)
- Lord George Quin (né Taylour) (1792–1888), who married Lady Georgiana Charlotte Spencer (1794–1823), the second daughter of George Spencer, 2nd Earl Spencer, in 1814. After Lady Georgiana's death, in 1847 he married Louisa Ramsden, the eldest daughter of Sir John Ramsden, 4th Baronet and a granddaughter of Charles Ingram, 9th Viscount of Irvine.

Headfort eloped in 1803 with the wife of Reverend Charles D. Massy (son of Sir Hugh Dillon Massy), resulting in a lawsuit, 10,000 pounds damages and, for the plaintiff, one of John Philpot Curran's most famous speeches. Headfort died on 24 October 1829. His widow died on 12 August 1842.

Parliament of Ireland
Preceded by Thomas Pepper; Thomas Moore	Member of Parliament for Kells; 1776–1790; With: Thomas Moore 1776–1781; Hon. Hercules Taylour 1781–1790	Succeeded by Hon. Hercules Taylour; Hon. Thomas Pakenham
Preceded by Hon. Thomas Pakenham; Henry Stewart	Member of Parliament for Longford Borough; 1790–1794; With: Hon. Hercules Rowley 1790–1791; Henry Stewart 1791–1794	Succeeded by Thomas Pepper; Henry Stewart
Preceded by Hercules Langford Rowley; Hamilton Gorges	Member of Parliament for County Meath; 1794–1795; With: Hamilton Gorges	Succeeded by Hon. Clotworthy Taylor; Hamilton Gorges
Parliament of the United Kingdom
New title	Representative peer for Ireland; 1800–1829	Succeeded by The Viscount Doneraile
Peerage of Ireland
New creation	Marquess of Headfort; 1800–1829	Succeeded by Thomas Taylour
Preceded by Thomas Taylour	Earl of Bective; 1795–1829	Succeeded by Thomas Taylour
