= Hamilton Gorges (1737–1802) =

Anglo-Irish politician

Hamilton Gorges (1737 – 14 June 1802) was an Anglo-Irish politician.

Gorges was the son of Richard Gorges and Elizabeth Fielding. In 1770 he was High Sheriff of Meath.

Between 1792 and 1800, he sat in the Irish House of Commons as the Member of Parliament for County Meath. Despite attempts by the establishment to bribe him, he did not support the Acts of Union 1800. He subsequently represented County Meath in the House of Commons of the United Kingdom from 1801 until his death in June 1802. His family had to sell much of his estate in order to pay his debts.

Parliament of Ireland
Preceded by Hercules Langford Rowley; Gorges Lowther	Member of Parliament for County Meath; 1792–1800; With: Hercules Langford Rowley (1792–1794); Thomas Taylour, Viscount Headfort (1794–1795); Hon. Clotworthy Taylor (1795–1800); Marcus Somerville (1800)	Parliament of Ireland abolished
Parliament of the United Kingdom
New constituency	Member of Parliament for County Meath; 1801–1802; With: Sir Marcus Somerville, Bt	Succeeded by Thomas Cherburgh Bligh; Sir Marcus Somerville, Bt
