= Patrick Everard (Jacobite) =

Irish Jacobite politician (died 1720)

Patrick Everard (died 1720) was an Irish Jacobite politician and soldier.

Everard was the son of Richard Everard and Maud Netterville. In 1689, he was elected as a Member of Parliament for Kells in the Patriot Parliament summoned by James II of England. During the Williamite War in Ireland, Everard was a lieutenant in Sir Michael Creagh's Regiment of Infantry. He was attainted in 1691, forfeiting his estate.

Parliament of Ireland
Preceded by John Forth; Arthur Purefoy	Member of Parliament for Kells; 1689; With: John Delamare	Succeeded by John Dillon; Sir Thomas Taylor, Bt
