= Bodrhyddan Hall =

Country house in Rhuddlan, Wales

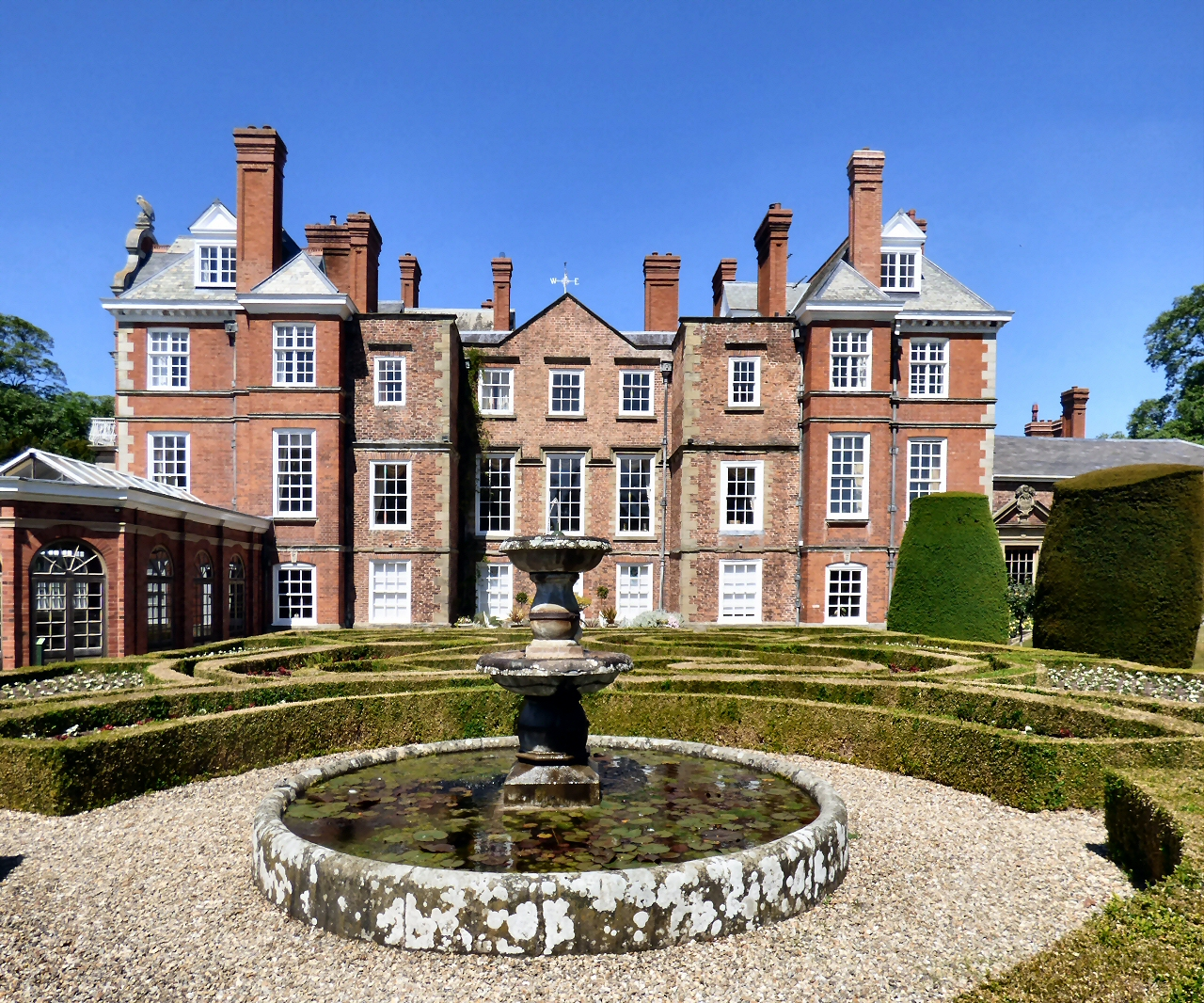
- South front and parterre
- Interactive map of the Bodrhyddan Hall area

General information
- Type: Country House
- Location: Rhyl, Denbighshire, Wales
- Coordinates: 53.29732°N 3.43282°W
- Completed: 1690s

Design and construction
- Designations: Grade I listed

Bodrhyddan Hall is a country house in Rhyl, Denbighshire, Wales. It is a Grade I listed building.

The present building is a 1690s remodelling of an earlier building dating from the 16th century. It was later upgraded by the architect William Eden Nesfield, who in 1875 added a new west facing entrance front and a service wing and refaced the east front.The hall is built in brick in 3 storeys with some terracotta detail and slate roofs. The west entrance frontage has 5 bays with a 4-storey projecting porch. The side elevations have 9 bays (arranged 2-1-3-1-2), the south front looking over a parterre.

Some of the garden features and outbuildings are also listed. The gardens and park are designated Grade II* on the Cadw/ICOMOS Register of Parks and Gardens of Special Historic Interest in Wales. The house and gardens may be visited by the public.

== History ==
Bodrhyddan traditionally belonged to the Conway family, descending in the male line until the death of the last male heir, Sir John Conway, 2nd Baronet, in 1721. Bodrhyddan then passed via his daughter Penelope to the Stapletons and eventually by marriage to Rev. William Davies Shipley, Dean of St Asaph. The dean's eldest son was killed in a shooting accident and so the Hall passed to his grandson William, who adopted the surname Shipley-Conwy.

Captain William Shipley-Conwy never married, and on his death the estate passed to his sister Charlotte, who was married to Richard Thomas Rowley, the second son of Baron Langford of Somerhill, County Meath. It then descended in that family, renamed Rowley-Conwy, to Rafe Grenville Rowley Conwy, who died unmarried in 1951, leaving the estate to his nephew the 9th Baron Langford. Lord Langford died at Bodrhyddan in 2017 at the age of 105 and was succeeded by his son Hon. Owain Grenville Rowley-Conwy.
