= Kells (Parliament of Ireland constituency) =

Pre-1801 Irish constituency

- Former borough constituency for the Irish House of Commons
- County: County Meath
- Borough: Kells

1561–1801
- Replaced by: Disfranchised

Kells was a constituency represented in the Irish House of Commons until 1800.

== History ==
In the Patriot Parliament of 1689 summoned by James II, Kells was not represented.

== Members of Parliament, 1561–1801 ==
- 1560 Thomas Shiele and Nicholas Ledwiche
- 1585 Thomas Fleming, Nicholas Dax and Patrick Plunkett
- 1613–1615 Oliver Plunket and Gerald Balfe
- 1634–1635 Walter Evers of Ballyardan and Adam Cusack of Trevett
- 1639–1649 Robert Cusack (expelled and replaced 1642 by William Ball) and Oliver Plunket (died and replaced 1641 by Patrick Barnewell. Barnewell died and replaced 1645 by Patrick Tallant)
- 1661–1666 John Forth, Arthur Purefoy, Richard Stephenson and Robert Shapcote (Shapcote did not sit).

=== 1689–1801 ===
Election	First MP	Second MP
1689	Patrick Everard	John Delamare
1692	Sir John Dillon	Sir Thomas Taylor, 1st Bt
1695	Charles Meredyth	Sir Thomas Taylor, 1st Bt
1703	Charles Meredyth	Brinsley Butler
1710	Henry Meredyth	Brinsley Butler
1713	Sir Thomas Taylor, 1st Bt	Thomas Taylor (Note: Succeeded as 2nd Baronet in 1736)
1737	James Taylor	Thomas Taylor
1747	Thomas Taylour (Note: Succeeded as 3rd Baronet in 1757)	Thomas Taylor
1757	Thomas Taylour	Richard Moore
1761	Thomas Pepper	Richard Moore
1768	Thomas Pepper	Thomas Moore
1776	Viscount Headfort	Thomas Moore
1781	Viscount Headfort	Hon. Hercules Taylour
1790	Hon. Thomas Pakenham	Hon. Hercules Taylour
1791	Hon. Thomas Pakenham	Hon. Robert Taylour
1798	Stephen Moore	Hon. Robert Taylour
1800	Stephen Moore	Thomas Pepper
1801	Disenfranchised	

== Bibliography ==
- O'Hart, John (2007). The Irish and Anglo-Irish Landed Gentry: When Cromwell came to Ireland. Vol. II. Heritage Books. ISBN 0-7884-1927-7.
- Leigh Rayment's historical List of Members of the Irish House of Commons. Cites: Johnston-Liik, Edith Mary (2002). The History of the Irish Parliament 1692-1800 (6 volumes). Ulster Historical Foundation.
