= Tayloria =

Tayloria is the scientific name for genera of organisms and may refer to:

- Tayloria (gastropod), a genus of land snails
- Tayloria (plant), a genus of mosses
