= Hercules Taylour =

Irish soldier and politician

Major Hercules Langford Taylour (9 September 1759 – 20 May 1790) styled The Honourable from 1760, was an Irish soldier and politician.

He was the second son of Thomas Taylour, 1st Earl of Bective and his wife Jane Rowley, daughter of Hercules Langford Rowley and Elizabeth Rowley, 1st Viscountess Langford. His older brother was Thomas Taylour, 1st Marquess of Headfort and his younger brothers were Robert Taylour and Clotworthy Rowley, 1st Baron Langford.

Taylour served in British Army and was major of the 5th Dragoon Guards (Princess Charlotte of Wales's). In 1781, he entered the Irish House of Commons for Kells, the same constituency his father had represented, and was Member of Parliament (MP) until his death in 1790. He never married nor sired any children.

Parliament of Ireland
Preceded by Thomas Moore; Viscount Headfort	Member of Parliament for Kells; 1781–1790; With: Viscount Headfort 1781–1790; Hon. Thomas Pakenham 1790	Succeeded by Hon. Thomas Pakenham; Hon. Robert Taylour
