= Geoffrey Rowley-Conwy, 9th Baron Langford =

British-Irish peer and soldier

Colonel The Right Honourable The Lord Langford OBE DL

Personal details
- Born: Geoffrey Alexander Rowley-Conwy; 8 March 1912
- Died: 12 November 2017 (aged 105) Rhuddlan, Denbighshire, Wales
- Spouse(s): Ruth St John Murphy (1939–1956, div.); Grete von Freiesleben (1957–1973, her death); Susan Winifred Denham (1975–2017, his death)
- Children: 5
- Parent(s): Major Geoffrey Seymour Rowley-Conwy; Bertha Gabrielle Cochran
- Education: Marlborough College; Royal Military Academy, Woolwich
- Military career
- Branch: British Army
- Service years: 1932–1957
- Rank: Colonel
- Unit: Royal Artillery
- Conflicts: Second World War: Battle of Singapore; Burma Campaign
- Awards: Officer of the Order of the British Empire (OBE)

Colonel Geoffrey Alexander Rowley-Conwy, 9th Baron Langford, OBE, DL (8 March 1912 – 12 November 2017) was a British-Irish peer and British Army officer. He is the longest-lived peer on record.

== Biography ==
The only son of two children born to Major Geoffrey Seymour Rowley-Conwy (1877 – 10 August 1915), who was killed in action at Gallipoli, and Bertha Gabrielle Cochran, JP (1880–1984), Langford was educated at Marlborough College and Royal Military Academy, Woolwich. Commissioned a second lieutenant in the Royal Artillery on 1 September 1932, he was promoted to lieutenant on 1 September 1935 and to captain on 1 September 1940.

He served as an army officer with the Royal Artillery in World War II, being captured at the Japanese taking of Singapore in 1942, but escaping, before seeing further active service in Burma. In May 1943, by then a temporary major, he was appointed an Officer of the Order of the British Empire (OBE), for distinguished service in the South-West Pacific theatre. He reached the rank of Lieutenant-Colonel in 1945, and was promoted to the substantive rank of major on 1 July 1946. On 1 April 1954, he was promoted to lieutenant colonel, and retired from the regular army on 31 December 1957. He was appointed an Honorary Colonel in 1967.

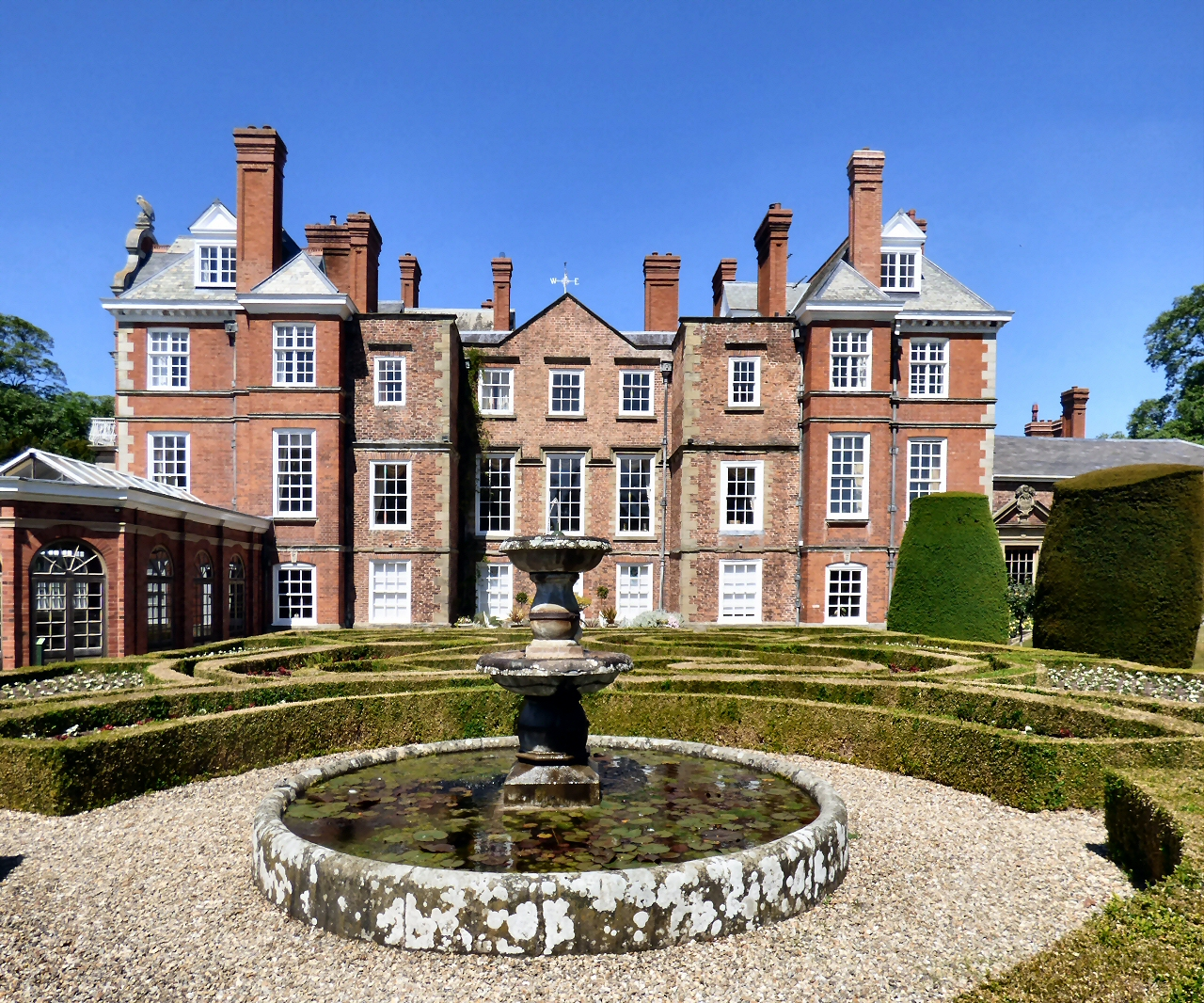
Bodrhyddan and parterre

He inherited the Bodrhyddan estate in Rhuddlan, on the death of his unmarried and childless paternal uncle Captain Rafe Grenville Rowley-Conwy RN CMG in April 1951 and succeeded to the Barony as the ninth holder of the title on the death of his childless second cousin once removed Arthur Sholto Langford Rowley, 8th Baron Langford CMG in August 1953. He was Constable of Rhuddlan Castle and Lord of the manor of Rhuddlan. He turned 100 in March 2012. He died on 12 November 2017 at the age of 105.

== Marriage and children ==
He married, firstly, Ruth St John Murphy (died 1991), on 24 January 1939. She was the daughter of Albert St John Murphy and Rose Davis, of The Island House, Little Island, County Cork, Ireland. They divorced in 1956. They had no children.

He married, secondly, Grete von Freiesleben (11 September 1922 – 16 January 1973), on 7 February 1957. She was the daughter of Colonel Erik Theodor Christian von Freiesleben, of Hjortekaer, Kongens Lyngby, Copenhagen, Ch Kings's Adj's Staff to His Majesty The King of Denmark. They had three children and seven grandchildren:

- Peter Alexander Rowley-Conwy (1951); he married Deborah Jane Stevens in 1979. They have two children:
  - Gabrielle Catrin Rowley-Conwy (1984)
  - Eleanor Rowley-Conwy (1986)
- John Seymour Rowley-Conwy (1955); he married Emma Brown in 1983. They have three children:
  - Katherine Grete Clare Rowley-Conwy (1985)
  - William Geoffrey Peter Rowley-Conwy (1988)
  - Huw Grenville Rowley-Conwy (1993)
- Owain Grenville Rowley-Conwy, 10th Baron Langford (27 December 1958); he married Joanna Featherstone on 3 May 1986. They have two children:They divorced and he married Lorraine Hennequin on the 17th Oct 2008 (now Lady Langford)
  - Hon. Thomas Alexander Rowley-Conwy (20 March 1987)
  - Hon. Magdalene Guinevere Rowley-Conwy (9 October 1988)

He married, thirdly, Susan Winifred Denham, daughter of Cyril Henry Charles Denham, of Wrexham, Denbighshire, Wales, on 3 February 1975. Lady Langford is a patron of St Kentigern Hospice, St Asaph. They have two children:

- Hon. Christopher Geoffrey Hugh Rowley-Conwy (19 March 1978); he married Robina Khan on 25 August 2007.
- Hon. Charlotte Susan Gabrielle Rowley-Conwy (9 October 1980).

He was succeeded by his third son (but the first legitimate son) from his second marriage, Hon. Owain Grenville Rowley-Conwy (born 1958).

== See also ==
- Peter Rowley-Conwy
- List of centenarians (royalty and nobility)

Peerage of Ireland
Preceded by Arthur Rowley	Baron Langford; 1953–2017	Succeeded by Owain Rowley-Conwy
