= Terence Taylour, 5th Marquess of Headfort =

British Army officer and peer (1902–60)

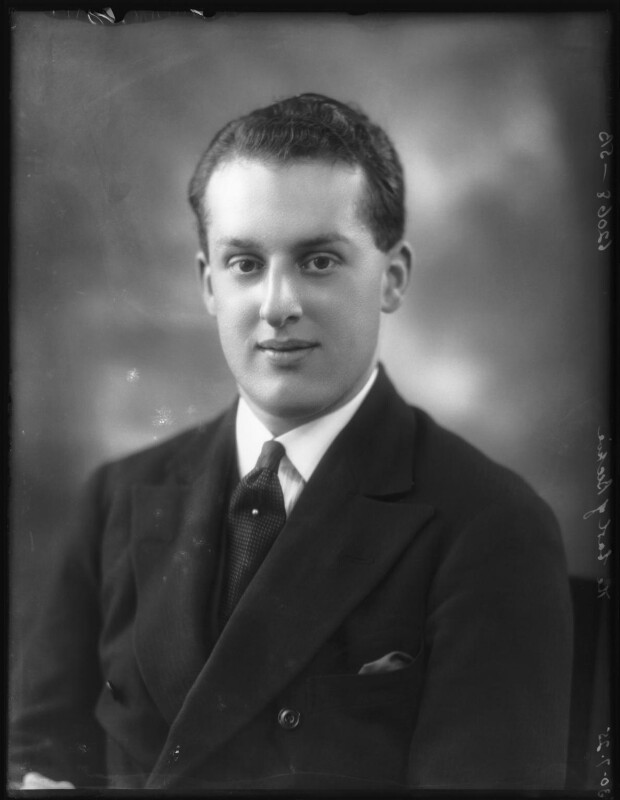
Taylour in 1923

Terence Geoffrey Thomas Taylour, 5th Marquess of Headfort, TD (1 May 1902 – 24 October 1960) was an Anglo-Irish soldier and peer, a member of the House of Lords from 1943 until his death. He was known as Earl of Bective before that.

== Biography ==
The son of Geoffrey Taylour, 4th Marquess of Headfort, and his wife Rosie Boote, he was educated at Harrow School and Magdalen College, Oxford. While at university, he was a cadet of Oxford University's contingent of the Officers Training Corps.

On 21 June 1926, the then Earl of Bective was commissioned as a second lieutenant in the Warwickshire Yeomanry, Territorial Army. He was promoted to lieutenant on 21 June 1929, and to captain on 27 April 1935. He was aide-de-camp to the Governor of South Australia between 1939 and 1940, then between 1941 and 1942 was a Staff Captain with the Australian Military Forces. In 1943 he joined the War Office Military Secretary's Branch. He was awarded the Efficiency Decoration (TD) in 1943 for long service in the Territorial Army. Having reached the age limit, he retired from the Territorial Army Reserve of Officers on 20 August 1952 and was given permission to retain the rank of captain.

On 29 January 1943, he succeeded his father as Marquess of Headfort (I., 1800), Earl of Bective (I., 1766), Viscount Headfort (I., 1762), Baron Headfort (I., 1760), and Baron Kenlis (U.K., 1831); he also became the eighth Taylor baronet (I., 1704).

On 18 September 1928, as Earl of Bective, he married Elise Florence Tucker, daughter of James Partridge Tucker and Marion Kinnear, and they had two children:

- Lady Olivia Elsie June Taylour (1929–2009)
- Thomas Taylour, 6th Marquess of Headfort (1932–2005)

Peerage of Ireland
Preceded by Geoffrey Thomas Taylour	Marquess of Headfort; 1943–1960	Succeeded by Thomas Geoffrey Charles Michael Taylour
