= Robert Taylor (British Army officer) =

Irish soldier and politician

General Robert Taylor or Taylour (26 November 1760 – 23 April 1839), styled The Honourable from birth, was an Irish soldier and politician.

== Background ==
He was the third son of Thomas Taylour, 1st Earl of Bective and his wife Jane Rowley, daughter of Hercules Langford Rowley and Elizabeth Rowley, 1st Viscountess Langford. His older brother was Thomas Taylour, 1st Marquess of Headfort and his younger brother was Clotworthy Rowley, 1st Baron Langford. Taylour died at Davestown unmarried and childless.

== Career ==
Taylour entered the British Army as a cornet in the 5th Dragoons in 1783. He purchased his lieutenancy in 1784 and captaincy in 1785. In June 1790 he purchased his commission as a major, and as a lieutenant-colonel in 1792. He served with his regiment first in Ireland, then from 1793 in the French Revolutionary Wars in Flanders and Germany, being brevetted colonel in 1796. During the Irish Rebellion of 1798 Taylour was promoted to brigadier-general in Ireland, and was second in command in the Battle of Ballinamuck, where he was mentioned in dispatches by his superior, General Lake In 1801, he became major-general, and saw service in Ireland from 1803 to 1808, when he became a lieutenant-general. Taylour was brevetted a full general in August 1819 and received the colonelcy of the 6th Regiment of Dragoons Guards two years later.

In 1790, he was elected to the Irish House of Commons for Kells, the same constituency his father and his older brother Hercules had represented before, and sat as Member of Parliament (MP) until 1800.

Parliament of Ireland
Preceded by Hon. Hercules Taylour; Hon. Thomas Pakenham	Member of Parliament for Kells; 1790–1800; With: Hon. Thomas Pakenham 1790–98; Stephen Moore 1798–1800	Succeeded by Stephen Moore; Thomas Pepper
Military offices
Preceded by The Earl of Carhampton	Colonel of the 6th Regiment of Dragoons Guards; 1821–1839	Succeeded by Sir Thomas Hawker
