= Michael Taylour, 6th Marquess of Headfort =

Irish peer, aircraft salesman, and politician

The Most Honourable The Marquess of Headfort

Lord Temporal
- In office 1960–1999

Personal details
- Born: 20 January 1932
- Died: 21 October 2005 (aged 73) Manila, Philippines
- Spouse(s): Elizabeth Nall-Cain (1958–1968); Virginia Nable (1972–2005)
- Children: 3
- Parent(s): The 5th Marquess of Headfort; Elise Florense Tucker

Thomas Geoffrey Charles Michael Taylour, 6th Marquess of Headfort (20 January 1932 – 21 October 2005), styled Earl of Bective until 1960, was an Irish peer, aircraft salesman, and politician.

== Biography ==
Thomas Geoffrey Charles Michael Taylour, known to family and friends simply as Michael, was born on 20 January 1932 to Terence Geoffrey Thomas Taylour, 5th Marquess of Headfort and Elise Florense Tucker.

He was educated at Stowe School in Stowe, Buckinghamshire, England, before attending Christ's College, Cambridge. While there, he was a member of the university air squadron. It was during this time, also, that he had his first brush with the law, being fined for £2 for driving in Acton with his arm around a girl. In 1955 he received his Bachelor of Arts, and four years later a Master of Arts. He received a certificate of proficiency in rural estate management from Christ's College. He also received his qualification as a commercial pilot.

In 1953, he began his career working as a director at Bective Electrical Co., before working as a sales manager and chief pilot at Lancashire Aircraft Co. in 1959.

In 1958, he married The Hon. Elizabeth Angela Veronica Rose Nall-Cain, a goddaughter of Queen Elizabeth The Queen Mother and the sole daughter of the 2nd Baron Brocket at St James's Church, Spanish Place. Two years later, the couple travelled to Africa, selling aircraft. With her he had three children:

- Thomas Michael Ronald Christopher Taylour, 7th Marquess of Headfort (b. 10 February 1959)
- Lady Rosanagh Elizabeth Angela Mary Taylour (b. 20 January 1961)
- Lady Olivia Sheelin Davina Anne Taylour (b. 4 October 1963)

Following his father's sudden death in Monte Carlo in October 1960, he acceded to become the Marquess of Headfort on 24 October. His maiden speech as a member of the House of Lords discussed air safety, and he quickly became interested in politics, particularly Irish politics. He ran for the Seanad Éireann, the Irish Senate, in 1973 with only the nomination the Irish Georgian Society in 1973, but lost with only a few votes.

By 1968, his marriage with Elizabeth Nall-Cain was collapsing, and the ensuing divorce proceedings in 1969 in the Isle of Man led the legal disputes with her and other family members, causing significant financial hardship. He was forced to sell Headfort House, the historic seat of the Marquess of Headfort, for £1 million, to B.J. Kruger, a Canadian multimillionaire. His departure was the cause of much mourning by estate workers, as he was well liked. By now, all that remained of his inheritance were 16 acres of bog in County Cavan.

For some time afterward, he lived in Hong Kong, where he was an honorary Inspector of Police. He later moved to the Philippines, the home of his second wife, Virginia Nable, a friend of Imelda Marcos. The two married in 1972. Settling in a bungalow complex called Kenlis House on Lubang Island, he was active in the coast guard and donated a public library to the local municipality. He also maintained a residence in Manila.

In 1987, he gave his final speech in the House of Lords. The speech was a tribute to the accomplishments of Alcoholics Anonymous.

On 21 October 2005, he died at the age of 73. His funeral took place in Manila, Philippines.

== Mental health ==
The Marquis of Headfort suffered from bipolar disorder that occasionally necessitated hospitalisation. This was related to a period of alcoholism.

As a result, to these conditions, police intervention was required on at least one occasion in 1965, when, at the age of 33, he was escorted by the police to St Lawrence's Hospital, Bodmin, after hiring a waiter to row him out in a boat to an uninhabited island in the Isles of Scilly, and during the trip, asked him to kill Prime Minister Harold Wilson. This episode received national attention and was widely recorded, despite Headfort's later denial of the incident.

In another, unrelated, incident, neighbours reported how he had fired three blanks into the ceiling of a local pub during a party.

== Memberships ==
- Land Agents' Society
- Irish Auctioneers and Valuers Institute Council
- Royal Agricultural Society of England
- Royal Institution of Chartered Surveyors

== Arms ==
Coat of arms of Michael Taylour, 6th Marquess of Headfort
Coronet Coronet of a Marquess Crest A naked arm embowed couped at the shoulder holding an Arrow proper. Escutcheon Quarterly: 1st & 4th, Ermine, on a Chief Gules, a Fleur-de-lis between two Boar’s Heads couped and erect Or (Taylour); 2nd, Vert, a Pegasus courant, wings endorsed Ermine, a Chief Or, a Crescent for difference (Quin); 3rd, Argent, two Bendlets Gules, on a Chief Azure, a Lion passant Argent. Supporters Dexter: A Lion guardant Or, collared and chained Argent; Sinister: A Leopard guardant proper, collared and chained Argent. Motto CONSEQUITOR QUODCUNQUE PETIT (He obtains whatever he seeks)

Peerage of Ireland
Preceded by Terence Taylour	Marquess of Headfort; 1960–2005	Succeeded by Christopher Taylour
