= Sir Thomas Taylor, 1st Baronet =

Sir Thomas Taylor, 1st Baronet (25 July 1662 – 8 August 1736) was an Anglo-Irish politician.

Taylor was the son of Thomas Taylor, who had settled in Ireland from Sussex following the Cromwellian conquest of Ireland in 1652, and Anne Axtell. He sat in the Irish House of Commons as the Member of Parliament for Kells between 1692 and 1699. He then represented Belturbet from 1703 to 1713, before returning to sit for Kells from 1713 to 1736. In 1704 Taylor was created a baronet, of Kells in the Baronetage of Ireland.

He married Anne Cotton, daughter of Sir Robert Cotton, 1st Baronet, of Combermere and Hester Salusbury, on 20 June 1682. He was succeeded in his title by his eldest son, also called Thomas.

Parliament of Ireland
| Preceded by Patrick Everard; John Delamare | Member of Parliament for Kells; 1692–1699; With: Sir John Dillon (1692–1693); Charles Meredyth (1695–1699) | Succeeded by Theophilus Butler; Brinsley Butler |
| Preceded by Francis Butler; John Warburton | Member of Parliament for Belturbet; 1703–1713; With: Richard Tighe | Succeeded by Charles Meredyth; Brinsley Butler |
| Preceded by Henry Meredyth; Brinsley Butler | Member of Parliament for Kells; 1713–1736; With: Thomas Taylor | Succeeded by James Taylor; Thomas Taylor |
Baronetage of Ireland
| New creation | Baronet (of Kells); 1704–1736 | Succeeded by Thomas Taylor |
