= James Taylor (Irish politician) =

Anglo-Irish politician

James Taylor (20 January 1700 – May 1747) was an Anglo-Irish politician.

Taylor was the youngest son of Sir Thomas Taylor, 1st Baronet and Anne Cotton, daughter of Sir Robert Cotton, 1st Baronet, of Combermere. Between 1737 and his death in 1747, Taylor was a Member of Parliament for Kells in the Irish House of Commons.

Parliament of Ireland
Preceded by Sir Thomas Taylor, 1st Bt; Sir Thomas Taylor, 2nd Bt	Member of Parliament for Kells; 1737–1747; With: Sir Thomas Taylor, 2nd Bt	Succeeded by Thomas Taylour; Sir Thomas Taylor, 2nd Bt
