= Robert Taylour =

Irish Anglican priest

- Archdeacon of Kilmacduagh
- Other post: Dean of Clonfert

Personal details
- Died: May 1745
- Denomination: Anglicanism
- Education: Trinity College, Dublin

Robert Taylour (d. 1745) was an Anglican priest in Ireland in the first half of the eighteenth century.

Taylour was educated at Trinity College, Dublin. He was Archdeacon of Kilmacduagh from 1714 to 1726; and Dean of Clonfert from 1726 until his death in May 1745.
