= Lady Beatrix Stanley =

British aristocrat, horticulturalist and botanical artist

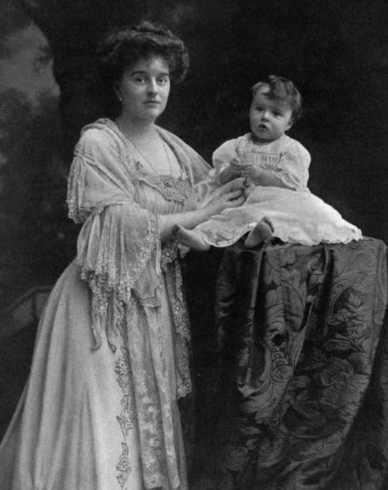
Stanley and her daughter Barbara posing for the cover of Country Life (Magazine)

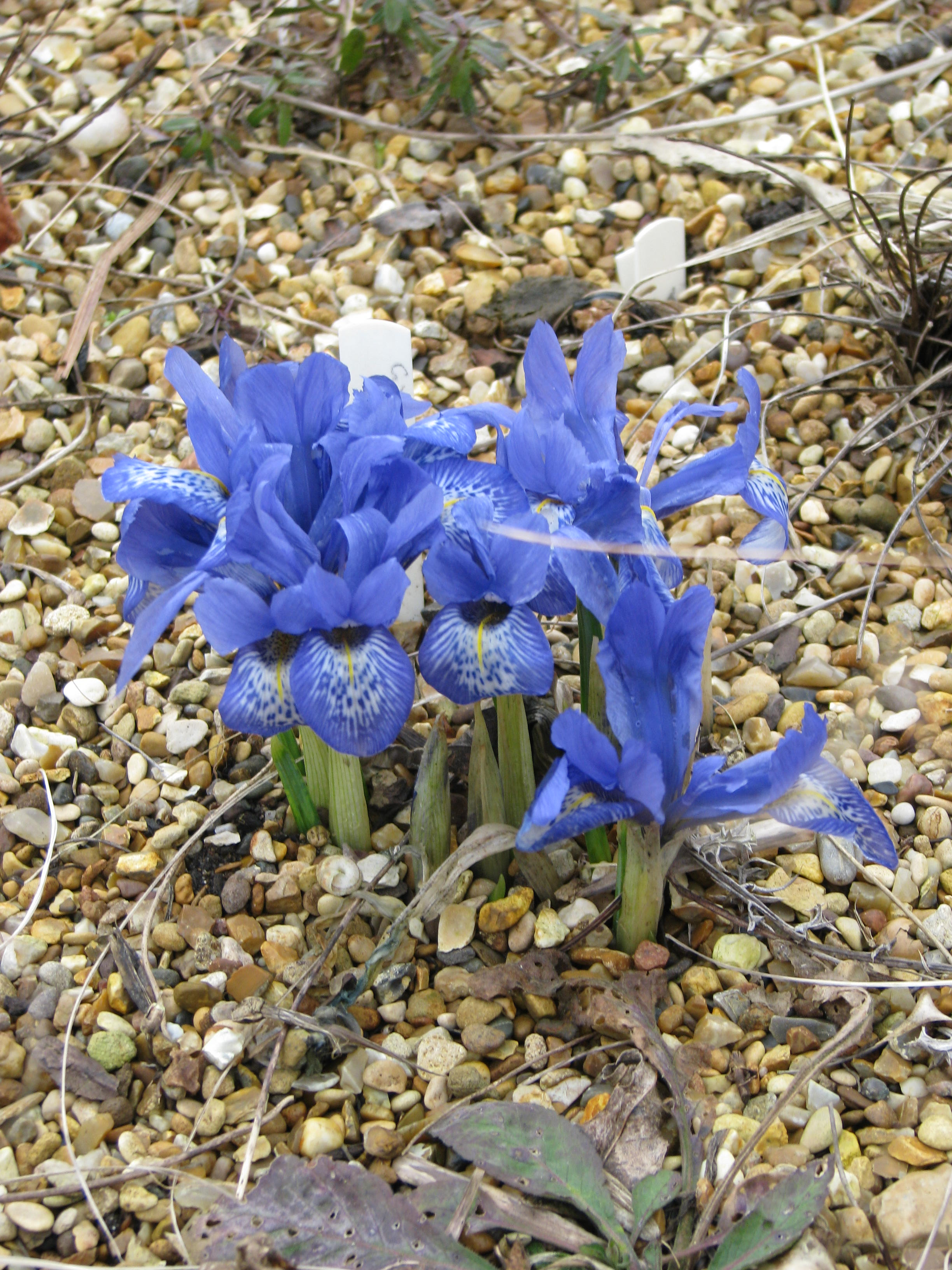
The Lady Beatrix Stanley Iris

Lady Beatrix Stanley, CI CBE (née Taylour; 6 January 1877 – 3 May 1944) was an English aristocrat, horticulturalist, and botanical artist who drew plants native to India. She had multiple flower strains named after her, most notably an iris and snowdrop. She was also a writer and was editor of a Royal Horticultural Society publication, The New Flora and Fauna in the 1930s.

== Life ==
Stanley was born on 6 January 1877 in Westminster, Greater London, to peer Thomas Taylour, the 3rd Marquess of Headfort, and his wife Emila Costantia Taylour, daughter of Rev. Lord John Thynne and granddaughter of Thomas Thynne, 2nd Marquess of Bath. Her brother Geoffrey Taylour, 4th Marquess of Headfort, succeeded their father as Marquess in 1894.

On 26 November 1903, at the age of 26, she married soldier and politician George Stanley, and they had a daughter, Barbara Helen Stanley (1906-1986), three years later. Stanley and an infant Barbara starred on the cover of Country Life magazine in July 1907.

On 26 October 1929, Stanley's husband was appointed governor of the Madras Presidency of British India. Stanley's body of watercolour work was created during her residency in India, in Ootacamund, Tamil Nadu, where she developed the gardens around their official residence. She studied the plants and gardening practises in the local climate with local fauna, as well as British plants which had been imported. The family returned to the UK in 1934.

Stanley also wrote about horticulture, including the article “Gardening in India,” published in the 23 May 1931 edition of The Gardener’s Chronicle. She also became editor of an RHS publication, The New Flora and Fauna, 1938 through 1940. She sat on the RHS Narcissus and Tulip Committee.

Stanley was appointed to the Order of the Crown of India. She was made CBE in the New Years Honours of 1920, for services to horticulture.

In 1938, Stanley's husband died. Stanley herself died six years later on 3 May 1944 at their family home of Sibbertoft Manor, Market Harborough, after a long illness. She was aged 67.

== Legacy ==
Stanley had multiple flower strains named after her, most notably an iris and snowdrop, such as Galanthus ‘Lady Beatrix Stanley’, a double snowdrop, which was named after her in 1981.

Stanley's daughter Barbara married Major Sir Charles James Buchanan. Through their descendants the bulbs that Stanley was so passionate about continue to be grown at the historic Hodsock Priory. The property and Stanley's watercolours are owned by Stanley's great-grandson, Andrew Buchanan.
