= Peter Rowley-Conwy =

British archaeologist

Peter Rowley-Conwy FSA
- Born: 1951 (age 74–75); Copenhagen, Denmark

Academic background
- Education: Marlborough College
- Alma mater: Magdalene College, Cambridge
- Thesis: Continuity and change in the prehistoric economics of Denmark 3700 BC to 2300 BC (1980)

Academic work
- Discipline: Archaeology
- Sub-discipline: Hunter-gatherers; Neolithic Agricultural revolution; Three-Age System; hunter-gatherers; history of agriculture; osteoarchaeology; pigs
- Institutions: Clare Hall, Cambridge; Memorial University of Newfoundland; Durham University

Peter Rowley-Conwy, FSA (born 1951) is a British archaeologist and academic. He was Professor of Archaeology at Durham University from 2007 to 2020, having joined the university as a lecturer in 1990: he is now professor emeritus. He had previously taught and researched at Clare Hall, Cambridge and the Memorial University of Newfoundland.

== Early life and education ==
Rowley-Conwy was born in Copenhagen in 1951. He is the son of Geoffrey Alexander Rowley-Conwy, 9th Baron Langford and Grete von Freiesleben. He attended Marlborough College, and studied archaeology at Magdalene College, Cambridge, graduating in 1973. He also studied for a doctorate at Cambridge, under Grahame Clark, which he received in 1980. His thesis was on the Mesolithic–Neolithic transition in Denmark.

== Academic career ==
After completing his PhD, from 1982 to 1985 Rowley-Conwy worked on the Tell Abu Hureyra project, directed by Anthony Legge, and later held the position of research fellow at Clare Hall, University of Cambridge (1986–88, 1989–90). He spent the year 1988–89 as an associate professor in the Department of Anthropology, Memorial University of Newfoundland. In 1990, Rowley-Conwy was appointed to a lectureship in the Department of Archaeology at Durham University, where he was promoted to Reader in 1996 and professor in 2007. He retired in 2020, and was appointed Professor Emeritus by Durham.

=== Research ===
Rowley-Conwy's research has focussed on hunter-gatherers and early farmers, in particular the nature of the transition between these cultural episodes. He also has an interest in the history of archaeological approaches to that period. A specialist on faunal remains and their contribution to archaeology, he has published widely on European material, including in Scandinavia and Britain, and analysed the major faunal assemblage from Arene Candide in Italy. Since 2000 he has run the Durham Pig Project, which has examined pig domestication around the world by a variety of means. Beyond Europe, his work on the animal bones from Tell Abu Hureyra has been published. Rowley-Conwy has collaborated in a book on the anthropology and archaeology of hunter-gatherers. His work on the remains of agricultural crop plants from Qasr Ibrim (in collaboration with Dr. Alan Clapham) is in course of publication.

Rowley-Conwy has also written about the history of Christian Jürgensen Thomsen's three age system (Stone Age – Bronze Age – Iron Age), and its impact on archaeology in Denmark, Britain and Ireland.

== Honours ==
Rowley-Conwy was elected Fellow of the Society of Antiquaries (FSA) on 2 July 2009.
