= Clotworthy Rowley, 1st Baron Langford =

Irish politician (1763-1825)

Clotworthy Rowley 1st Baron Langford

Member of Parliament for Trim
- In office 1791–1795 Serving with Hon. Arthur Wesley
- Preceded by: Hon. Arthur Wesley; John Pomeroy
- Succeeded by: Hon. Arthur Wesley; Hon. Henry Wellesley

Member of Parliament for County Meath
- In office 1795–1800 Serving with Hamilton Gorges
- Preceded by: Thomas Taylour, Viscount Headfort; Hamilton Gorges
- Succeeded by: Hamilton Gorges; Marcus Somerville

Personal details
- Born: 31 October 1763
- Died: 13 September 1825 (aged 61)
- Parents: Thomas Taylour, 1st Earl of Bective (father); Jane Rowley (mother)
- Relatives: Hercules Langford Rowley (grandfather); Thomas Taylour (brother); Hercules Taylour (brother); Robert Taylour (brother)

Clotworthy Rowley, 1st Baron Langford (31 October 1763 – 13 September 1825), known as Hon. Clotworthy Taylor until 1796 and as Hon. Clotworthy Rowley from 1796 to 1800, was an Irish peer.

Langford was the fourth son of Thomas Taylor, 1st Earl of Bective, and his wife Jane Rowley, daughter of Hercules Langford Rowley and his wife Elizabeth Rowley, 1st Viscountess Langford (a title which became extinct in 1796). Thomas Taylour, 1st Marquess of Headfort, Hercules Taylour and General Robert Taylour were his elder brothers. He succeeded to the Rowley estates in 1796 and assumed the same year by Royal licence the surname of Rowley in lieu of Taylor. Rowley represented Trim in the Irish House of Commons from 1791 to 1795. Subsequently, he sat for County Meath until 1800, when the Langford title was revived and Taylor was raised to the Peerage of Ireland as Baron Langford, of Summerhill in the County of Meath.

Lord Langford died in September 1825, aged 61, and was succeeded in the barony by his son Hercules.

Parliament of Ireland
Preceded by Hon. Arthur Wesley; John Pomeroy	Member of Parliament for Trim; 1791–1795; With: Hon. Arthur Wesley	Succeeded by Hon. Arthur Wesley; Hon. Henry Wellesley
Preceded by Thomas Taylour, Viscount Headfort; Hamilton Gorges	Member of Parliament for County Meath; 1795–1800; With: Hamilton Gorges	Succeeded by Hamilton Gorges; Marcus Somerville
Peerage of Ireland
New creation	Baron Langford; 1800 – 1825	Succeeded by Hercules Langford Rowley
