= Sir Thomas Taylor, 2nd Baronet, of Kells =

Anglo-Irish politician (1686–1757)

Sir Thomas Taylor, 2nd Baronet (20 November 1686 – 18 September 1757) was an Anglo-Irish politician.

Taylor was the eldest son of Sir Thomas Taylor, 1st Baronet and Anne Cotton. He represented Kells in the Irish House of Commons between 1713 and his death in 1757. On 8 August 1736 he succeeded to his father's baronetcy and in 1753 he was made a member of the Privy Council of Ireland.

Taylor was succeeded by his son, also called Thomas Taylour, who was raised to the Peerage of Ireland as Baron Headfort in 1760 and was advanced to the title Earl of Bective in 1766.

Parliament of Ireland
Preceded by Henry Meredyth; Brinsley Butler	Member of Parliament for Kells; 1713–1757; With: Sir Thomas Taylor, Bt (1713–1736); James Taylor (1736–1747); Thomas Taylour (1747–1757)	Succeeded by Thomas Taylour; Richard Moore
Baronetage of Ireland
Preceded by Thomas Taylor	Baronet (of Kells); 1736–1757	Succeeded by Thomas Taylour
