= Hercules Rowley, 2nd Viscount Langford =

Anglo-Irish politician

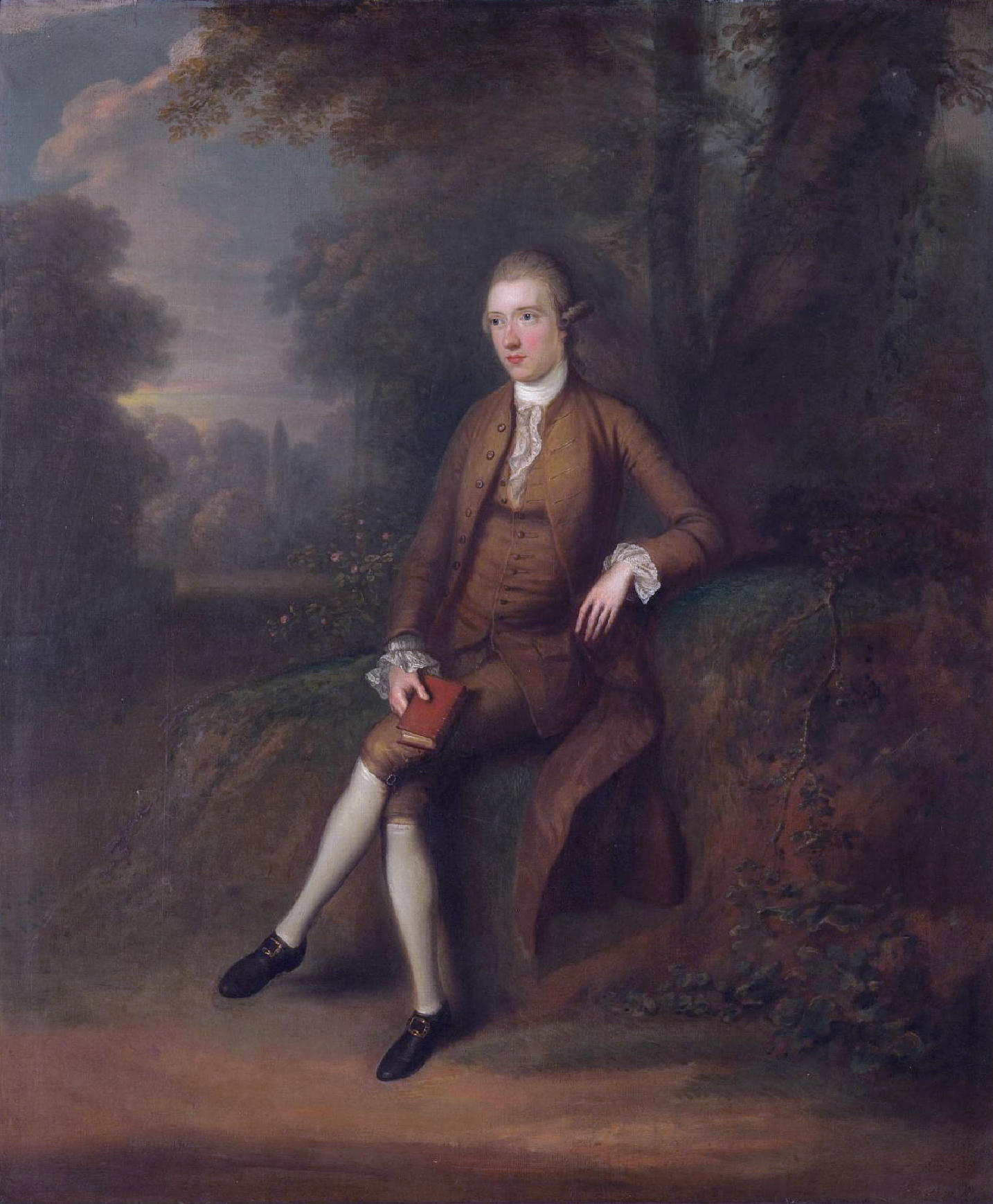
Portrait of Langford by Robert Hunter

Hercules Rowley, 2nd Viscount Langford (29 October 1737 – 24 March 1796), styled The Honourable Hercules Rowley between 1766 and 1791, was an Anglo-Irish politician. Rowley was the son of Hercules Rowley and Elizabeth Upton, 1st Viscountess Langford. At the 1783 Irish general election, he was returned to the Irish House of Commons for both County Antrim and Downpatrick. He chose to sit for County Antrim, a seat he held until 1791 when he succeeded his mother in the viscountcy and entered the Irish House of Lords. He was also elected for Longford in 1783 and 1790, but again chose to sit for County Antrim. Langford died unmarried in March 1796, aged 58. The viscountcy died with him.

Parliament of Ireland
Preceded by Hon. Henry Seymour-Conway; James Willson	Member of Parliament for County Antrim; 1783–1791; With: John O'Neill	Succeeded by John O'Neill; Edward Jones-Agnew
Peerage of Ireland
Preceded by Elizabeth Rowley	Viscount Langford; 1791–1796	Extinct
