= Meredyth family =

The Meredyth family (sometimes spelled Meredith) were an Anglo-Irish family descending from Richard Meredith, a Welsh clergyman who went to Ireland in 1584 and became Bishop of Leighlin.

Family tree

Richard (died 1597); Bishop of Leighlin
Sir Robert (died 1668); Chancellor of the Exchequer	Sir Thomas (died 1677); MP for Old Leighlin
Sir William (died 1665); 1st Baronet, of Greenhills	Sir Charles (died 1700); Chancellor of the Exchequer	Robert	Charles (died 1710); MP for Meath and Kells	Arthur (1639–1732); MP for Navan
parentage uncertain
Richard (1657–1743); MP for Athy; de jure 2nd Baronet?	Henry (1675–1715); MP for Kells and Navan	Thomas (died 1732); MP for Wexford, New Ross and Navan	Thomas (1665–1719); MP for Navan, Lismore and Midhurst
Robert (died 1747) de jure 3rd Baronet?	Paul (died 1783) de jure 5th Baronet?	Moore (died 1789) de jure 6th Baronet?	Joshua (died 1787)	Charles (died 1747) dean of Ardfert	Thomas (died 1773)	Henry (died 1789); MP for Armagh	Arthur Francis (1726–1775); MP for Meath
Richard (1733–1777) de jure 4th Baronet?	Sir Barry Colles (died 1813); 7th Baronet	Sir John (1740–1799); 1st Baronet, of Carlandstown	Mary married Sir Richard Gorges-Meredyth, 1st Baronet
Sir Joshua Colles (1771–1850); 8th Baronet	Sir Edward Newenham (1776–1865); 9th Baronet	Sir Thomas (1770–1815); 2nd Baronet	Sir Henry (1775–1859); 3rd Baronet	Mary Anne married Sir Marcus Somerville, 4th Baronet
Sir Edward Henry John (1828–1904); 10th Baronet	Sir Henry (1802–1889); 4th Baronet	William Meredyth Somerville (1802–1873); 1st Baron Athlumney and Meredyth
Henry William (died 1878)	James Herbert Gustavus Meredyth Somerville (1865–1929); 2nd Baron Athlumney and Meredyth
Sir Henry Bayly (1863–1923} 5th Baronet
