= Meredyth baronets =

Extinct baronetcy in the Baronetage of Ireland

There have been two baronetcies created for persons with the surname Meredyth, both in the Baronetage of Ireland. Both are extinct.

The Meredyth Baronetcy, of Greenhills in County Kildare, was created in the Baronetage of Ireland on 20 November 1660 for William Meredyth, son of Sir Robert Meredyth, Chancellor of the Exchequer of Ireland. The title became extinct on the death of the twelfth Baronet in 1933.

The Meredyth Baronetcy, of Carlandstown in County Meath, was created in the Baronetage of Ireland on 26 July 1795 for John Meredyth, son of Thomas Meredyth and Alicia Tisdall, daughter of Philip Tisdall, Attorney General for Ireland and his wife Mary Singleton. He was High Sheriff of Meath for 1783 and knighted the same year. The fourth baronet was High Sheriff of Meath in 1836. The fifth Baronet was High Sheriff of County Kilkenny for 1888; the title became extinct on his death in 1923.

== Meredyth baronets, of Greenhills, Co Kildare (1660) ==
- Sir William Meredyth, 1st Baronet (c. 1620 – 14 February 1665)
- Sir Richard Meredyth, 2nd Baronet (1657 – 8 October 1743)
- Sir Robert Meredyth, 3rd Baronet (c. 1704 – 18 February 1747)
- Sir Richard Meredyth, 4th Baronet (January 1733 – 1777)
- Sir Paul Meredyth, 5th Baronet (c. 1720–1783)
- Sir Moore Meredyth, 6th Baronet (c. 1722 – 8 November 1789)
- Sir Barry Colles Meredyth, 7th Baronet (c. 1749 – 14 October 1813)
- Sir Joshua Colles Meredyth, 8th Baronet (1 June 1771 – 27 July 1850)
- Sir Edward Newenham Meredyth, 9th Baronet (1 May 1776 – 23 March 1865)
- Sir Edward Henry John Meredyth, 10th Baronet (29 May 1828 – 8 October 1904)
- Sir George Augustus Jervis Meredyth, 11th Baronet (11 Dec 1832 – 16 May 1907)
- Sir Charles George, 12th Baronet (4 July 1856 – 1933).

== Meredyth baronets, of Carlandstown, County Meath (1795) ==
- Sir John Meredyth, 1st Baronet (late 1740 – 27 October 1799)
- Sir Thomas Meredyth, 2nd Baronet (July 1770 – c. February 1815)
- Sir Henry Meredyth, 3rd Baronet (June 1775 – 2 May 1859)
- Sir Henry Meredyth, 4th Baronet (1802 – 4 August 1889)
- Sir Henry Bayly Meredyth, 5th Baronet (14 January 1863 – 30 September 1923) baronetcy extinct on his death.
  - Millicent Valla (b. 1898) first married in 1919 Major the Hon. Herbrand Charles Alexander, D.S.O, formerly 5th Lancers, who obtained a divorce in 1927. She later married Richard Allan.

== See also ==
Family tree

Richard (died 1597); Bishop of Leighlin
Sir Robert (died 1668); Chancellor of the Exchequer	Sir Thomas (died 1677); MP for Old Leighlin
Sir William (died 1665); 1st Baronet, of Greenhills	Sir Charles (died 1700); Chancellor of the Exchequer	Robert	Charles (died 1710); MP for Meath and Kells	Arthur (1639–1732); MP for Navan
parentage uncertain
Richard (1657–1743); MP for Athy; de jure 2nd Baronet?	Henry (1675–1715); MP for Kells and Navan	Thomas (died 1732); MP for Wexford, New Ross and Navan	Thomas (1665–1719); MP for Navan, Lismore and Midhurst
Robert (died 1747) de jure 3rd Baronet?	Paul (died 1783) de jure 5th Baronet?	Moore (died 1789) de jure 6th Baronet?	Joshua (died 1787)	Charles (died 1747) dean of Ardfert	Thomas (died 1773)	Henry (died 1789); MP for Armagh	Arthur Francis (1726–1775); MP for Meath
Richard (1733–1777) de jure 4th Baronet?	Sir Barry Colles (died 1813); 7th Baronet	Sir John (1740–1799); 1st Baronet, of Carlandstown	Mary married Sir Richard Gorges-Meredyth, 1st Baronet
Sir Joshua Colles (1771–1850); 8th Baronet	Sir Edward Newenham (1776–1865); 9th Baronet	Sir Thomas (1770–1815); 2nd Baronet	Sir Henry (1775–1859); 3rd Baronet	Mary Anne married Sir Marcus Somerville, 4th Baronet
Sir Edward Henry John (1828–1904); 10th Baronet	Sir Henry (1802–1889); 4th Baronet	William Meredyth Somerville (1802–1873); 1st Baron Athlumney and Meredyth
Henry William (died 1878)	James Herbert Gustavus Meredyth Somerville (1865–1929); 2nd Baron Athlumney and Meredyth
Sir Henry Bayly (1863–1923} 5th Baronet

- Meredith baronets
