= Richard Meredith (bishop) =

Church of Ireland Bishop of Leighlin

Richard Meredith (sometimes Meredyth) (died 3 August 1597) was the Church of Ireland Bishop of Leighlin from 1589 until his death.

== Life ==
Meredith, descended from Gruffudd ap Cynan, was from Denbighshire, Wales. He was the son of Robert Meredith of Llanfair Talhaiarn and the nephew of George Smith, Chancellor of St. Asaph. He was educated at the University of Oxford, matriculating in 1568 and obtained degrees of Bachelor of Arts and Master of Arts in 1573 and 1575 respectively from Jesus College, Oxford. In 1578, he was prebendary at Brecon collegiate church and the rector of Barton, Pembrokeshire; in the following year, he became vicar of his native Llanafan Fawr in Brecknockshire and in 1580 the rector of Nangle, Pembrokeshire, and prebendary of St David's Cathedral, where his father's first cousin, Richard Davies, was bishop.

In the same year as his marriage he was appointed chaplain to Sir John Perrot, Lord Deputy of Ireland and Dean of St Patrick's Cathedral, Dublin. He was appointed Bishop of Leighlin in 1589 (but not also, as is sometimes thought, Bishop of Ferns; the two sees not being merged until after his death). Meredith continued as Dean of St Patrick's, given the poverty of his diocese. He was accused of treasonous correspondence once Perrot had returned to England in 1588, but Meredith showed the evidence to be forgeries. His support for Perrot led to his imprisonment in the Fleet Prison and an appearance before the Star Chamber, leading to a fine of £2,000 (later remitted in return for an annual payment to the queen of 300 marks for 10 years). He was in ill-health by 1593 and died in 1597; he was buried in St Patrick's.

== Family and descendants ==
In 1584, he married Sarah Bathow (died 1650), who remarried Adam Loftus, 1st Viscount Loftus after his death. Their elder son, Robert Meredyth (1585–1668) M.P., was Chancellor of the Irish Exchequer and married (1st) Anne Ussher, daughter of Sir William Ussher Knight and his first wife Isabella Loftus, daughter of Adam Loftus, Archbishop of Dublin.

Their younger son, Sir Thomas Meredith (died 1677), was the Member of Parliament for Old Leighlin, Co. Carlow, and ancestor of the Baronets of Dollardstown, Newtown and Carlandstown, Co. Meath. Their grandson Sir William Meredith was the 1st (and only) Baronet of Greenhills and Shrowland, Co. Kildare. He had no male heirs and the baronetcy became extinct upon his death. However, in 1808 a later descendant of the Bishop, Barry Colles Meredyth, was granted his claim to be the 7th Baronet, on the basis of a pedigree purporting to show direct descent from the childless 1st Baronet. The family's claim was finally shown to be false and disallowed by the Ulster King of Arms in 1904. A large monument in black and White marble stands in the North Transept of St. Patrick's Cathedral to Bishop Meredith.

Family tree

Richard (died 1597); Bishop of Leighlin
Sir Robert (died 1668); Chancellor of the Exchequer	Sir Thomas (died 1677); MP for Old Leighlin
Sir William (died 1665); 1st Baronet, of Greenhills	Sir Charles (died 1700); Chancellor of the Exchequer	Robert	Charles (died 1710); MP for Meath and Kells	Arthur (1639–1732); MP for Navan
parentage uncertain
Richard (1657–1743); MP for Athy; de jure 2nd Baronet?	Henry (1675–1715); MP for Kells and Navan	Thomas (died 1732); MP for Wexford, New Ross and Navan	Thomas (1665–1719); MP for Navan, Lismore and Midhurst
Robert (died 1747) de jure 3rd Baronet?	Paul (died 1783) de jure 5th Baronet?	Moore (died 1789) de jure 6th Baronet?	Joshua (died 1787)	Charles (died 1747) dean of Ardfert	Thomas (died 1773)	Henry (died 1789); MP for Armagh	Arthur Francis (1726–1775); MP for Meath
Richard (1733–1777) de jure 4th Baronet?	Sir Barry Colles (died 1813); 7th Baronet	Sir John (1740–1799); 1st Baronet, of Carlandstown	Mary married Sir Richard Gorges-Meredyth, 1st Baronet
Sir Joshua Colles (1771–1850); 8th Baronet	Sir Edward Newenham (1776–1865); 9th Baronet	Sir Thomas (1770–1815); 2nd Baronet	Sir Henry (1775–1859); 3rd Baronet	Mary Anne married Sir Marcus Somerville, 4th Baronet
Sir Edward Henry John (1828–1904); 10th Baronet	Sir Henry (1802–1889); 4th Baronet	William Meredyth Somerville (1802–1873); 1st Baron Athlumney and Meredyth
Henry William (died 1878)	James Herbert Gustavus Meredyth Somerville (1865–1929); 2nd Baron Athlumney and Meredyth
Sir Henry Bayly (1863–1923} 5th Baronet
