= List of Irish MPs 1560 =

This is a list of members of the Irish House of Commons in 1560.

Name	Constituency	Province and (for boroughs) present-day county	Notes
Walter Dowdall	Ardee (then known as Athird)	Leinster – County Louth	From an Old English merchant family.
Walter Babe	Ardee (then known as Athird)	Leinster – County Louth	From an Old English merchant family.
	Ards	Ulster	Included in the lists of members, but not shired until 1570 and the names of the knights are blank
Michael Moore	Athboy	Leinster – County Meath	A local merchant.
James Blake	Athboy	Leinster – County Meath	A cousin of the Galway Blakes and a local merchant.
Sir Thomas Cusack	Athenry	Connacht – County Galway	Former Lord Chancellor of Ireland. An "obvious outsider ... it is more surprising that he was returned for a seat outside his own home area of Meath than that he represented Athenry."
Andrew Browne	Athenry	Connacht – County Galway	A member of the family which controlled Athenry
Richard Mothill	Athy	Leinster – County Kildare	McGrath suggests that the constituency was not incorporated until 1613.
Rowland Cassyn	Athy	Leinster – County Kildare	McGrath suggests that the constituency was not incorporated until 1613.
John Neill	Carlingford	Leinster – County Louth	From a local merchant family
Sir Henry Radclyffe	Carlingford	Leinster – County Louth	Constable of Maryborough
James Wingfield	Carrickfergus	Ulster – County Antrim	Settler, soldier and constable of Dublin Castle
Humphrey Warren	Carrickfergus	Ulster – County Antrim	Settler
Henry White	Clonmel	Munster – County Tipperary	Member of an important local family.
John Strich	Clonmel	Munster – County Tipperary	Merchant. A surname more usually associated with Cork than Clonmel.
	Connacht (Note: The medieval county of Connacht was subdivided in 1570 into the modern counties of Galway and Mayo.)	Connacht	The province was a single large shire until 1570. The identity of the 1560 knights is unknown.
John Meade	Cork City	Munster – County Cork	Generosus A member of one of the city's old ruling families
Stephen Coppinger	Cork City	Munster – County Cork	Generosus A member of one of the city's old ruling families
	County Antrim	Ulster	Included in the lists of members, but not shired until 1570 and the names of the knights are blank
Sir William FitzWilliam	County Carlow	Leinster	Knight Vice-Treasurer of Ireland, although McGrath says that he was Chief Governor
Edmund Butler	County Carlow	Leinster	Gentleman A younger son of James Butler, 9th Earl of Ormond
	County Clare	Munster	The list of members of the 1560 parliament includes Clare, but not its MPs
	County Cork	Munster	The names of the knights are blank in the list in 'Tracts relating to Ireland'.
	County Down	Ulster	Included in the lists of members, but not shired until 1570 and the names of the knights are blank
Thomas Fitzwilliam	County Dublin	Leinster	Of Holmpatrick – Armiger A major landowner in the county and an influential member of his community
Patrick Finglas	County Dublin	Leinster	Of Westphailstown – Armiger (Note: McGrath states that he was Chief Baron of the Irish Exchequer, but Patrick Finglas, who had held that office, had died in 1537.) A major landowner in the county and an influential member of his community
	County Kerry	Munster	The names of the knights are blank in the list in 'Tracts relating to Ireland'.
Nicholas Eustace	County Kildare	Leinster	Of Cradokeston A Roman Catholic from an old-established Old English local gentry family
James Flattisbury	County Kildare	Leinster	Of Johnstown A Roman Catholic from an old-established Old English local gentry family
Nicholas White	County Kilkenny	Leinster	Of Whitehall, Wexford From Knocktopher – a member of a local Old English family with substantial property in the area citing
Walter Gall	County Kilkenny	Leinster	From Gallstown – a member of a local Old English family with substantial property in the area. He served as High Sheriff of Wexford in 1562 and as High Sheriff of County Kilkenny in 1572 citing See also
	County Limerick	Munster	The identity of the 1560 knights is unknown.
Nicholas Taaffe	County Louth	Leinster	Of Ballebragane – from a family established in the area for many centuries
Edward Dowdall	County Louth	Leinster	Of Glassepistell – from a family established in the area for many centuries
Sir Christopher Chevir (or Cheevers)	County Meath	Leinster	Knight – member of the local commission for musters and an important landowner in the county – one of the leaders of the anti-cess campaign
Patrick Barnewall	County Meath	Leinster	Of Stackallan – Armiger – member of the local commission for musters and an important landowner in the county – his son was MP for the county in 1569 and 1585 (which describes him as of Crickstown)
Patrick Sherlock	County Tipperary	Munster	From an old Norman family.
Oliver Grace	County Tipperary	Munster	From an old Norman family.
Thomas Power	County Waterford	Munster	Of Comshen From a major local Old English landholding family represented in every Parliament until 1639 except 1585.
Peter Aylward	County Waterford	Munster	Of Faithlike From a major local Old English landholding family.
Sir George Stanley	County Westmeath	Leinster	Knight – New English – Marshall of the Army (1553) and Commissioner for Ecclesiastical Causes (1562) citing
Sir Thomas Nugent	County Westmeath	Leinster	Knight – Old English
William Hore	County Wexford	Leinster	Of Harperstown – among the county's major landholders
Richard Synot	County Wexford	Leinster	Of Ballybrennan – among the county's major landholders – he was MP for Ferns in 1585 and his son Walter was MP for County Wexford in 1613
John Weston	Drogheda	Leinster – Counties Louth and Meath	Apparently a local merchant, of a family originally from Dublin
Robert Burnell	Drogheda	Leinster – Counties Louth and Meath	Apparently a local merchant, presumably of the north Dublin family usually based at Castleknock
James Stanihurst	Dublin City	Leinster – County Dublin	Recorder of Dublin
Robert Golding	Dublin City	Leinster – County Dublin	Alderman Lord Mayor of Dublin in 1558-9
Christopher More	Dundalk	Leinster – County Louth	A Roman Catholic.
Patrick Stanley	Dundalk	Leinster – County Louth	A Roman Catholic.
Henry Stafford (or Gifford)	Dungarvan	Munster – County Waterford	New English with no local connections.
John Challoner	Dungarvan	Munster – County Waterford	Secretary of State (Ireland) – new English with no local connections. citing
Nicholas Hackett	Fethard (County Tipperary)	Munster – County Tipperary	A member of an old English merchant family of strictly local significance which had been settled in the town for centuries.
Theobald Nash	Fethard (County Tipperary)	Munster – County Tipperary	A member of an old English merchant family of strictly local significance which had been settled in the town for centuries.
Jonoke Lynch	Galway Town	Connacht – County Galway	One of the Galway Lynches and an alderman of the city.
Peter Lynch	Galway Town	Connacht – County Galway	One of the Galway Lynches and an alderman of the city.
Thomas Shiele	Kells	Leinster – County Meath	From a family influential only within the Kells barony.
Nicholas Ledwiche	Kells	Leinster – County Meath	From a family influential only within the Kells barony.
John Abells	Kildare	Leinster – County Kildare	Little is known of him.
John Moore	Kildare	Leinster – County Kildare	Little is known of him.
Robert Shee	Kilkenny City	Leinster – County Kilkenny	From an important catholic merchant family Father of Elias Shee, MP for Kilkenny City in 1585 See also
Walter Archer	Kilkenny City	Leinster – County Kilkenny	From an important catholic merchant family See also
	Kilmallock	Munster – County Limerick	The identity of the 1560 knights is unknown.
	King's County	Leinster	The identity of its 1560 knights is unknown
Sir John Alan	Kinsale	Munster – County Cork	Knight A complete outsider
Francis Agar or Agard	Kinsale	Munster – County Cork	Armiger A complete outsider. Constable of Ferns and Wexford Castles, and Commissioner for Ecclesiastical Causes. citing
Edward Arthur	Limerick City	Munster – County Limerick	Wealthy, prominent citizen, an alderman who might have been expected to represent his city in Parliament. Mayor of Limerick in 1558.
Clement Fanning	Limerick City	Munster – County Limerick	Wealthy, prominent citizen, an alderman who might have been expected to represent his city in Parliament. Mayor of Limerick in 1557.
Nicholas Casey	Mullingar	Leinster – County Westmeath	A local Catholic merchant
James Reling	Mullingar	Leinster – County Westmeath	A local Catholic merchant, from a commercial family of equivalent local importance citing
John Sherlock	Naas	Leinster – County Kildare	A member of a local merchant family
Henry Draycott	Naas	Leinster – County Kildare	Chancellor of the Exchequer of Ireland and a new English settler
Patrick Warren	Navan	Leinster – County Meath	Member of a local family also called "Waring" – related to Thomas Warren (MP for Navan in 1585) and John Warren (lawyer and MP for Navan in 1613–15).
John Wakeley	Navan	Leinster – County Meath	New English settler, who acquired lands near Navan by 1547 and married Oliver Plunkett, 1st Baron Louth's daughter. Father of Thomas Wakeley, MP for Navan in 1585. The father and son both had many interests in King's County.
Nicholas Heron	New Ross	Leinster – County Wexford	Burgess – apparently from the local merchant community
William Dormer	New Ross	Leinster – County Wexford	Burgess – apparently from the local merchant community
	Queen's County	Leinster	Its 1560 members are unknown
Francis Cosby	Thomastown	Leinster – County Kilkenny	New English settler See also
Henry Colley	Thomastown	Leinster – County Kilkenny	New English settler
John Parker	Trim	Leinster – County Meath	Armiger – Englishman and Master of the Rolls
Patrick Martell	Trim	Leinster – County Meath	Local merchant
Maurice Wise	Waterford City	Munster – County Waterford	From a family active in the government and commercial life of the city and which also had other property in the county and surrounding areas.
Peter Stronge	Waterford City	Munster – County Waterford	From a family active in the government and commercial life of the city and which also had other property in the county and surrounding areas.
John Hassane	Wexford	Leinster – County Wexford	Active in the town's government and a member of its oligarchy. Seems to have been part of the town's strong merchant community.
Richard Talbot	Wexford	Leinster – County Wexford	Active in the town's government and a member of its oligarchy. A member of a local family. Seems to have been part of the town's strong merchant community.
John Walch	Youghal	Munster – County Cork	From one of the borough's old-established merchant families.
John Portyngall	Youghal	Munster – County Cork	From one of the borough's old-established merchant families.

The following present-day counties did not yet exist:

- Connaught:
  - County Galway
  - County Leitrim
  - County Mayo
  - County Roscommon
  - County Sligo
- Leinster:
  - County Longford
  - County Wicklow
- Ulster:
  - County Armagh
  - County Cavan
  - County Donegal
  - County Fermanagh
  - County Londonderry
  - County Monaghan
  - County Tyrone

As appears from the above list: -

1. No county in the province of Ulster sent members. 2. The only borough in Ulster which sent members was Carrickfergus. 3. The province of Connacht constituted a single large county, which did not send members. 4. The only boroughs in Connacht which sent members were Athenry and Galway. 5. The only counties in Munster which sent members were Tipperary and Waterford, the two easternmost counties.

As appears from the above list, the House of Commons contained the following serving members of the administration: -

1. John Challoner, Secretary of State (Ireland).

2. Sir William FitzWilliam, Vice-Treasurer of Ireland.

It also contained the following former members of the administration: -

1. John Alan, Lord Chancellor of Ireland, 1548–1551.

2. Thomas Cusack, Lord Chancellor of Ireland, 1551–1554.

The following officials sat in the House of Lords: -

1. Thomas Butler, 10th Earl of Ormond, Lord Treasurer of Ireland.

2. Archbishop Hugh Curwen, Lord Chancellor of Ireland.
