= Thomas Meredith (disambiguation) =

Thomas Meredith (1777–1819) was an Anglo-Irish Anglican clergyman.

Thomas Meredith or Meredyth may also refer to:

- Sir Thomas Meredyth (Old Leighlin MP) (died 1677), Irish barrister and member of parliament
- Thomas Meredith (Kent MP) (died 1701), English Whig politician
- Thomas Meredyth (British Army officer) (died 1719), British Army general and member of parliament for Navan, Lismore and Midhurst, grandson of Sir Thomas Meredyth
- Thomas Meredyth (politician, died 1732) (c. 1680–1732), Irish member of parliament for Wexford, New Ross and Navan, grandson of Sir Thomas Meredyth
- Thomas Meredith (Baptist leader) (1795–1850), American Baptist leader
- Thomas Graves Meredith (1853–1945), Canadian lawyer and businessman
- Thomas Meredith (archdeacon of Singapore), Welsh Anglican priest, Archdeacon of Singapore, 1890–1892
