= Henry Meredyth =

Henry Meredyth may refer to:

- Henry Meredyth (died 1715), Irish Member of Parliament for Kells and Navan
- Henry Meredyth (died 1789), Irish Member of Parliament for the borough of Armagh
- three of the Meredyth baronets were named Henry
