= Arthur Meredyth =

Arthur Meredyth may refer to:

- Arthur Meredyth (died 1732), member of parliament (MP) for Navan
- Arthur Francis Meredyth (1726–1775), MP for County Meath
