= Sir Patrick Barnewall, 3rd Baronet =

Irish Jacobite politician and baronet

Sir Patrick Barnewall, 3rd Baronet (c.1630 – after 1695) was an Irish Jacobite politician and baronet.

Barnewall was the son of Sir Richard Barnewall, 2nd Baronet and Julia Lettice Aylmer, and on 6 July 1679 he succeeded to his father's baronetcy. He is recorded as being granted a pension of £150 per year from Charles II of England. Barnewall was the Member of Parliament for County Meath in the Irish House of Commons in the Patriot Parliament of 1689. That year he received a grant of 1,261 acres of land in County Galway in recognition of his adherence to James II of England.

He married Frances, youngest daughter of Richard Butler of Kilcash, with whom he had five children. Barnewall was succeeded in his title by his son, George.

Parliament of Ireland
Preceded by Sir Robert Forth; Sir Theophilus Jones	Member of Parliament for County Meath; 1689; With: Sir William Talbot, Bt	Succeeded by Charles Meredyth; John Osborne
Baronetage of Nova Scotia
Preceded by Richard Barnewall	Baronet (of Crickstown Castle); 1679-c.1695	Succeeded by George Barnewall
