= Earl of Lanesborough =

Title in the Peerage of Ireland

Earl of Lanesborough was a title in the Peerage of Ireland. It was created in 1756 for Humphrey Butler, 2nd Viscount Lanesborough. The Butler family descended from Theophilus Butler, who represented County Cavan and Belturbet in the Irish House of Commons. In 1715 he was raised to the Peerage of Ireland as Baron Newtown-Butler, of the County of Fermanagh, with remainder to the heirs male of his father. He was succeeded according to the special remainder by his brother, Brinsley, the second Baron. He had previously represented Kells and Belturbet in the Irish Parliament. In 1728 he was created Viscount Lanesborough in the Peerage of Ireland. He was succeeded by his son, Humphrey, the aforementioned second Viscount, who was elevated to an earldom in 1756. The first Earl was succeeded by his son, Brinsley, the second Earl. He represented County Cavan in the Irish House of Commons. His grandson, the fifth Earl, sat in the British House of Lords as an Irish representative peer from 1849 to 1866. The latter was succeeded by his nephew, the sixth Earl. He served as Lord-Lieutenant of Cavan from 1876 to 1900 and was an Irish Representative Peer from 1870 to 1905. He was succeeded by his son, the seventh Earl. He was an Irish Representative Peer from 1913 to 1929. On his death the titles passed to his younger brother, the eighth Earl. The titles became extinct on the death of the latter's eldest son, the ninth Earl, in December 1998.

The Honourable John Butler, younger son of the first Viscount, was a member of the Irish Parliament for Newcastle between 1743 and 1783.

== Butler family ==
The Butler family trace their lineage back to county of Huntingdon and George Butler who resided at Fen Drayton in 1575 who had six sons one son Stephen Butler who settled in Belturbet County of Cavan in Ireland. Stephen Butler's son Theophilus Butler was created Baron of Newtown-Butler and began family descent.

== Barons Newtown-Butler (1715) ==
- Theophilus Butler, 1st Baron Newtown-Butler (c. 1669 – 1723)
- Brinsley Butler, 2nd Baron Newtown-Butler (1670–1735) (created Viscount Lanesborough in 1728)

=== Viscounts Lanesborough (1728) ===
- Brinsley Butler, 1st Viscount Lanesborough (1670–1735)
- Humphrey Butler, 2nd Viscount Lanesborough (c. 1700–1768) (created Earl of Lanesborough in 1756)

=== Earls of Lanesborough (1756) ===
- Humphrey Butler, 1st Earl of Lanesborough (c. 1700–1768)
- Brinsley Butler, 2nd Earl of Lanesborough (1728–1779)
- Robert Herbert Butler, 3rd Earl of Lanesborough (1759–1806)
- Brinsley Butler, 4th Earl of Lanesborough (1783–1847)
- George John Danvers Butler-Danvers, 5th Earl of Lanesborough (1794–1866)
- John Vansittart Danvers Butler, 6th Earl of Lanesborough (1839–1905)
- Charles John Brinsley Butler, 7th Earl of Lanesborough (1865–1929)
  - John Butler, Lord Newton-Butler (1893–1912)
- Henry Cavendish Butler, 8th Earl of Lanesborough (1868–1950)
- Denis Anthony Brian Butler, 9th Earl of Lanesborough (1918–1998)

=== Title succession chart ===
Title succession chart, Barons Newtown-Butler, Viscounts Lanesborough, and Earls of Lanesborough.

Francis Butler (died 1702)
Baron Newtown-Butler | Viscount Lanesborough
Theophilus Butler; 1st Baron Newtown-Butler c. 1669 – 1724 | Brinsley Butler; 1st Viscount Lanesborough; 2nd Baron Newtown-Butler; 1670–1735
Earl of Lanesborough
Humphrey Butler; 1st Earl of Lanesborough; 2nd Viscount Lanesborough c. 1700 – 1768
Brinsley Butler; 2nd Earl of Lanesborough; 1728–1779
Robert Butler; 3rd Earl of Lanesborough; 1759–1806 | Hon. Augustus Butler-Danvers; 1776–1820
Brinsley Butler; 4th Earl of Lanesborough; 1783–1847 | Hon. David Butler | George Butler-Danvers; 5th Earl of Lanesborough; 1794–1866 | George Butler-Danvers; 1798–? | Lt. William Butler-Danvers; 1803–1838 | Augustus Butler-Danvers; 1807–? | Charles Butler-Danvers; 1808–? | Capt. Hon. Charles Butler-Danvers; 1809–1849 | Hon. Henry Butler-Danvers; 1811–1891
John Butler; 6th Earl of Lanesborough; 1839–1905 | Hon. Charles Butler-Danvers; 1844–1879 | Maj. Henry Butler-Danvers; 1884–1966
Charles Butler; 7th Earl of Lanesborough; 1865–1929 | Henry Butler; 8th Earl of Lanesborough; 1868–1950 | Capt. Hon. Francis Butler; 1872–1925 | 2 Lt. Hon. Brian Butler; 1876–1916 | Lt.Col. Henry Butler-Danvers; 1909–19?? | Lt. Anthony Butler-Danvers; 1916–1943
John Butler; Lord Newton-Butler; 1893–1912 | Denis Butler; 9th Earl of Lanesborough; 10th Viscount Lanesborough; 11th Baron Newtown-Butler; 1918–1998 | Capt. Hon. Patrick Butler; 1920–1944 | Terence Butler; 1913–? | Timothy Butler-Danvers; 1942–1951
All titles extinct

== Arms ==
Coat of arms of Earl of Lanesborough

Coronet
A Coronet of an Earl
Crest
1st: A Wyvern with wings elevated and tail nowed Or the dexter paw supporting a Shield Argent thereon a Bend Gules charged with three Martlets Gold (Danvers); 2nd: A Demi Cockatrice couped Vert wings elevated Argent combed beaked wattled and ducally gorged Or (Butler)
Escutcheon
Quarterly: 1st and 4th, Gules a Chevron wavy between three Mullets of six points radiant Or pierced Azure (Danvers); 2nd and 3rd, Argent three Covered Cups in bend between two Bendlets engrailed Sable (Butler)
Supporters
On the dexter side a Cockatrice Vert with wings elevated Argent combed beaked wattled and ducally gorged Or, and on the sinister side a Wyvern Vert gorged with a Plain Collar and chained Or
Motto
Liberte Tout Entiere (Liberty entire)

== See also ==
- Swithland Hall
- Swithland
- Newtownbutler
- Lanesborough-Ballyleague
- Carter-Campbell of Possil
- Viscount Lanesborough
- The Lanesborough, formerly Lanesborough House, the London home of the Viscounts Lanesborough
