= Baron Athlumney =

Dormant or extinct title in the Peerage of Ireland

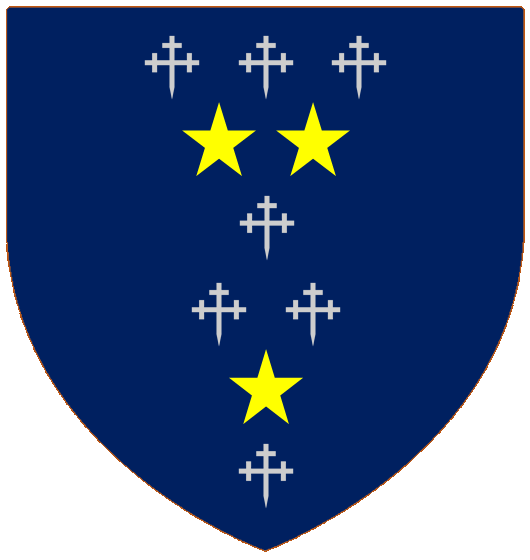
Shield of arms of William Somerville, 1st Baron Athlumney

Baron Athlumney, of Somerville and Dollarstown in the County of Meath, was a title in the Peerage of Ireland. It was created in 1863 for the Liberal politician Sir William Meredyth Somerville, 5th Baronet, who had previously served as Chief Secretary for Ireland. In 1866 he was also created Baron Meredyth, of Dollardstown in the County of Meath, in the Peerage of the United Kingdom. He was succeeded by his eldest and only surviving son from his second marriage, the second Baron. He was childless and on his death in 1929 the baronies became extinct while the baronetcy became dormant.

The Baronetcy, of Somerville in the County of Meath, was created in the Baronetage of Ireland in 1748 for James Somerville, who had earlier served as Lord Mayor of Dublin. His great-grandson, the fourth Baronet (the title having descended from father to son), represented County Meath in both the Irish and British Parliaments. He married Mary Anne, daughter of Sir Richard Gorges-Meredyth, 1st and last Baronet. He was succeeded by his son, the aforementioned fifth Baronet, who was elevated to the peerage in 1863.

== Somerville Baronets, of Somerville (1748) ==
- Sir James Somerville, 1st Baronet (died 1748)
- Sir Quaile Somerville, 2nd Baronet (1714–1772)
- Sir James Quaile Somerville, 3rd Baronet (c. 1742–c. 1800)
- Sir Marcus Somerville, 4th Baronet (c. 1775–1831)
- Sir William Meredyth Somerville, 5th Baronet (1802–1873) (created Baron Athlumney in 1863 and Baron Meredyth in 1866)

== Barons Athlumney (1863) ==
- William Meredyth Somerville, 1st Baron Athlumney (1802–1873)
- James Herbert Gustavus Meredyth Somerville, 2nd Baron Athlumney (1865–1929)
