= Sir John Coghill, 1st Baronet of Coghill =

Sir John Coghill, 1st Baronet (14 July 1732 – 8 March 1790), known before 1775 as John Cramer, was an Anglo-Irish politician.

== Biography ==
Born John Cramer, he was the son of Balthazar John Cramer and Hon. Judith Butler, daughter of Brinsley Butler, 1st Viscount Lanesborough. He was the grandson of Oliver Cramer and his wife Hester, sister of Marmaduke Coghill, Chancellor of the Exchequer of Ireland. In 1775 he succeeded to the Coghill estates on the death of his cousin, Hester, daughter and heiress of James Coghill and widow of Charles Moore, 1st Earl of Charleville. The same year he assumed by Royal licence the surname of Coghill in lieu of Cramer.

Between 1755 and 1760 he represented Belturbet in the Irish House of Commons. He again represented the seat from 1761 to 1776. In 1778 he was created a baronet, of Coghill in the Baronetage of Great Britain. He was succeeded in his title by his eldest son, also called John.

Parliament of Ireland
Preceded by Thomas Butler; Robert Butler	Member of Parliament for Belturbet; 1755–1776; With: Robert Butler (1755–1763); Edward Tighe (1763–1768); George Glover (1768–1771); Robert Birch (1771–1776)	Succeeded by Charles Francis Sheridan; Robert Birch
Baronetage of Great Britain
New creation	Baronet (of Coghill); 1778–1790	Succeeded by John Coghill
