= Denis Butler, 9th Earl of Lanesborough =

Anglo-Irish soldier and peer (1918–1998)

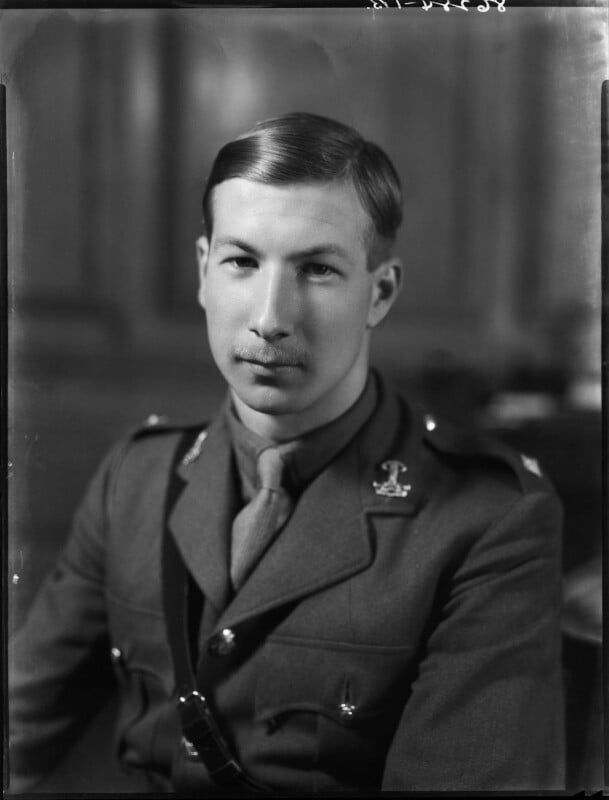
Butler in 1939

Major Denis Anthony Brian Butler, 9th Earl of Lanesborough (28 October 1918 – 21 December 1998), was an Anglo-Irish soldier, landowner and peer, as Earl of Lanesborough from 1950. He was also 10th Viscount Lanesborough and 11th Baron Newtown-Butler.

== Life ==
At the time of Lanesborough's birth, the family's Irish seat was Lanesborough Lodge, located on the Lanesborough estate at Quivvy, a townland just outside Belturbet, in County Cavan. The lodge and demesne were located on a small peninsula on the shores of Upper Lough Erne, directly opposite County Fermanagh. Lanesborough Lodge was burned to the ground in the early 1920s, and the Butler family sold the estate shortly afterwards.

The young Lanesborough was educated at Stowe School.

He was commissioned into the Leicestershire Yeomanry and saw active service in the Second World War, rising to the rank of major.

In 1950, Lanesborough inherited from his father, the 8th Earl, Swithland Hall, Leicestershire and an estate of 3,000 acres (1,200 ha). However, the death duties owed on the inheritance resulted in the sale of most of the estate.

He was appointed as a Justice of the Peace for Leicestershire and in 1962 as a Deputy Lieutenant of the county.

Lord Lanesborough's hobby was a 600-foot model railway, a replica of the Fort William-to-Carlisle line, with 300 pieces of rolling stock which had to be dismantled and sold to help pay death duties. Lanesborough eventually applied to British Rail for employment driving trains, which was declined. Instead he got a job selling cars at a Leicester garage. After the death of his mother, The Dowager Countess of Lanesborough, he sold Swithland Hall and moved to Kegworth Lodge before health reasons resulted in his moving to Scotland.

== Personal life ==
On 20 December 1939, as Lord Newtown-Butler, Lanesborough married Bettyne Ione Everard, a daughter of Sir William Lindsay Everard, and they had two daughters: Georgina Ione Butler (15 August 1941 – 28 December 1947) and Lady Denyne Butler (born 23 February 1945). In 1950, Lanesborough divorced his first wife, and in 1951 he organised a ball for the Canadian actress Yvonne de Carlo. In 1995, he married Patricia Julia Meston, daughter of F. W. Meston M.C., who had been his secretary for forty-five years.

Lanesborough died on 27 December 1998 and his wife Patrica, Countess of Lanesborough, died on 5 March 2015.

== Arms ==
Coat of arms of Denis Butler, 9th Earl of Lanesborough

Coronet
A Coronet of an Earl
Crest
1st: A Wyvern with wings elevated and tail nowed Or the dexter paw supporting a Shield Argent thereon a Bend Gules charged with three Martlets Gold (Danvers); 2nd: A Demi Cockatrice couped Vert wings elevated Argent combed beaked wattled and ducally gorged Or (Butler)
Escutcheon
Quarterly: 1st and 4th, Gules a Chevron wavy between three Mullets of six points radiant Or pierced Azure (Danvers); 2nd and 3rd, Argent three Covered Cups in bend between two Bendlets engrailed Sable (Butler)
Supporters
On the dexter side a Cockatrice Vert with wings elevated Argent combed beaked wattled and ducally gorged Or, and on the sinister side a Wyvern Vert gorged with a Plain Collar and chained Or
Motto
Liberte Tout Entiere (Liberty entire)
