= Robert Meredyth =

Irish politician and lawyer

Sir Robert Meredyth (1597 – 17 October 1668) was an Irish politician and lawyer who served as Chancellor of the Exchequer of Ireland.

== Family ==
Meredyth was the son of Bishop Richard Meredith and Sarah Bathow. In 1618 he married Anne, daughter of Sir William Ussher, clerk of the council in Ireland. His eldest son, William, was created a baronet in 1660 and his third son was Sir Charles Meredyth. After Meredyth's father's death, his mother married Adam Loftus, 1st Viscount Loftus. Meredyth's daughter, Alice, married Charles Coote, 2nd Earl of Mountrath.

== Career ==
Meredyth was admitted to Lincoln's Inn in 1611. He sat in the Irish House of Commons for several constituencies, including Boyle, Augher and Athy. In 1625 Meredyth was secretary to Loftus as Lord Chancellor of Ireland. In 1634, Meredyth was appointed Chancellor of the Exchequer of Ireland. On 6 September 1635 he was knighted by Thomas Wentworth, 1st Earl of Strafford. In July 1643 he was arrested alongside Loftus, Sir John Temple and Sir William Parsons for supporting Parliament during the civil war; he was released in 1645. Meredyth retained the position of Chancellor throughout the British Interregnum and following the Stuart Restoration until his death in 1668.

Political offices
Preceded by Henry Holcroft	Chancellor of the Exchequer of Ireland; 1634-1688	Succeeded by Richard Jones
