= William Talbot (Jacobite) =

Irish Jacobite officer at the Siege of Derry (died 1689)

- Esquire of Ballinamony (Castle Talbot)
- Died: 26 June 1689; Derry
- Spouse: Margaret Masterson
- Issue Detail: Roger & others
- Father: Walter Talbot
- Mother: Elinor Esmonde

William Talbot (died 1689) of Ballynamony in County Wexford, also known as Wicked Will, was an Irish Jacobite. He represented Wexford Borough in the Patriot Parliament. He fought for James II during the Williamite War in Ireland at the Siege of Derry where he was wounded and captured. He died of his wounds while a prisoner in the besieged city.

== Birth and origins ==
William was probably born in County Wexford, Ireland, son of Walter Talbot and his wife Elinor Esmonde. His father was esquire of Ballinamony (later called Talbot Castle) near Blackwater, County Wexford. His father was high sheriff of County Wexford in 1649. His father's family was Old English and Catholic, a cadet branch of the Talbots.

His mother was a daughter of William Esmonde, esquire of Johnstown, County Wexford.

== Marriage ==
Talbot married Margaret, daughter of Richard Masterson, esquire of Castletown, County Wexford.

William and Margaret had four sons: Roger, his heir, Gabriel, in holy orders; Richard and James; and two daughters: Mary and Elinor.

== Patriot Parliament ==
Talbot was one of the two MPs elected for Wexford for the Patriot Parliament in 1689. It seems it was this William Talbot who was sent to the Lords to convince them to approve the land settlement act.

== Death in the Williamite War ==
Talbot was appointed Lieutenant Colonel of an infantry regiment of the Irish army during the reign of James II. His appointment probably owed much to his family connections with Tyrconnell, who was appointed Lord Lieutenant of Ireland in 1687. William Talbot was one of several of Tyrconnell's relatives to be given commands.

In 1689 Talbot with his regiment fought in the Siege of Derry. He was wounded and captured by the Williamite garrison during an action at Windmill Hill. George Walker, the governor of the city offered to release him in exchange for a £500 ransom, but this was fiercely opposed by many of the townspeople and Walker was forced to abandon the plan. Shortly afterwards Talbot died of his wounds while still in captivity. The defenders thought he was a nephew of Tyrconnel. Some thought he was a brother or a cousin. He was one of many Jacobite officers who perished during the ultimately unsuccessful siege of Derry.
