= Belturbet (Parliament of Ireland constituency) =

1614-1801 Irish constituency

- Former borough constituency for the Irish House of Commons
- County: County Cavan
- Borough: Belturbet

1614–1801
- Seats: 2
- Replaced by: Disfranchised

Belturbet was a constituency represented in the Irish House of Commons from 1611 to 1800.

In the Patriot Parliament of 1689 summoned by James II, Belturbet was represented with two members.

Between 1725 and 1793 Catholics and those married to Catholics could not vote. It was in the control of the Earl of Lanesborough. The borough was disenfranchised under the terms of the Acts of Union 1800.

== Members of Parliament, 1613–1801 ==
- 1613–1615 Sir Hugh Wirrall and George Grimesditch
- 1634–1635 Sir Arthur Blundell and Sir William Ryves
- 1639–1649 John Borlase, later Lord Justice of Ireland and Richard Ashe (expelled 1642)
- 1661–1666 Stephen Butler (died and replaced 1662 by Francis Butler) and Thomas Warsopp

=== 1689–1801 ===
Election	First MP	Second MP
1689	Sir Edward Tyrrell, 1st Bt	Philip Tuite
1692	Francis Butler	John Warburton
1703	Richard Tighe	Thomas Taylor (Note: Created a baronet in 1704.)
1713	Theophilus Butler	Brinsley Butler
1715	Charles Delafaye	Brinsley Butler
1725	Charles Delafaye	Hon. Humphrey Butler
1727	Thomas Butler	Hon. Humphrey Butler
1736	Thomas Butler	Robert Butler
1755	John Cramer	Robert Butler
1761	John Butler (Note: Also elected for County Down in 1715, for which he chose to sit.)	Robert Butler
1761	John Cramer (Note: Changed surname to Croghill in 1775.)	Robert Butler
1763	John Cramer	Edward Tighe
1768	John Cramer	George Glover
1771	John Cramer	Robert Birch
1776	Charles Francis Sheridan	Robert Birch
1783	Sir Skeffington Smyth, 1st Bt	David La Touche
1790	John McClintock	Maurice Coppinger
1798	Charles King	Thomas Townsend
1800	Blayney Townley Balfour	Thomas Townsend
1801	Disenfranchised	

== Bibliography ==
- O'Hart, John (2007). The Irish and Anglo-Irish Landed Gentry: When Cromwell came to Ireland. Vol. II. Heritage Books. ISBN 978-0-7884-1927-0.
- Leigh Rayment's historical List of Members of the Irish House of Commons. Cites: Johnston-Liik, Edith Mary (2002). The History of the Irish Parliament 1692-1800 (6 volumes). Ulster Historical Foundation.
