= Sir Richard Meredyth, 2nd Baronet =

Sir Richard Meredyth, 2nd Baronet (1657 – October 1743) was an Anglo-Irish politician.

Meredyth was born in Kildare, Ireland, the son of Sir William Meredyth, 1st Baronet and Mary King. In 1665 he succeeded to his father's baronetcy, but he never assumed the title. Between 1703 and 1713, Meredyth was a Member of Parliament for Athy in the Irish House of Commons.

He married Sarah Paul, daughter of Jeffery Paul of County Clare. He died in October 1743 and was buried in St Patrick's Cathedral, Dublin, and was succeeded in his title by his son, Robert.

Parliament of Ireland
Preceded by Maurice Keating; Richard Locke	Member of Parliament for Athy; 1703–1713; With: Maurice Keating	Succeeded by Maurice Keating; John Lyons
Baronetage of Ireland
Preceded by William Meredyth	Baronet (of Greenhills); 1665–1743	Succeeded by Robert Meredyth
