= Glendalough Cathedral =

St. Peter & St. Paul's Cathedral, Glendalough
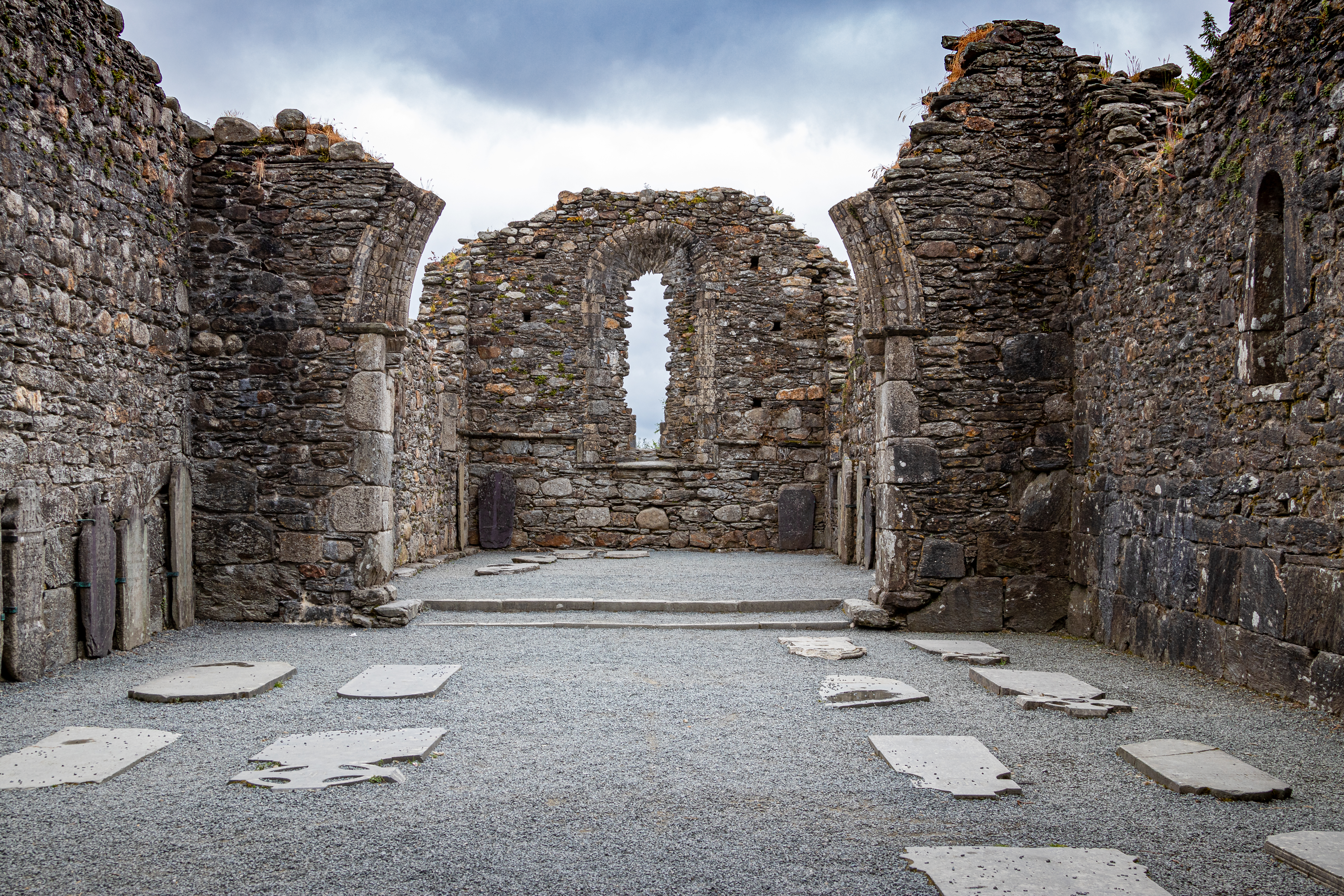
- St. Peter & St. Paul's Cathedral, Glendalough
- 53°00′43″N 6°19′47″W
- Location: Glendalough, County Wicklow
- Country: Ireland
- Denomination: Church of Ireland

Administration
- Province: Province of Dublin
- Diocese: Archdiocese of Dublin

St. Peter and St. Paul's Cathedral, Glendalough is a former cathedral in the Republic of Ireland: it is within the same enclosure as Our Lady's Church and the Round Tower.

Adam Loftus, 1st Viscount Loftus, was appointed Archdeacon of the Cathedral in 1604, and retained the office until his death in 1643, despite objections from the Archbishop of Canterbury.
