= Thomas Cuffe =

Irish politician

Thomas Cuffe was an Irish politician.

Cuffe was born in County Kilkenny and educated at Trinity College Dublin.

Cuffe represented Wexford from 1735 to 1743.
