= Humphrey Butler, 1st Earl of Lanesborough =

Irish politician

Arms of Butler, Earl of Lanesborough: Argent, three covered cups in bend between two bendlets engrailed sable

Humphrey Butler, 1st Earl of Lanesborough (c. 1700 – 11 April 1768) was an Irish politician.

Butler was appointed High Sheriff for County Cavan in 1727 and High Sheriff of Westmeath in 1728. Between 1725 and 1736, he sat as a Member of Parliament (MP) for Belturbet in the Irish House of Commons.

When the Grand Lodge of Ireland was established in c. 1723, he was appointed Deputy Grand Master.

Butler was awarded the honorary degree of LL.D. by Trinity College, Dublin.

He married Mary, the daughter of Richard Berry. He was succeeded by his son, Brinsley, who was also Deputy Grand Master from 1753 to 1756 and elected Grand Master for 1757.

== Arms ==
Coat of arms of Humphrey Butler, 1st Earl of Lanesborough

Coronet
A Coronet of an Earl
Crest
1st: A Wyvern with wings elevated and tail nowed Or the dexter paw supporting a Shield Argent thereon a Bend Gules charged with three Martlets Gold (Danvers); 2nd: A Demi Cockatrice couped Vert wings elevated Argent combed beaked wattled and ducally gorged Or (Butler)
Escutcheon
Quarterly: 1st and 4th, Gules a Chevron wavy between three Mullets of six points radiant Or pierced Azure (Danvers); 2nd and 3rd, Argent three Covered Cups in bend between two Bendlets engrailed Sable (Butler)
Supporters
On the dexter side a Cockatrice Vert with wings elevated Argent combed beaked wattled and ducally gorged Or, and on the sinister side a Wyvern Vert gorged with a Plain Collar and chained Or
Motto
Liberte Tout Entiere (Liberty entire)

Parliament of Ireland
Preceded by Brinsley Butler; Charles Delafaye	Member of Parliament for Belturbet; 1725–1736; With: Charles Delafaye 1725–1727; Thomas Butler 1727–1736	Succeeded by Thomas Butler; Robert Butler
Peerage of Ireland
New creation	Earl of Lanesborough; 1756–1768	Succeeded by Brinsley Butler
Preceded by Brinsley Butler	Viscount Lanesborough; 1735–1768	Succeeded by Brinsley Butler
