= High Sheriff of Meath =

Former representative of the British Crown in County Meath, Ireland

The High Sheriff of Meath was the British Crown's judicial representative in County Meath, Ireland, from the conquest until 1922, when the office was abolished in the new Free State and replaced by the office of Meath County Sheriff.

The sheriff had judicial, electoral, ceremonial and administrative functions and executed high court writs. In 1908, an Order in Council made the Lord-Lieutenant the Sovereign's prime representative in a county and reduced the High Sheriff's precedence. However, the sheriff retained his responsibilities for the preservation of law and order in the county. The usual procedure for appointing the sheriff from 1660 onwards was that three persons were nominated at the beginning of each year from the county and the Lord Lieutenant then appointed his choice as High Sheriff for the remainder of the year. Often the other nominees were appointed as under-sheriffs.

Sometimes a sheriff did not fulfil his entire term through death or other event and another sheriff was then appointed for the remainder of the year. The dates given hereunder are the dates of appointment. All addresses are in County Meath unless stated otherwise.

== High Sheriffs of County Meath ==
- 1299 Rythery Fitzjohn
- 1340: Michael Stokes
- 1345: Roger Dardis or Dardiz
- 1346: Sir Walter de la Hyde (murdered that year?)
- 1368: John FitzRichard
- 1373: William Dalton (killed by the Cenal-Fiachaidh)
- 1384 Walter Chaumbre
- 1385: Richard Drake of Drakerath
- 1386: John Darcy
- 1401: Sir William Nugent of Balrath
- 1403: Sir Christopher Plunket
- 1404: Sir John D'Arcy
- 1405: Sir William Nugent of Balrath, second term
- 1406: Matthew Hussey of Moyle-Hussey
- 1408: Matthew Hussey of Moyle-Hussey, second term
- 1409: Sir Christopher Plunket, second term
- 1415: Sir John D'Arcy
- 1422 John Drake
- 1424: Richard Nugent, 2nd Baron Delvin
- 1425: Sir Christopher Plunket, third term
- 1435: John Barnewall
- 1451: Nicholas Ford of Fordstown
- 1470: Robert Bold, Baron Ratoath
- 1472: James Fleming, 7th Baron Slane
- 1482 Alexander Plunket

== Henry VIII 1509–1547 ==
- 1510: Christopher Cusack of Gerardstown
- 1520–1521: Nicholas Hussey, 10th Baron Galtrim
- 1542: James Everard
- 1543: Sir Thomas Cusack, Lord Chancellor of Ireland

== Elizabeth I, 1558–1603 ==
- 1598: Richard Brett

== James I, 1603–1625 ==
- 1610: Patrick Barnewall of Trim
- 1613: Patrick Barnewall of Trim
- 1622: Patrick Barnewall of Trim

== Charles I, 1625–1649 ==
- 1627 Patrick Segrave

== Commonwealth, 1649–1660 ==
- 1658: William Cadogan

== Charles II, 1660–1685 ==
- 1661: Hercules Langford
- 1667: Richard Janns of Blackcastle
- 1669: Henry Wade of Clonabreany
- 1670: George Pepper of Ballygarth
- 1671: James Naper
- 1677: Sir Hercules Langford, 1st Baronet
- 1678: Charles Meredyth
- 1679: Arthur Meredyth
- 1682: Arthur Meredyth

== James II, 1685–1688 ==
- 1686: Launcelot Dowdall of Mounttown
- 1686: Donogh Mac Gillicuddy.
- 1688: John Browne.

== William III, 1689–1702 ==
- 1690: Sir Henry Langford, 3rd Baronet
- 1698: Joseph Pratt
- 1700: Henry Cadogan
- 1702: James Naper of Loughcrew

== George I, 1714–1727 ==
- 1720: Robert Waller
- 1724: George Pepper of Ballygarth
- 1725: John Coddington

== George II, 1727–1760 ==
- 1727:
- 1728:
- 1729:
- 1730: James Garstin of Leragh Castle
- 1731:
- 1732:
- 1733: Benjamin Chapman of St Lucy's, County Westmeath
- 1734: Richard Wesley, 1st Baron Mornington
- 1735: Christopher Nicholson of Balrath Burry
- 1736:
- 1737: Clotworthy Sheilds Wade of Clonebrayney
- 1738: Hercules Langford Rowley of Summerhill House
- 1739:
- 1740: James Lenox Naper of Loughcrew
- 1741:
- 1742: James Fleming
- 1743: Sir Quaile Somerville, 2nd Baronet
- 1744:
- 1745:
- 1746:
- 1747:
- 1748: John Wade
- 1749:
- 1750: William Waller of Allenstown House
- 1751:
- 1752:
- 1753: John Graham
- 1754: Dixie Coddington of Oldbridge
- 1755:
- 1756:
- 1757:
- 1758:
- 1759:

== George III, 1760–1820 ==
- 1760:
- 1766: Richard Hamilton, 4th Viscount Boyne
- 1767:
- 1770: Hamilton Gorges of Kilbrew
- 1772: Robert Wade of Clonebraney
- 1774: Gustavus Hamilton, 5th Viscount Boyne
- 1775:
- 1778: Samuel Winter of Agher
- 1779:
- 1781: Michael Tisdall (1755–1794) of Charles Fort near Kells
- 1782: Thomas Ash of Ashfield
- 1783: Sir John Meredyth, 1st Baronet, Kt of Carlandstown
- 1784: Richard Chaloner of King's Fort
- 1785: Henry Coddington
- 1786: Thomas Taylour, Marquess of Headfort
- 1787:
- 1788: Michael Tisdall of Charlesfort
- 1789:
- 1791: Christopher Armytage Nicholson of Balrath Burry
- 1792:
- 1794: Thomas Rothwell of Rockfield
- 1795: Thomas Everard
- 1796: Hon. Clotworthy Taylour, later Rowley (cr. Baron Langford of Summerhill, County Meath in 1800; Surname legally changed to Rowley, 26 April 1796)
- 1798: Nicholas Coddington
- 1800: Charles Drake Dillon
- 1802: Thomas Pepper of Ballygarth Castle
- 1803: James O'Reilly of Baltrasna
- 1804: William Battersby
- 1805: Thomas Taylor Rowley
- 1806: John Pratt Winter of Agher
- 1807: Thomas Barnes
- 1808: Henry Woodward
- 1809: Arthur Hill Cornwallis Pollock of Mountainstown
- 1810: Claudius Cole Hamilton
- 1811: Charles Arthur Tisdall of Charlesfort
- 1812: William Blaney Wade
- 1813: George Pepper of Ballygarth Castle
- 1814: Caleb Barnes
- 1815: Thomas Lowther Allen
- 1816: James Somerville
- 1817: Ferdinand Meath M'Veagh
- 1818: John Gerrard
- 1819: Henry Jeremiah Smith
- 1820: William Henry Waller

== George IV, 1820–1830 ==
- 1821: John Payne Garnett of Arch Hall, Navan
- 1822: James Lenox William Naper of Loughcrew
- 1823: Francis Singleton
- 1824: John Charles Preston, of Swainstown
- 1825: John Thompson, of Rathnally, Trim
- 1827: John Armytage Nicholson of Balrath Burry, Kells
- 1828: Robert George Bomford and Richard Bolton
- 1829: Anthony Blackburne of Parsonstown

== William IV, 1830–1837 ==
- 1831: The Honourable Edward Anthony John Preston of Gormanston Castle, Balbriggan
- 1832: Robert George Bomford
- 1834: Hon. Randle E. Plunket of Dunsany Castle, Dunshaughlin
- 1836: Henry Meredyth, later Sir Henry Meredyth, 4th Baronet of North Dublin
- 1837: Samuel Winter of Agher

== Victoria, 1837–1901 ==
- 1838:
- 1839: Richard Rothwell, of Rockfield
- 1840: Robert Craven Wade of Clonebraney
- 1841: John Tisdall of Charlesfort
- 1842: Henry Corbet Singleton of Aclare
- 1843: Henry Barry Coddington of Oldbridge
- 1843: John Farrell of Moynalty
- 1844: Thomas Taylour, 3rd Marquess of Headfort of Headfort House, Kells
- 1845: Lord Killeen, of Killeen Castle
- 1846: George Annesley Pollock of Oatlands
- 1847:
- 1848: Henry Barry Coddington of Old Bridge, Drogheda
- 1849: William Martley Blackburne, of Tankardstown-Hall, Slane
- 1850: Michael Thunder of Lagore, Dunshaughlin
- 1851: Hans Hamilton Woods of Whitestown House
- 1852: Edward Rotheram of Crossdrum
- 1853: James Lenox Naper of Loughcrew
- 1854: John Osborne George Pollock of Mountainstown
- 1855: Richard Chaloner of King's Fort
- 1856: Christopher A. Nicholson of Belrath, Kells
- 1857: John Arthur Farrell of Moynalty
- 1858: Samuel Garnett of Arch Hall, Navan
- 1859: Hercules Langford Boyle Rowley of Marlay Grange, County Dublin
- 1860: George Bomford of Oakley Park
- 1861:
- 1862: Thomas Boylan, Hilltown, Drogheda.
- 1863: Thomas Gerrard of Gibbstown and Boyne Hill.
- 1864: William Stawell Garnett of Williamston.
- 1865:
- 1867: Thomas Rockwell of Rockfield.
- 1868:
- 1870: The Hon Jenico W. J. Preston of Gormanstown Castle, Balbriggan.
- 1871: Robert Fowler
- 1872: James Sanderson Winter of Agher.
- 1873: Robert Caddell of Harbourstown.
- 1874:
- 1875: Mervyn Pratt.
- 1876:
- 1877: Henry Corbet Singleton of Aclare.
- 1878: George Augustus Rotheram of Kilbride Castle, Trim.
- 1879:
- 1880: William Newcombe Waller of Allenstown.
- 1881: John Kearney
- 1882: Robert Grimshaw Dunville
- 1883: Nugent Talbot Everard, Bt
- 1884: John Naper George Pollock of Mountainstown.
- 1885: Edward Rotheram of Crossdrum.
- 1886:
- 1887: Charles Pepper of Ballygarth Castle.
- 1888: Edward Hamilton Woods of Milverton Hall, County Dublin.
- 1889: Nathaniel Hone Dyas of Athboy House & Staholmack, County Meath.
- 1890:
- 1891: George Joseph Brooke McVeagh of Drewstown, Kells.
- 1892: Robert Bernard George Ashurst Gradwell
- 1893: Uvedale Corbet Singleton of Aclare.
- 1894: Thomas Boylan
- 1895: John Hampden Nicholson of Balrath Burry.
- 1896: William Thompson of Rathnally.
- 1897: Gustavus Villiers Briscoe of Bellinter House.
- 1898: Francis William Blackburne of Tankardstown.
- 1899: Robert Henry Fowler of Rahinston and Rathmolyon.
- 1900:
- 1901: Gustavus Francis William Lambart, 1st Baronet of Beau Parc.

== Edward VII, 1901–1910 ==
- 1902: Charles Henry Bulwer Caldwell of New Grange.
- 1904: Frederick Arthur Bligh of Brittas, Nobber.
- 1905: Fitzhenry Augustus Smith of Annesbrook, Duleek.
- 1906: Edward Rotheram of Crossdrum.
- 1907: John Edward Joseph Farrell of Moynalty.
- 1908: George Fitzgerald Murphy of the Grange, Dunsany.

== George V, 1910–1936 ==
- 1910: Patrick James Kennedy of Rathcore House, Enfield.
- 1911: William Lennox Naper of Loughcrew.
- 1912: Reginald Dashwood Tandy.
- 1913: John Francis Hevey Langan.
- 1922: Arthur Francis Coddington.
