= James Naper =

English cricketer and British Army officer

Personal information
- Full name: James Lenox Naper
- Born: 5 December 1825; Wellesbourne, Warwickshire, England
- Died: 4 December 1901 (aged 75); Dublin, Ireland
- Batting: Unknown

Domestic team information
- Years: Team
- 1846: Marylebone Cricket Club

Career statistics
Competition	First-class
Matches	1
Runs scored	16
Batting average	8.00
100s/50s	–/–
Top score	14
Catches/stumpings	1/–
- Source: Cricinfo, 16 October 2021

James Lenox Naper DL JP (5 December 1825 – 4 December 1901) was an Anglo-Irish first-class cricketer, Militia officer and farmer.

The son of the politician James Lenox William Naper, he was born in December 1825 at Wellesbourne, Warwickshire. He was educated at Eton College, before going up to Christ Church, Oxford. Naper played first-class cricket for the Marylebone Cricket Club (MCC) against Oxford University at Oxford in 1846. Batting twice in the match, he was dismissed in the MCC's first innings for 14 runs by William Davies, while in their second innings he was dismissed for 2 runs by Stephen Soames. He was appointed High Sheriff of Meath in January 1853 and later served as Deputy Lieutenant for the county in 1870. He was additionally a justice of the peace for Meath. Naper served with the Royal Meath Militia, being commissioned as a major in December 1854. Naper was a prominent figure in Irish agriculture, breeding prized Hereford cattle and Shropshire sheep. He died suddenly at Dublin in December 1901.
