= Baron Galtrim =

Irish feudal barony

Baron Galtrim was an Irish feudal barony which was hereditary in the Hussey family. The holder of the barony was entitled to style himself Lord Galtrim, but was not entitled as of right to sit in the Irish House of Lords, although at least two holders of the title did receive a summons to sit in Parliament, and a third sat in the House of Commons. The title was created in the late fourteenth century by summons to Parliament.

Use of the title lapsed in the early nineteenth century: from then on the former Lord Galtrim was usually referred to simply as "Mr. Hussey of Rathkenny" in reference to the Hussey family's home in County Meath from the early fifteenth century.

== Early history ==
The title Baron Galtrim was held by the Hussey family, who came to Ireland during the Norman Invasion of 1172 in the entourage of Hugh de Lacy, Lord of Meath, and became substantial landowners in County Meath. The first Irish Hussey whose name is recorded is Sir Hugh Hussey, who married a sister of Theobald Walter, ancestor of the Butler dynasty.

A junior branch of the family settled in County Kerry, where they acquired lands at Dingle and Castlegregory. The senior branch became allied by marriage to many of the other Anglo-Irish families of the Pale in a close-knit "cousinship": down the centuries they married again and again into the same families, especially the Cusacks, the Aylmers, the Barnewalls and the Plunketts. By the end of the thirteenth century, the family was influential enough to clash with the Bishop of Meath about the right of advowson (i.e. their right to appoint the priest to churches in the diocese).

John Hussey, 1st Baron Galtrim, was summoned to the Parliament of Ireland in 1374 with that title. He was already a political figure of some importance: in 1364 the English Crown had appointed him a member of a Royal Commission to investigate complaints of corruption and maladministration by Irish Crown officials. In 1371 it was reported that his lands in County Meath were afflicted with bubonic plague. His brother and heir Edmund was summoned to the Parliament of 1380 as the 2nd Baron Galtrim. Peter, the third Baron, married into the powerful Cusack family of Cushinstown. He had no issue, and the estates passed in the female line through his sister Margaret, who married Robert Oriel, although his heirs adopted the name Hussey. Margaret, who died in 1400, was described as Baroness Galtrim in her own right.

Matthew Hussey, 4th Baron Galtrim, was, like the first Baron, a figure of some political importance, and received several grants of land as compensation for the great costs he had incurred in fighting "the King's enemies" both in Meath and "elsewhere in Ireland". He was entrusted with tasks of a quasi-judicial nature, and in 1410 sat with the Chief Justices of the courts of common law on a judicial commission to inquire into all treasons committed in County Meath. He married Margaret Pettit, the heiress of Rathkenny, and died in 1418. He is buried in The Black Friary, Trim, of which he was a noted benefactor.

Thomas Hussey, 5th Baron Galtrim, who was Matthew's eldest son and Edmund's great-grandson, was reportedly murdered on his wedding day: this inspired a nineteenth-century ballad by Gerald Griffin, "The Bride of Malahide". (The bride was Maud Plunkett, daughter of Christopher Plunkett, 1st Baron Killeen: she remarried firstly Richard Talbot of Malahide Castle and secondly John Cornwalsh, and died in 1482. She was said to be a lady of ferocious temper). In 1493 Elizabeth Barnewall, daughter of Sir Christopher Barnewall of Crickstown, and widow of Nicholas, 6th Baron Galtrim, had her dower rights confirmed by a statute of the Irish Parliament.

Nicholas Hussey, 10th Baron Galtrim, was High Sheriff of Meath in 1520–1521. In 1509 he was granted seisin of the lands of his father Patrick Hussey, 9th Baron Galtrim, lately deceased. Nicholas's son Patrick, the 11th Baron, married Catherine Barnewall, and was the son-in-law of the powerful statesman and judge John Barnewall, 3rd Baron Trimlestown, who was Lord Chancellor of Ireland in the 1530s. Patrick, the 13th Baron, was a politician of some importance in the seventeenth century, who sat in the Irish House of Commons as MP for County Meath in the Parliaments of 1613-14 and 1634–35.

== The Hussey family under the Penal Laws, and afterwards ==
While the Kerry branch of the family lost most of their lands during the English Civil War in the 1640s, the Galtrim Husseys seem to have escaped serious persecution, although the family openly professed the Roman Catholic faith, even at the height of the Penal Laws. From a 1775 lawsuit in which Stafford Hussey, 17th Baron Galtrim, was the defendant, it appears that they employed a complex set of legal devices to overcome the various restrictions on Roman Catholics owning land. While Stafford openly described himself as a Papist his eldest son John seems to have been a "Church Papist" i.e. he conformed outwardly to the Church of Ireland, while strongly supporting the cause of equal rights for Catholics. Stafford died at a considerable age in 1776, and was buried in Rathkenny Church beside his wife Mary Anne Kirwan, who had died in 1774. The inscription on their tomb describes Stafford as a man who "lived respected and died regretted"; Mary Anne was described as a "tender parent and true friend to the poor".

Their younger son Thomas, who inherited the title on the death of his brother John in 1803, married Lady Maria Walpole, daughter of Horatio Walpole, 1st Earl of Orford and Lady Rachel Cavendish, in 1777. Since it began with an elopement, it may well be that her parents disapproved of the marriage. Like his father, he was an open Roman Catholic and a staunch supporter of Catholic Emancipation.

== Rathkenny Murder Trial 1833 ==
The title passed to Thomas's son Edward Thomas Hussey, although it is not clear if he ever used it. Edward Thomas became something of a celebrity in 1833 when a number of men, supposedly at the instigation of a disgruntled tenant of Hussey called James Slevin, tried to murder him: Hussey survived the attack but his steward James Bunn and another man were killed. Slevin was charged with the murders but acquitted. His co-accused Michael Devine was convicted.

== Rathkenny House ==
The Hussey family's main residence from the early fifteenth century was at Rathkenny in County Meath. Rathkenny House still exists: the present house was built by Stafford Hussey in about 1750. It was here that four men attempted to murder Stafford's grandson Edward Thomas Hussey in 1833. Algernon Hussey, a grandson of Edward Thomas Hussey, sold Rathkenny House in 1903.

== Earl Beaulieu ==
The statesman Edward Hussey-Montagu, 1st Earl Beaulieu, son of James Hussey, belonged to a junior branch of this family. His only son John predeceased him and his earldom became extinct at his own death in 1802.

== List of Barons of Galtrim from 1374 ==
- John Hussey, 1st Baron Galtrim (died c.1379)
- Edmund Hussey, 2nd Baron Galtrim (died 1384)
- Peter Hussey, 3rd Baron Galtrim (born 1379: he is known to have been five years old when he succeeded to the title)
- Matthew Hussey, 4th Baron Galtrim (died 1418)
- Thomas Hussey, 5th Baron Galtrim (murdered before 1439)
- Nicholas Hussey, 6th Baron Galtrim, brother of the preceding, (living 1450, dead by 1493)
- John Hussey, 7th Baron Galtrim (living 1480)
- Patrick Hussey, 8th Baron Galtrim (died 1509)
- Nicholas Hussey, 10th Baron Galtrim (living 1532)
- Patrick Hussey, 11th Baron Galtrim (1506-1578)
- James Hussey, 12th Baron Galtrim (died 1603)
- Patrick Hussey, 13th Baron Galtrim (1570-c.1636)
- Hugh Hussey, 14th Baron Galtrim (died 1663)
- Matthias Hussey, 15th Baron Galtrim
- James Hussey, 16th Baron Galtrim
- Stafford Hussey, 17th Baron Galtrim (1702-1776)
- John Hussey, 18th Baron Galtrim (died 1803)
- Thomas Hussey, 19th Baron Galtrim (died 1825)

After about 1825 use of the title seems to have lapsed

- Edward Thomas Hussey, 20th Baron Galtrim (1778-1846)
- Edward Horatio Hussey, 21st Baron Galtrim (1807-1876)
- Horatio George Hussey, 22nd Baron Galtrim (1846-1902)

== Sources ==
- Burke's Peerage 4th Edition 1832
- Collins, Arthur Peerage of England 9 Volumes London 1779
- D'Alton, John King James's Irish Army List Dublin 1855
- Loge, John and Archdall, Mervyn Peerage of Ireland Dublin 1789
- Otway-Ruthven, A.J. History of Medieval Ireland Barnes and Noble reissue New York 1993
- Reports of select cases argued and determined in the High Court of Chancery in Ireland
