= Theophilus Butler, 1st Baron Newtown-Butler =

Irish politician and peer

Arms of Butler, Earl of Lanesborough: Argent, three covered cups in bend between two bendlets engrailed sable

Theophilus Butler, 1st Baron Newtown-Butler (1669 – 11 March 1724), was an Irish politician and peer.

Butler was the son of Francis Butler and Judith Jones. He was educated at Trinity College Dublin. He sat in the Irish House of Commons as the Member of Parliament for County Cavan between 1703 and 1713. In 1711, he was made a member of the Privy Council of Ireland. He then represented Belturbet from 1713 to 1714. In 1715, he was raised to the peerage as Baron Newtown-Butler in the Peerage of Ireland, and assumed his seat in the Irish House of Lords. The title was created with special remainder to the heirs male of his father; upon Lord Newtown-Butler dying without children in 1724, the title passed to his younger brother, Brinsley Butler, who was made Viscount Lanesborough in 1728. Theophilus married Emily Stopford, eldest daughter of the Cromwellian officer James Stopford of Newhall, County Meath and his second wife Mary Forth, daughter of Sir Robert Forth.

Parliament of Ireland
Preceded by Sir Francis Hamilton, Bt; Francis White	Member of Parliament for County Cavan; 1703–1713; With: Sir Francis Hamilton, Bt	Succeeded by Sir Francis Hamilton, Bt; Robert Saunderson
Preceded by Richard Tighe; Sir Thomas Taylor, Bt	Member of Parliament for Belturbet; 1713–1714; With: Brinsley Butler	Succeeded by Charles Delafaye; Brinsley Butler
Peerage of Ireland
New creation	Baron Newtown-Butler; 1715–1724	Succeeded by Brinsley Butler
