= Brian Butler (cricketer) =

English cricketer and British Army officer

Personal information
- Full name: Brian Danvers Butler
- Born: 18 April 1876; Swithland, Leicestershire, England
- Died: 18 August 1916 (aged 40); Longueval, Somme, France
- Batting: Right-handed

Domestic team information
- Years: Team
- 1913–1914: Marylebone Cricket Club

Career statistics
Competition	First-class
Matches	2
Runs scored	42
Batting average	10.50
100s/50s	–/–
Top score	29
Catches/stumpings	–/–
- Source: Cricinfo, 23 March 2021

Brian Danvers Butler (18 April 1876 – 18 August 1916) was an English first-class cricketer and British Army officer.

The son of the Earl of Lanesborough and his wife, Anne Elizabeth Clarke, he was born in April 1876 at Swithland Hall in Leicestershire. In the early years of the 20th century, Butler played cricket for Leicestershire Second XI, though he never featured for the first XI. He later moved to East Grinstead in Sussex, where he was a popular figure who played for East Grinstead Cricket Club, in addition to being a keen golfer. A member of the Marylebone Cricket Club since 1909, Butler made two appearances in first-class cricket for the club in 1913 and 1914, playing against Hampshire on both occasions.

Butler served in the British Army during the First World War, being commissioned as a second lieutenant in the King's Royal Rifle Corps in April 1915. He was promoted to the temporary rank of lieutenant in September 1915. Butler fought on the Western Front and was killed in action during the Battle of the Somme on 18 August 1916.
