= Charles Delafaye =

Irish politician (1677–1762)

Charles Delafaye (1677 – 11 December 1762) was Member of the Parliament of Ireland for Belturbet from 1715 to 1727 and Chief Secretary to the Earl of Galway and the Duke of Grafton who held joint Governorship. Delafaye shared that role with Martin Bladen.

He was elected a Fellow of the Royal Society in 1725. He was appointed a Clerk of the Signet from 1728 to 1747.

He died in 1762 at the age of 85 at his home in Wichbury, near Salisbury.

Political offices
Preceded by Joseph Addison	Chief Secretary for Ireland; 1715–1717; With: Martin Bladen	Succeeded by Edward Webster
Parliament of Ireland
Preceded by Theophilus Butler; Brinsley Butler	Member of Parliament for Belturbet; 1715–1727; With: Brinsley Butler; Hon. Humphrey Butler	Succeeded by Thomas Butler; Hon. Humphrey Butler
