= John Lyons (Athy politician) =

Irish politician

John Lyons (c.1667 – 1726 or 1732) was an Irish politician who sat in the Irish House of Commons as the Member of Parliament for Athy from 1713 to 1714.

Parliament of Ireland
Preceded by Maurice Keating; Sir Richard Meredyth, Bt	Member of Parliament for Athy; 1713–1714; With: Maurice Keating	Succeeded by Maurice Keating; Richard Allen
