= Sir William Meredyth, 1st Baronet =

Anglo-Irish Roundhead soldier and politician

Sir William Meredyth, 1st Baronet (c. 1620 – 14 February 1665) was an Anglo-Irish soldier and politician.

== Biography ==
Meredyth was the son of Sir Robert Meredyth, Chancellor of the Exchequer of Ireland, and Anne, daughter of Sir William Ussher, clerk of the council in Ireland.

Meredyth was a major in the New Model Army during the Cromwellian conquest of Ireland. From 1654 to 1655 he represented the counties of Kildare and Wicklow as a Member of Parliament in the First Protectorate Parliament in London. Despite his association with the Commonwealth, following the Stuart Restoration he was created a baronet, of Greenhills in the Baronetage of Ireland, by Charles II of England on 20 November 1660. He was in command of a troop of horse in February 1662. On 17 October 1668 he succeeded to his father's estates.

In November 1655 he married Mary King, daughter of Sir Robert King and sister of John King, 1st Baron Kingston. Upon Meredyth's death in 1665, he was buried in St Patrick's Cathedral, Dublin and succeeded in his title by his eldest surviving son, Richard Meredyth.

Parliament of England
Preceded by Parliament of Ireland	Member of Parliament for Kildare and Wicklow; 1654–1655; With: Anthony Morgan	Succeeded by Sir Hardress Waller; Anthony Morgan
Baronetage of Ireland
New creation	Baronet (of Greenhills); 1660–1665	Succeeded by Richard Meredyth
