= Robert Forth =

Member of the Parliament of Ireland

Sir Robert Forth (c.1600-c.1665) was an Irish statesman of the seventeenth century, and an influential figure in the political crisis of 1640–41. He sat in the Irish House of Commons and was a member of the Privy Council of Ireland. He was again a political figure of some importance in the early 1660s.

He was the eldest son of Sir Ambrose Forth and Anne Cusack, daughter of Edward Cusack of Lismullen, County Meath and Elizabeth Aylmer. His father was an English-born lawyer who came to Ireland in 1573 to serve as the Irish Probate judge, and in 1575 became the first judge of the Irish Court of Admiralty. His mother belonged to the leading Anglo-Irish landowning Cusack family: her grandfather Sir Thomas Cusack had been Lord Chancellor of Ireland. Unlike his father, Robert apparently never became a lawyer, although he may have had some legal training.

He was probably born in Cabra Castle at Kingscourt in County Cavan, where his father had his main residence, which he referred to disparagingly, and quite inaccurately, as a "poor farmhouse". Robert was still living there in 1663. The original Cabra Castle is now a ruin: the present building is nineteenth-century. Ambrose died in 1610; his widow made two further marriages.

Robert came to prominence as one of the leaders of the Irish House of Commons in the critical years 1640–41, which saw the downfall and execution for treason of the formerly all-powerful Lord Lieutenant of Ireland, Thomas Wentworth, 1st Earl of Strafford. Robert, who sat as MP for Kilbeggan, belonged to the "moderate" Protestant party, who were anxious to find common cause with their Roman Catholic colleagues (although Forth persecuted Catholic priests in his later years). He was a supporter of James Butler, 1st Duke of Ormonde, the leader of the Irish Royalists.

The Irish Rebellion of 1641 ruined the hopes of the moderate party: Ormonde went into exile, and Forth apparently retired into private life, residing on his estate at Cabra in County Cavan. He re-entered political life at the Restoration of Charles II: he sat once more in the Irish Parliament, this time as member for County Meath, and was sworn a member of the Irish Privy Council. He was again a figure of some importance in the first few years after the Restoration; he seems to have died sometime in the mid-1660s.

He was still alive in 1663, when he was corresponding with his son in July. In the same year, he received a letter of command from the Duke of Ormonde, now Lord Lieutenant of Ireland. Forth's reply is in the National Archives. Ormonde's commands concern proceedings to be taken against Roman Catholic priests, although he was personally tolerant enough in religious matters. Forth in his reply details proceedings already taken against priests in various parts of Ulster.

He had at least one son, John, and one daughter, Mary, the second wife of the wealthy former Cromwellian army officer James Stopford of Newhall, County Meath. They had two daughters, Emily and Dorothy ("Countess Doll"). Dorothy was a close friend of Jonathan Swift: she married firstly Edward Brabazon, 4th Earl of Meath and secondly General Richard Gorges MP of Kilbrew. Emily married Theophilus Butler, 1st Baron Newtown-Butler.

A letter from John to his father dated 16 July 1663 is now in the National Archives. John, writing from Navan, describes a discovery of stores (possibly weapons?) there, which he believed might be connected with a recent conspiracy against the Crown.

== Sources ==
- Bergin, John "Stopford, James" Cambridge Dictionary of Irish Biography 2009
- Burke's Peerage 107th Edition Delaware 2003
- Costello, Kevin The Court of Admiralty of Ireland 1575-1893 Four Courts Press Dublin 2011
- Perceval-Maxwell, M. The Outbreak of the Irish Rebellion of 1641 McGill-Queens University Press Montreal 1994
