= Navan (Parliament of Ireland constituency) =

Pre-1801 Irish constituency

- Former borough constituency for the Irish House of Commons
- County: County Meath
- Borough: Navan

–1801
- Replaced by: Disfranchised

Navan was a constituency represented in the Irish House of Commons until 1800.

== Members of Parliament ==
- 1560 Patrick Warren and John Wakeley
- 1585 Thomas Warren and Thomas Wakeley
- 1613–1615 John Warren and Patrick Begg of Boranstown
- 1634–1635 Laurence Dowdall of Athlumney and Patrick D'Arcy
- 1639–1642 Patrick Manning and Thomas Nangle, 19th Baron of Navan (both expelled)
- 1642–1649 William Whyte (died and replaced 1643 by Simon Luttrell) and Walter Harding
- 1661–1686 John Preston and Henry Packenham

=== 1689–1801 ===
Election	First MP	Second MP
1689	Christopher Cusack of Corballis	Christopher Cusack of Rathaldran
1692	Arthur Meredyth	Francis Osborne
1703	Arthur Meredyth	Thomas Meredyth
1713	Henry Meredyth	Nathaniel Preston
1715	Arthur Meredyth	Nathaniel Preston
1727	Thomas Meredyth	Nathaniel Preston
1732	John Preston	Nathaniel Preston
1755	John Preston	Nathaniel Preston
1755	Richard Hamilton	Nathaniel Preston
1761	John Preston	Joseph Preston
1768	John Foster	Joseph Preston
1769	John Preston	Joseph Preston
1781	James Pratt	Joseph Preston
1783	John Preston	Joseph Preston
1801	Constituency disenfranchised	
