= Wexford (Parliament of Ireland constituency) =

Pre-1801 Irish constituency

- Former borough constituency for the Irish House of Commons
- County: County Wexford

–1801
- Seats: 2
- Replaced by: Wexford (UKHC)

Wexford was a constituency represented in the Irish House of Commons until its abolition on 1 January 1801.

== Members of Parliament ==
- 1376: James Freynsshe and Laurence Broun were elected to come to England to consult with the king and council about the government of Ireland and about an aid for the king.
- 1560 John Hassane and Richard Talbot
- 1585 Patrick Furlong and Patrick Talbot
- 1613–1615 John Turner and Robert Talbot
- 1634–1635 Patrick Talbot and Richard Cheevers (Cheevers died and replaced by John Furlong)
- 1639–1643 Patrick French (expelled) and John Talbot (expelled) (replaced 1646 by William Sacheverall)
- 1661–1666 Martin Noel and Thomas Hart

=== 1689–1801 ===
Election	First MP	Second MP	
1689	William Talbot	Francis Rooth	
1692	John Fenn	John Pulteney	
1695	John Harvey	Daniel Wybrants	
1703	James Stopford	Cadwallader Edwards	
1713	Richard Saunders	Thomas Meredyth	Tory
1713	Edward Jones	Cadwallader Edwards	
1727	Edward Jones	Henry Hatton	
1735	Edward Jones	Thomas Le Hunte	
1735	Thomas Cuffe	Thomas Le Hunte	
1743	Robert Doyne	Thomas Le Hunte	
1761	Arthur Jones-Nevill	Thomas Le Hunte	
1768	Arthur Jones-Nevill	Richard Le Hunt	
1771	Richard Nevill	Richard Le Hunt	
1783	Richard Nevill	Charles Tottenham Loftus	
1785	Richard Nevill	Francis Leigh	
1798	Richard Nevill	James Boyd	
1800	Richard Nevill	Francis Leigh	
1801	Succeeded by Westminster constituency Wexford		
