= Brinsley Butler, 1st Viscount Lanesborough =

Irish politician and peer

Member of Parliament
- In office 1703–1724

Viscount Lanesborough
- In office 1728–1735

Personal details
- Born: 1670
- Died: 6 March 1735 (aged 64–65)
- Spouse: Catharine Pooley
- Children: 23 (5 survived infancy)
- Occupation: Politician, Peer

Brinsley Butler, 1st Viscount Lanesborough (1670–6 March 1735) was an Irish politician and peer.

Butler was the son of Francis Butler and Judith Jones. He represented Kells in the Irish House of Commons between 1703 and 1713, before sitting for Belturbet from 1713 to 1724. Upon the death of his brother Theophilus Butler on 11 March 1724 he succeeded to his peerage and assumed his seat in the Irish House of Lords. In 1726 was made a member of the Privy Council of Ireland. In 1728 he was created Viscount Lanesborough in the Peerage of Ireland.

He married Catharine Pooley, with whom he had twenty-three children, although only five survived infancy. He was succeeded in his titles by his son, Humphrey Butler, who was made Earl of Lanesborough in 1756.

Parliament of Ireland
Preceded by Charles Meredyth; Sir Thomas Taylor, 1st Bt	Member of Parliament for Kells; 1703–1713; With: Charles Meredyth (1703–1710); Henry Meredyth (1710–1713)	Succeeded by Sir Thomas Taylor, 1st Bt; Sir Thomas Taylor, 2nd Bt
Preceded by Richard Tighe; Sir Thomas Taylor, Bt	Member of Parliament for Belturbet; 1713–1724; With: Theophilus Butler (1713–1715); Charles Delafaye (1715–1724)	Succeeded by Hon. Humphrey Butler; Charles Delafaye
Peerage of Ireland
New creation	Viscount Lanesborough; 1728–1735	Succeeded by Humphrey Butler
Preceded by Theophilus Butler	Baron Newtown-Butler; 1724–1735	Succeeded by Humphrey Butler
