= Charles Meredyth (died 1710) =

Irish politician

Charles Meredyth (died 1710) was an Irish politician.

Meredyth was the eldest son of Thomas Meredyth and Letitia Fortescue, and the grandson of Richard Meredith.

He was a cornet in The Lord General's Regiment of Foot Guards in 1661 and was serving in the Duke of Albemarle's Regiment of Horse in 1662. He was appointed High Sheriff of Meath on 23 November 1678. Meredyth sat in the Irish House of Commons as the Member of Parliament for County Meath from 1692 to 1693. He then represented Kells from 1695 to 1699 and again between 1702 and his death in 1710.

He married firstly Anne Blayney in 1671, with whom he had Henry Meredyth, and married secondly Judith Savage in 1677, with whom he had Thomas Meredyth.

Parliament of Ireland
Preceded by Sir William Talbot, Bt; Sir Patrick Barnewall, Bt	Member of Parliament for County Meath; 1692–1693; With: John Osborne	Succeeded by John Dillon; Thomas Bligh
Preceded by John Dillon; Sir Thomas Taylor, Bt	Member of Parliament for Kells; 1695–1710; With: Sir Thomas Taylor, Bt (1695–1703); Brinsley Butler (1703–1710)	Succeeded by Henry Meredyth; Brinsley Butler
