= Kells Lower =

Kells Lower Ceanannas Íochtarach
- Barony
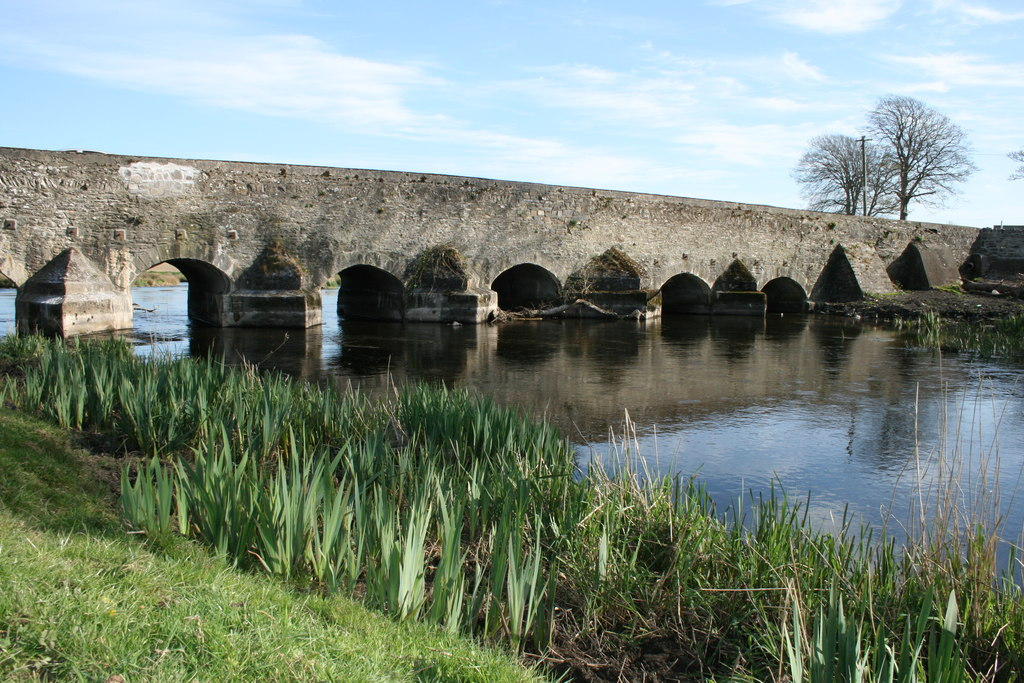
- Bridge carrying the R164 over the Blackwater at Moynalty

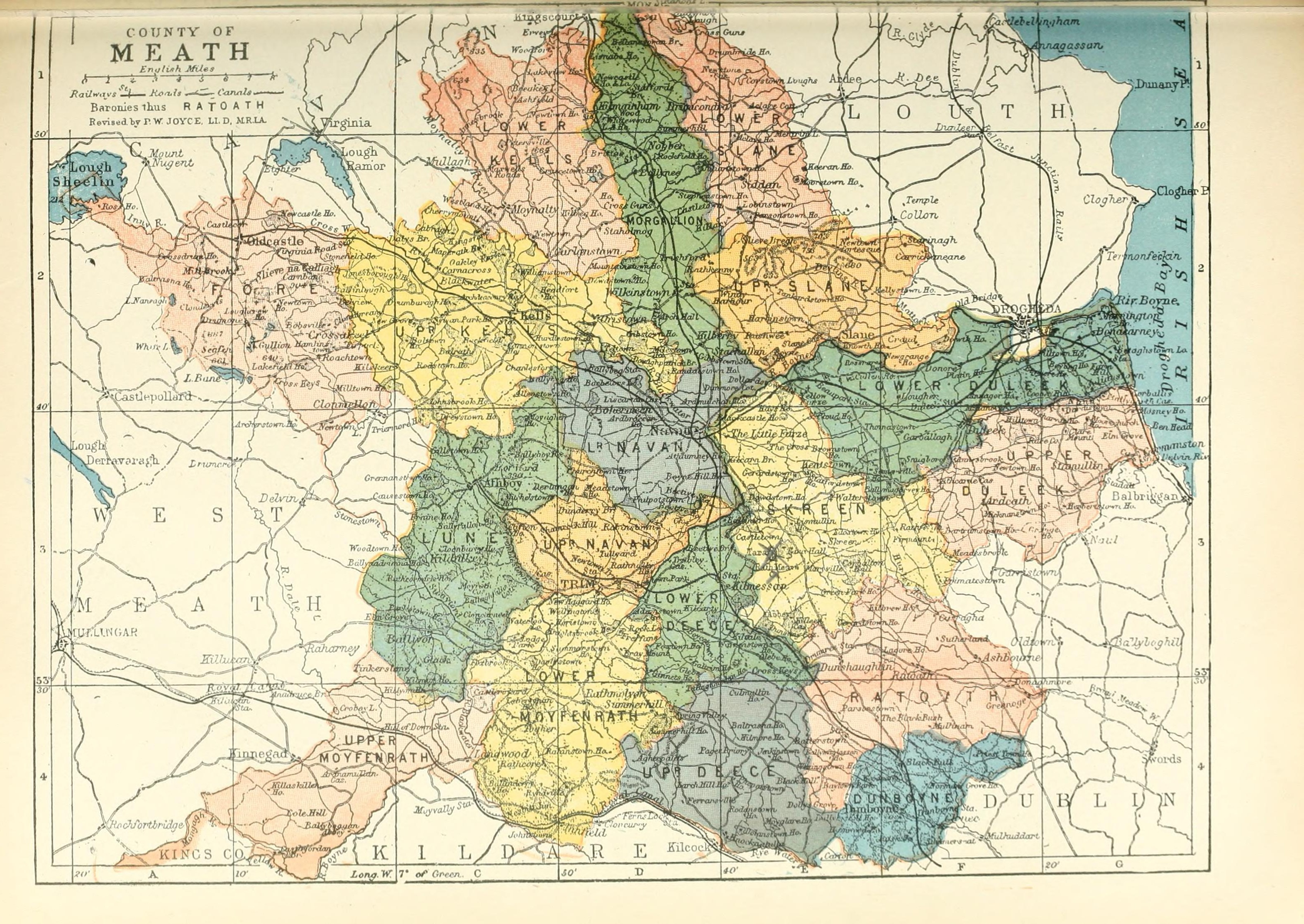
- Barony map of County Meath, 1900; Kells Lower is in the northwest, coloured yellow.

- Location within Ireland
- Coordinates: 53°49′14″N 6°51′20″W
- Country: Republic of Ireland
- Province: Leinster
- County: Meath

Area
  - Total: 146.5 km^{2} (56.6 sq mi)

Kells Lower (or Lower Kells, Irish: Ceanannas Íochtarach) is a barony in County Meath, Ireland.

== Location ==
Kells Lower lies to the north of the town of Kells, County Meath and to the east of Lough Ramor. It has an area of 146.5 square kilometres (56.6 sq mi). It contains ten civil parishes: Cruicetown, Emlagh, Enniskeen, Kilbeg, Kilmainham, Moybolgue, Moynalty, Newtown, Nobber, and Staholmog. The earliest record of the place, in the form Cenondas, is from 690 in the Life of St. Patrick preserved in the Book of Armagh.

== 1846 description ==
The 1846 Parliamentary Gazetteer of Ireland said,

KELLS (LOWER and UPPER), two baronies on the west aide of the county of Meath, Leinster. They are bounded, on the north, by the baronies of Slane and Morgallion; on the east, by the baronies of Morgallion and Navan; on the south, by the barony of Lune and the county of Westmeath; and, on the west, by the barony of Demifore and the county of Cavan. Their greatest length, south-south-westward, is 15 1/2 miles; and their greatest breadth in the opposite direction is 13. Area of Lower Kell, 36,171 acres, 1 rood. 26 perches,—of which 147 acres, 16 perches are water. Area of Upper Kell, 49,552 acres, 1 rood, 8 perches,—of which 61 acres, 32 perches are water. The Blackwater and Moynalty rivers run right across the baronies, and form a confluence a little before passing away to the east. The surface of the land is beautifully diversified with gentle swells; but, with one or two unimportant exceptions, is nearly all strictly champaign. The predominant soil is a rich loam extremely productive, equally suited to tillage and to grazing, and so deep that even in the tops of the rising grounds it may be unsparingly trenched 4 feet for renovation.

But a dismal account is given by John Power, Esq., in an official parliamentary document, of the state of husbandry, as it existed in 1835. "Unless upon natural meadow," says he, "or where the land has been long enough in grass to form a natural sward. the hay and grass are generally injured, especially in quality, by the land being often laid down in a very foul state, and by its being sown with a great quantity of rubbish, generally the sweepings of the stables and stackyards, which, though honoured with the name of hay seeds, is often more entitled to that of weed seeds. The meadow and pasture land is also completely overrun with ragweed, thistles, and every other kind of weeds, which are suffered to vegetate in full luxuriance, and to run to seed. To see those weeds in full flower or seed standing as high and nearly as thick as a crop of corn, over hundreds if not some thousands of acres of the finest grass land, was indeed a singular and deplorable spectacle. • • • In short, Lower Kells contains some of the very worst farming which the English Assistant Commissioner recollects to have seen in any part of Great Britain, or the Continent; and one of the chief proprietors in that barony, who has also travelled much, expressed the same opinion."

As of 1846 the population was 13,666. 2,109 families were mainly engaged in agriculture, 319 in manufacture and trade, and 134 in other occupations. Of males at or above the age of five, 2,458 could read and write, 1,955 could read but not write and 1,055 could neither read nor write. Of females at or above the age of five, 776 could read and write, 1,163 could read but not write and 4,410 could neither read nor write.

== Sources ==
- "Barony of Lower Kells, Co. Meath", Townlands.ie
- "Ceanannas Íochtarach", logainm.ie (in Irish)
- "Relation: Kells Lower (4852967)", OpenStreetMap
- The Parliamentary Gazetteer of Ireland: Adapted to the New Poor-law, Franchise, Municipal and Ecclesiastical Arrangements, and Compiled with a Special Reference to the Lines of Railroad and Canal Communication, as Existing in 1814-45, vol. 2, A. Fullarton and Company, 1846
