= Thomas Meredith (archdeacon of Singapore) =

Thomas Meredith, MA was a Welsh churchman, the Archdeacon of Singapore from 1892 until 1890.

Meredith was the son of James Meredith of Flintshire, educated at Exeter College, Oxford, where he matriculated in 1864, graduating B.A. in 1868, M.A. in 1871,; and was ordained in 1870. After a curacy in Erbistock he was Chaplain to Sir Watkin Williams-Wynn, 6th Baronet from 1872 to 1875; and then Curate at Holy Trinity Marylebone before journeying to Singapore in 1880.
