= Swithland Hall =

Country house in Swithland, Leicestershire, England

Coordinates: 52°42′30.75″N 1°10′23.00″W

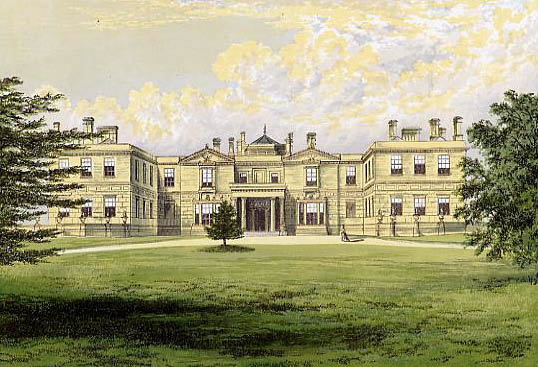
From Morris's Country Seats (1880)

Swithland Hall is a 19th-century Neoclassical country house in Swithland, Leicestershire, designed by James Pennethorne.

== History ==
The present Swithland Hall was built for George John Danvers-Butler, later Earl of Lanesborough. Designed by the architect James Pennethorne, it was complete enough to be occupied by 1834, and was finished by 1852. The house replaced an earlier one on the estate. T.R. Potter recorded in his History and Antiquities of Charnwood Forest (1842):

The residence of the owners of Swithland was, till the present generation, situated near the Church. It was a considerable pile, but so surrounded on all sides, even in front, by stables, dovecotes and high walls, and so close to the public road, that the present proprietor has judiciously pulled it down, and erected on a higher ground a mansion more suited to the taste of the age.

It is built of stuccoed and painted granite and slate rubble and brick, with Swithland slate roofs concealed by a parapet. It consists of a central block and two wings in a restrained neo-classical style with banded rustication to the ground floor. It has two storeys, with a sunken basement. The entrance front has one-storey porch with four paired fluted Doric columns up four stone steps.

The house was Grade II listed in 1979.
