= County Meath (Parliament of Ireland constituency) =

Pre-1801 Irish constituency

- Former county constituency for the Irish House of Commons
- County: County Meath

–1801
- Seats: 2
- Replaced by: County Meath

County Meath was a constituency represented in the Irish House of Commons until 1800.

== Members of Parliament ==
- 1370 (Dublin): James de la Hyde and John Fitz John
- 1370 (Kilkenny): Simon Cusak and John Rothwelle
- 1372 (Kilkenny): John Prout
- 1374 Sir Richard Plunkett
- 1376: William de Londoun, Knight and Richard Plunket were elected to come to England to consult with the king and council about the government of Ireland and about an aid for the king.
- 1378 John Freignes (amerced of 100 marks for non-attendance)
- 1560 Sir Christopher Cheevers and Patrick Barnewall of Crickston
- 1585 Richard Barnewall of Crickstown and John Netterville of Dowth
- 1613 Robert Barnewall of Robertstown and Patrick Hussey, 13th Baron Galtrim
- 1634–1635 Nicholas Plunkett and Patrick Hussey, 13th Baron Galtrim
- 1639–1642 Sir Richard Barnewall, 2nd Baronet (expelled) and Nicholas Plunkett (expelled)
- 1642–1649 Sir John Temple and Thomas Ashe
- 1661 Sir Robert Forth and Sir Theophilus Jones

=== 1689–1801 ===
Election	First MP	Second MP
1689	Sir William Talbot, 3rd Baronet	Sir Patrick Barnewall, 3rd Baronet
1692	Charles Meredyth	John Osborne
1695	Sir John Dillon	Thomas Bligh
1709	John Preston	Thomas Bligh
1711	John Preston	Garret Wesley
1715	John Preston	James Napper
1719	John Preston	Peter Ludlow
1733	James Lenox Napper (Note: from 1743 James Napper-Dutton)	Peter Ludlow
1751	James Lenox Napper	Arthur Francis Meredyth
1761	Hercules Langford Rowley	Gorges Lowther
1792	Hercules Langford Rowley	Hamilton Gorges
1794	Thomas Taylour, Viscount Headfort	Hamilton Gorges
1795	Hon. Clotworthy Taylor (Note: from 1796 Hon. Clotworthy Rowley)	Hamilton Gorges
1800	Marcus Somerville	Hamilton Gorges
1801	Succeeded by Westminster constituency County Meath	
