= William Somerville, 1st Baron Athlumney =

British politician

The Right Honourable The Lord Athlumney PC

Chief Secretary for Ireland
- In office 22 July 1847 – 21 February 1852
- Monarch: Victoria
- Prime Minister: Lord John Russell
- Preceded by: Henry Labouchere
- Succeeded by: Lord Naas

Personal details
- Born: 1802
- Died: 7 December 1873 Dover, Kent
- Party: Liberal
- Spouse(s): (1) Lady Maria Conyngham (d. 1843) (2) Maria Jones (1831-1899)
- Education: Christ Church, Oxford

William Meredyth Somerville, 1st Baron Athlumney, 1st Baron Meredyth PC (1802 – 7 December 1873), known as Sir William Somerville, Bt, between 1831 and 1863, was an Anglo-Irish Liberal politician.

== Background and education ==
Athlumney was born in 1802, the son of Sir Marcus Somerville, 4th Baronet of Somerville, in the County of Meath, and Mary Anne, daughter of Sir Richard Gorges-Meredyth, 1st Baronet. He was educated at Christ Church, Oxford.

== Political career ==
Athlumney was returned to Parliament for Drogheda in 1837, a seat he held until 1852, and served under Lord John Russell as Under-Secretary of State for the Home Department from 1846 to 1847 and as Chief Secretary for Ireland from 1847 to 1852 during the worst of the Great Famine. In 1847 he was sworn of the Privy Council. He lost his seat in the 1852 general election, but was successfully returned for Canterbury in 1854, and continued to represent this constituency until 1865. In 1863 he was raised to the Peerage of Ireland as Baron Athlumney, of Somerville and Dollarstown in the County of Meath, and in 1866 he was further honoured when he was created Baron Meredyth, of Dollarstown in the County of Meath, in the Peerage of the United Kingdom. This second title commemorated his descent from the Meredyth family.

== Family ==
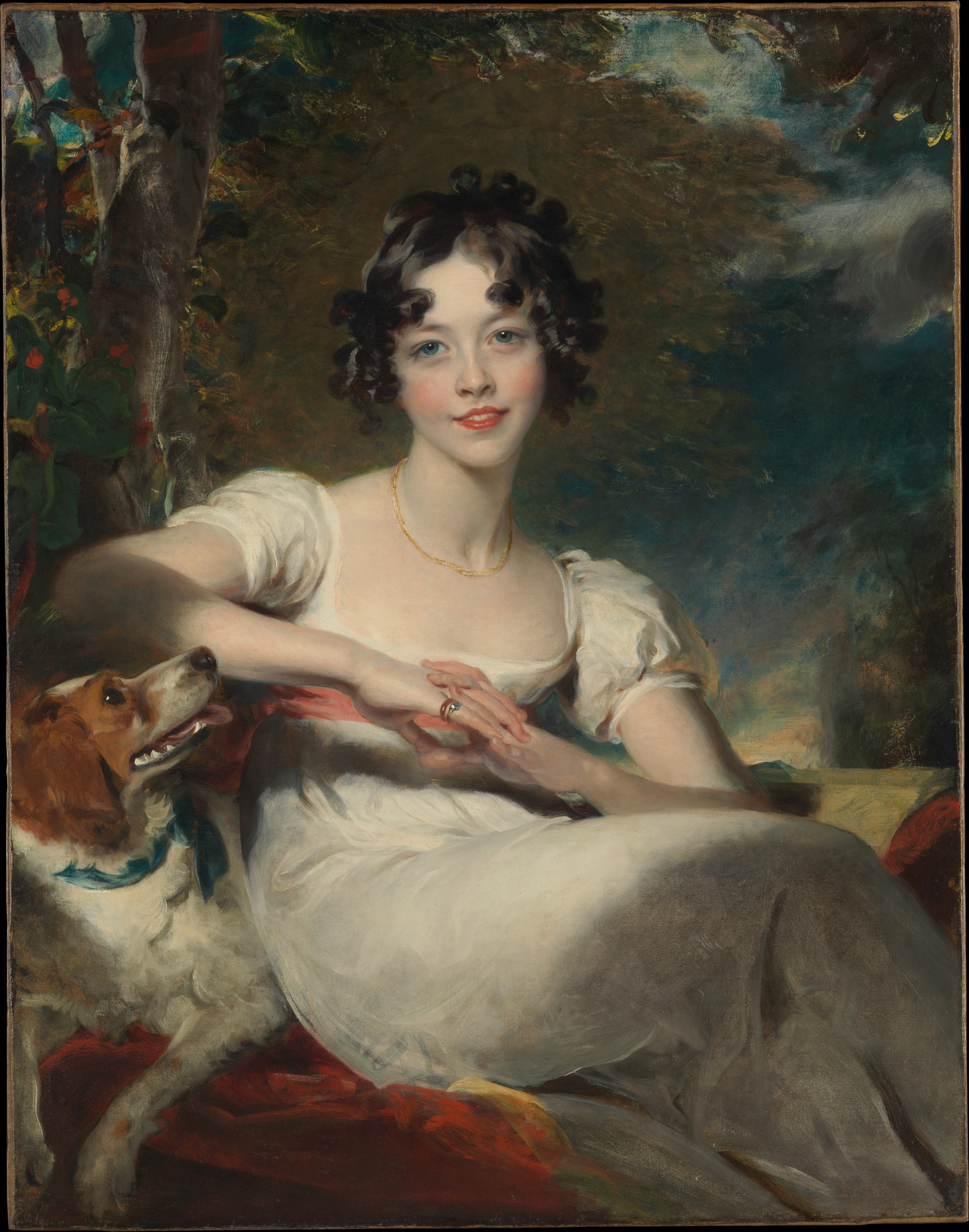
Portrait of Lady Maria Conyngham by Thomas Lawrence, 1825

Lord Athlumney married firstly Lady Maria Harriet, daughter of Henry Conyngham, 1st Marquess Conyngham, in 1832. They had one son (who died as an infant) and one daughter. After her death in December 1843 he married secondly Maria Georgiana Elizabeth, daughter of Herbert George Jones, in 1860. They had two sons (of whom the youngest died as a child). Lord Athlumney died in Dover, Kent, in December 1873 and was succeeded by his eldest and only surviving son from his second marriage, James. Lady Athlumney died in January 1899, aged 67.

== Arms ==
Coat of arms of William Somerville, 1st Baron Athlumney
Crest A Demi-Lion rampant Sable charged on the shoulder with a Cross Crosslet fitchée and two Mullets Argent Escutcheon Azure three Mullets Or two and one between seven Cross Crosslets fitchée Argent three one two and one Supporters Dexter: A Greyhound proper collared Gules and charged on the shoulder with a Mullet and two Cross Crosslets fitchée Sable; Sinister: A Lion rampant Sable collared and chained Or charged on the shoulder with a Cross Crosslet fitchée and two Mullets Argent Motto Crains Dieu tant que tu viveras

Parliament of the United Kingdom
Preceded by Randall Plunkett	Member of Parliament for Drogheda; 1837–1852	Succeeded by James McCann
Preceded by Henry Plumptre Gipps; Henry Butler-Johnstone	Member of Parliament for Canterbury; 1854–1865; With: Charles Manners Lushington 1854–1857; Henry Butler-Johnstone 1857–1862; Henry Munro-Butler-Johnstone 1862–1865	Succeeded by Henry Munro-Butler-Johnstone; John Walter Huddlestone
Political offices
Preceded by John Manners-Sutton	Under-Secretary of State for the Home Department; 1846–1847	Succeeded by Sir Denis La Marchant, Bt
Preceded by Henry Labouchere	Chief Secretary for Ireland; 1847–1852	Succeeded by Lord Naas
Peerage of Ireland
New creation	Baron Athlumney; 1863–1873	Succeeded by James Somerville
Peerage of the United Kingdom
New creation	Baron Meredyth; 1866–1873	Succeeded by James Somerville
Baronetage of Ireland
Preceded by Marcus Somerville	Baronet (of Somerville); 1831–1873	Succeeded by James Somerville
