= Adam Loftus, 1st Viscount Loftus =

- Born: 1568
- Died: 1643 (aged 74–75)
- Spouse(s): Sarah Bathow
- Parent(s): Robert Loftus

Adam Loftus, 1st Viscount Loftus (c. 1568 – 1643), was Lord Chancellor of Ireland from 1619 and from 1622 raised to the peerage of Ireland as Viscount Loftus of Ely, King's County. His uncle, another Adam Loftus, was both Lord Chancellor of Ireland and Church of Ireland primate.

Lord Loftus clashed with the Lord Deputy of Ireland, Viscount Falkland, in 1624; and in the late 1630s his quarrel with Falkland's successor, The 1st Viscount Wentworth, was even fiercer. Lord Wentworth was created The 1st Earl of Strafford in January 1640. One of the principal articles of the then Lord Strafford's impeachment in 1641, which led to his attainder and execution for treason, was based on his alleged mistreatment of Lord Loftus.

== Early life ==
Loftus was the second son of Robert Loftus; little is known of his mother. His grandfather was Edward Loftus of Swineside, of the parish of Coverham, Yorkshire. In or about 1592, his uncle Adam Loftus, Lord Chancellor of Ireland and Archbishop of Dublin, who knew how to look after his own family, bestowed upon his nephew a prebend of St. Patrick's Cathedral, Dublin, without a cure of souls. The young man was then in holy (or perhaps only deacon's) orders, and had been for three or four years a Master of Arts, probably of the University of Cambridge. Two years later he held the archdeaconry of Glendalough, and on 17 September 1597, he was made judge of the Irish Marshal's Court. The patent calls him Bachelor of Civil Law, and notes his good knowledge therein.

== Career ==
During the Elizabethan wars in Ireland martial law was commonly imposed, and the object of Loftus's appointment as judge of the Irish Marshal's Court was to secure that its decrees should be "orderly and judiciously examined and determined". He was the only holder of this office, which became obsolete in the next reign. Loftus afterwards complained that his ill-paid duties as a judge had obliged him to abandon a lucrative practice in the ecclesiastical courts.

On 8 November 1598 he was made a master in chancery, and a year later he obtained an interest in lands leased by his uncle with the consent of the chapters of St. Patrick's and Christ Church Cathedral, Dublin. In 1604 the archbishop officially described his nephew, a professor of civil law and his own vicar-general, as archdeacon of Glendalough Cathedral, and as keeping a competent vicar to perform the parochial duties attached. The archdeacon was soon afterwards knighted. Later, Archbishop Laud protested strongly against this arrangement, but Loftus kept Glendalough until his death.

In 1607 he seems to have gone to England; on 21 March Archbishop Jones, whose chancellor he then was, recommended him strongly to Robert Cecil, 1st Earl of Salisbury, then the dominant figure in the English Government. Three months later he obtained a lifetime annuity of £219. Early in 1608, Loftus was made a member of the Irish Privy Council. He seems to have worked well with Lord-Deputy Chichester, who praised his conduct in the marshal's court. In 1610 he had a bitter dispute with Lord Thomond, which Salisbury decided against him. In 1611 he became constable of Maryborough, Queen's County, which was already a virtual sinecure.

Loftus was returned, along with Sir Francis Rushe, as MP for King's County in the Irish Parliament of 1613, more apparently by the act of the sheriff than by the choice of the freeholders, and he was one of the Protestant majority who made Sir John Davies Speaker of the House of Commons, over the vehement objections of the Catholic minority, who had voted for Sir John Everard. In the following year, he had a grant of forfeited lands in Wexford.

== Lord Chancellor of Ireland ==
In the summer of 1618, Loftus went to England, carrying with him a commendatory letter from Lord-Deputy St. John and his Council, and in the following year, he was made one of the Commissioners of the Court of Wards. Thomas Jones, Archbishop of Dublin, died on 10 April 1619, and on the 23rd Loftus was appointed Lord Chancellor in his stead.

=== Clash with Lord Falkland ===
On the recall of St. John in May 1622, Loftus was appointed Lord Justice of Ireland and he was at the same time created Viscount Loftus of Ely. In the privy seal directing this creation James I said he had bestowed this hereditary honour on him "that his virtues may be recorded to future ages, so long as there shall remain an heir male to his house". As Lord Chancellor, Loftus was included in the commissions which inquired into the state of the Church and completed the Ulster settlement. With St. John he had always agreed well, and he was at first on good terms with the new Lord Deputy, Henry Cary, 1st Viscount Falkland, but by 1624 they were at open war. The Chancellor refused to affix the Great Seal of Ireland to certain licenses for tanning and distilling, but offered to submit their legality to the decision of the judges. Falkland, as the King's representative, claimed that he had in practice the power to overrule all legal objections, as Strafford was to do after him. The dispute lasted long, Loftus complaining bitterly that his thirty years' service was despised, that his dues were not paid, and that he had but £300 a year to support the dignity of his great place. These complaints appeared well founded, and half the fines of chancery writs were granted to him in 1625.

The accession of Charles I made no difference to the bad relations between Falkland and his Chancellor, and in May 1627 the latter was summoned to England, the Great Seal being placed in commission. After a long inquiry Charles I declared Loftus quite innocent of all charges made against him as a judge, and in May 1628 Falkland was ordered to reinstate him fully, and to treat him with the respect due to himself and to his office. In 1629 the King granted Loftus the unusual favour of a general license to visit England when he pleased, leaving the Great Seal in the hands of the commissioners last appointed, of whom his cousin, Sir Adam Loftus of Rathfarnham was one. Falkland left Ireland in August 1629, and the Chancellor became for the second time Lord Justice of Ireland along with Sir Richard Boyle, afterwards Earl of Cork. In 1632 Loftus took an active part in forcing William Newman, afterwards his chaplain, upon Trinity College Dublin as a fellow.

== Clash with Wentworth ==
Lord Falkland's successor, The 1st Viscount Wentworth, did not reach Ireland until the summer of 1633, but Loftus wrote him a congratulatory letter as soon as his appointment was known. He thanked him for some former services, deplored his own differences with Falkland, and promised to deserve the favour of one "whose fame had outrun his presence". When Lord Wentworth arrived he had to deal with a Lord Chancellor who had been acting Viceroy for four years. Until 1636, the two men seem to have got on pretty well together; however, on 23 April of that year, Wentworth wrote to Bishop Bramhall of Loftus and of "that fury his lady" (Sarah Barlow) in disparaging terms.

Lord Wentworth now accused Lord Loftus of a variety of corrupt or at the least irregular practices, including hearing cases at his private residence, rather than in open Court (although Wentworth sometimes did this himself, and the practice could be defended on the grounds of convenience and saving of costs). More seriously, Loftus was accused of never giving judgment except in return for a bribe.

Wentworth's first attack was indirect: Loftus's second son Edward was accused of corruption in administering the estate of one Metcalfe. Edward prudently left the country, much to Wentworth's fury; Wentworth insisted on his return to Ireland (that he could enforce such a demand is a sign of his power). Edward was forced to apologise for his defiance of the Lord Deputy, and was briefly imprisoned.

Wentworth then moved directly against Loftus in the Lord Deputy's own prerogative court, the Court of Castle Chamber, the Irish equivalent of Star Chamber. He evidently reasoned that Loftus, despite his legal training, would be at a disadvantage in Castle Chamber, since Wentworth could simply overrule Loftus's arguments by use of the royal prerogative. A farmer named John Fitzgerald had managed, despite Loftus's attempt to intercept it, to send a petition to Wentworth claiming that Loftus had first given judgment against him without hearing him or his witnesses in his defence. Loftus had then imprisoned him for allegedly hiding a crop of wheat, his principal asset, to avoid paying the judgment debt, despite Fitzgerald's plea that, as a prudent farmer, he had simply stored the crop in his barns. Castle Chamber, without pre-judging the case, asked Loftus to release Fitzgerald pending a further inquiry, but he refused to do so, despite repeated reminders.

Lord Wentworth resolved to use the Fitzgerald case, together with the controversy over the Loftus-Rushe marriage settlement (below), to finally destroy Loftus. In this he was successful, but he could not prevent Loftus from retiring to England, where he worked diligently for Wentworth's downfall.

=== The Loftus marriage settlement controversy ===
In 1621, the Lord Chancellor's eldest son, Sir Robert Loftus, married Eleanor Ruishe, daughter of Sir Francis Ruishe; her sisters, Mary and Anne, respectively married The 1st Earl of Mountrath and Sir George Wentworth, the Lord Deputy's brother. Sir Francis died in 1629, leaving his three daughters as his co-heiresses. Sir Robert Loftus and his wife lived in the Chancellor's house, and mainly at his expense, until the beginning of 1637, when the lady's half-brother, Sir John Gifford, petitioned the King, as her next friend, for specific performance of her father-in-law's alleged promise to make her a post-nuptial settlement. The consideration for the promised settlement was that she had brought with her a marriage portion of 1,750l.

As the Lord Chancellor could scarcely be the judge in his own case, the matter was referred to the Lord Deputy and the Privy Council, who decided, upon the evidence of a single witness, who testified to words spoken nearly twenty years before, that Loftus must settle upon Sir Robert Loftus and his children by Eleanor Ruishe his house at Monasterevin, County Kildare, furnished, and £1,200 a year in land. The promise, if promise there was, had been purely verbal, and it was not pretended that there was anything to bind the Lord Chancellor in law. He declared that all his land was not worth more than £800 a year, out of which he had settled a jointure of about £300 a year on his daughter-in-law; and he declined altogether to oust his second son, Edward, who ultimately succeeded to the peerage. Costs were given against Loftus, who refused to pay them and appealed to the King. His property was sequestered, and he was imprisoned in Dublin Castle from February 1637 until May 1639, and afterwards in his own house until August, the great seal being transferred to commissioners.

Wentworth, as so often throughout his career, aggravated matters by his habit of bullying, and ordered Loftus to kneel in his presence; the furious old man, who whatever his faults certainly did not lack courage, said that he would die first. He accused the Lord Deputy of partiality at the trial, but apologised and withdrew the charges as being unsupported by evidence and as not proper to be lightly made against a viceroy. Even this was not enough for Lord Wentworth, and the Chancellor had to make his whole estate over to trustees as security before he was allowed to go to England to prosecute his appeal. Wentworth's friends, Christopher Wandesford and Sir Philip Mainwaring, were two of those trustees.

In November 1639, the Chancellor's appeal was heard before the King in Council and dismissed. The Great Seal of Ireland was in December 1639 given to Sir Richard Bolton. Young Lady Loftus had died in the previous summer, "one of the noblest persons", Wentworth wrote, "I ever had the happiness to be acquainted with. … With her are gone the greatest part of my affections to the country, and all that is left of them shall be thankfully and religiously paid to her excellent memory and lasting goodness". In January 1640, Viscount Wentworth was advanced further in the Peerage of England when he was created The 1st Earl of Strafford.

When the Long Parliament met Loftus appealed to it, and on 3 May 1642, the English House of Lords quashed all the decisions against him. The question was again raised after the Restoration, during the viceroyalty of The 1st Earl of Essex, whose report to the King gives the best general account of the whole affair. The result was that the House of Lords in England, after several days' hearing, reversed the decree made in 1637, thus finally and solemnly declaring that Charles I, Lord Strafford, and their respective councils had been wrong throughout. His arbitrary treatment of Lord Loftus formed part of the eighth article of Strafford's impeachment.

Eleanor Loftus herself was Strafford's close friend, as well as the sister of his brother's wife, but there is no evidence that she was his mistress, and his words quoted above do not support the accusation, which seems to rest upon some ambiguous expressions in Clarendon's History. Richard Bagwell in the DNB article states "On the other hand, it may be thought suspicious that Sir Robert Loftus refused to join in his wife's suit against his father".

== Last years ==
After his fall, Lord Loftus lived at or near his small property at Coverham in Yorkshire. His son Edward had married Jane Lyndley, daughter and heiress of Arthur Lyndley of Middleham, and seems to have been then in possession of Middleham Castle, Yorkshire. In 1641 the ex-chancellor was one of several Irish lords and gentlemen living in England who petitioned Parliament against disseminators of false news from Ireland. The outbreak of the Irish Rebellion in 1641 rendered his Irish estates worthless; like so many of Strafford's enemies who helped to bring about and then rejoiced in his destruction, he found that Strafford's death precipitated the collapse of the stability of the society he had lived in. He died at the beginning of 1643, and was buried in Coverham Church.

== Family ==
Loftus married Sarah Bathow (died 1650), of whom Strafford spoke unkindly, widow of Richard Meredith, Bishop of Leighlin, by whom he had four sons and two daughters, including:

- Robert, who married Eleanor Ruishe, daughter of Sir Francis Ruishe and Mary Giffard, but died before his father, leaving only a daughter.
- Edward who was succeeded to the peerage as the 2nd Viscount. He married Jane Lyndley, daughter of Arthur Lyndley of Middleham, and had issue.
- The younger daughter, Alice, married Charles Moore, 2nd Viscount Moore of Drogheda by whom she had several children. In June 1639 she was seen on her knees before the King at Berwick-upon-Tweed, "very earnestly soliciting for her father's coming over". On the extinction of the male Loftus line, Monasterevin passed through her children to the Moore family. After her husband's death in battle in 1643, she broke with the King and was briefly imprisoned for conspiracy. She died of gangrene in 1649 following a fall from her horse.

The title, which became extinct on the death of his grandson, the 3rd Viscount, in 1725 (when the family estate of Monasterevin, renamed Moore Abbey, passed to his daughter's son Henry, 4th Earl of Drogheda), was re-granted in 1756 to his cousin Nicholas Loftus, a lineal descendant of the archbishop. It again became extinct more than once afterwards, but was on each occasion revived in favour of a descendant through the female line; and it later became held by the Marquess of Ely in conjunction with other family titles.

In 1900 the Marquess of Drogheda possessed a portrait of the Chancellor, and many interesting papers connected with him.

== Reputation ==
Strafford's biographer C.V. Wedgwood paints an unfavourable picture of Loftus: "corrupt, crafty, cunning, mean and vain". She admits that had legal ability, but argues that he owed his rise less to his own talents than to his powerful family connections. Elrington Ball, in his definitive study of the pre-independence Irish judiciary, paints a picture which is not dissimilar but somewhat less severe.

== Notes ==
Peerage of Ireland
New creation	Viscount Loftus; 1622–1646	Succeeded by Edward Loftus
Legal offices
Preceded by In commission – last held by Archbishop Thomas Jones	Lord Chancellor of Ireland; 1619–1639	Succeeded by Richard Bolton
