= Arthur Meredyth (died 1732) =

Irish politician

Arthur Meredyth (March 1639 – 4 May 1732) was an Irish politician.

Meredyth was the second son of Thomas Meredyth and Letitia Fortescue, and the grandson of Richard Meredith.

He was High Sheriff of Meath in 1679 and 1682. Meredyth was the Member of Parliament for Navan in the Irish House of Commons between 1692 and 1713, and again from 1715 to 1727.

He married Dorothea Bingley in 1661 and a daughter and four sons, including Thomas Meredyth.

Parliament of Ireland
Preceded by Christopher Cusack of Corballis; Christopher Cusack of Rathaldran	Member of Parliament for Navan; 1692-1713; With: Francis Osborne (1690-1703); Thomas Meredyth (1703-1713)	Succeeded by Henry Meredyth; Nathaniel Preston
Preceded by Henry Meredyth; Nathaniel Preston	Member of Parliament for Navan; 1715-1727; With: Nathaniel Preston	Succeeded by Thomas Meredyth; Nathaniel Preston
