= Thomas Meredyth (Old Leighlin MP) =

Irish politician

Sir Thomas Meredyth (died 1677) was an Irish politician.

Meredyth was the son of Richard Meredith and Sarah Bathow. He was admitted to Trinity College Dublin in 1609 and to Lincoln's Inn in 1628. On 15 July 1630 he was knighted by his step-father, Adam Loftus, 1st Viscount Loftus. Meredyth represented Old Leighlin in the Irish House of Commons from 1634 to 1635.

He married Letitia Fortescue and they had two sons, Charles and Arthur, and two daughters.
