= John Osborne (barrister) =

English barrister who worked primarily in Ireland

John Osborne (c.1630–1692) was an English barrister and law officer who spent much of his adult life in Ireland. He was the only surviving son of the celebrated writer Francis Osborne, and the subject of his father's most famous book, Advice to a Son (1656–1658).

In Ireland, Osborne became Prime Serjeant-at-law under King Charles II. He was a determined opponent of King James II, was removed from office by James's government, and was later proscribed by the Irish Parliament. After the Glorious Revolution he was restored to office as Serjeant-at-law. His notable independence of mind, and his hostility to all former Jacobites, Protestant as well as Roman Catholic, even those who had pledged their loyalty to the new King William III, made him as unacceptable to the new regime as he had been to the old. He was dismissed from office shortly before his death in 1692.

== Family ==
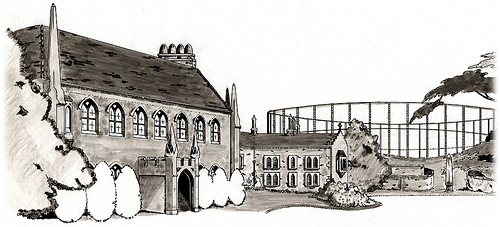
Chicksands Priory, home of the Osborne family for 400 years.

His father Francis Osborne was the fifth son of Sir John Osborne of Chicksands Priory, Shefford, Bedfordshire and his wife Dorothy Barlee of Effingham Hall, Essex. Francis's elder brother was Peter Osborne, Royal Governor of Guernsey during the English Civil War.

Francis Osborne married Anna Draper, sister of the prominent parliamentarian Colonel William Draper of Nether Worton, Oxfordshire. John was the only boy among their four surviving children. Francis was personally close to his brother-in-law and shared his political beliefs, although he played little part in public life. His celebrated book Advice to a Son, which he intended for John's education, was published in two volumes in 1656 and 1658. He moved to Oxford to be closer to his son, and died in 1659 at his brother-in-law's house at Nether Worton, near Banbury.

== Career ==
John Osborne was at Magdalen College from 1648 to 1651 and became a fellow of All Souls' College, on the nomination of his uncle, William Draper. He graduated B.C.L. from All Souls' in 1654, entered the Inner Temple in 1657 and became a bencher of the Temple in 1689.

When precisely Osborne came to Ireland is unclear. He was admitted to the Irish Bar and rose rapidly in his profession. Uniquely, he was made Prime Serjeant, the most senior law officer after the Attorney General for Ireland, in reversion. His patent is dated 1676. He had taken up the office by 1680, and on the death of King Charles II, the new regime renewed his patent of office. However Osborne, as a Protestant, could not have expected to hold the position for long under King James II, who was determined to promote as many Roman Catholics as possible to high office. Osborne was dismissed in 1686.

== Proscription and return to office ==
Given his radical family background, it was natural for Osborne to support King William III in his struggle against James II. On James's arrival in Ireland in 1689, Osborne was proscribed by the Patriot Parliament. Following the downfall of James's cause at the Battle of the Boyne, Osborne was quickly restored to favour.

He was nominated for the office of Chief Justice of the Irish Common Pleas, but William III personally vetoed his appointment in favour of Richard Pyne. Osborne had to be content with resuming office as Prime Serjeant. This may have been an early sign that the government regarded him as a troublemaker.

== Opponent of the Crown ==
Once he was back in office, Osborne's insistence on pursuing his own independent policy quickly angered the new government. William III and his advisers had resolved on a policy of conciliation towards their former enemies in Ireland, especially those who were Protestants, as long as they would pledge their loyalty to William for the future. In open defiance of this policy and without instructions from the Lord Lieutenant of Ireland and without consulting the Attorney General, Osborne began proceedings for treason against all landowners, even Protestants, who had been loyal to James II. Outraged pleas from those thus accused were addressed to the London government, backed by petitions from men of influence like William King, the Bishop of Derry and future Archbishop of Dublin, who wrote that Osborne's conduct had "startled the whole Kingdom".

The result of this controversy was a stern letter from the Secretary of State, the Earl of Nottingham, to the Lord Lieutenant of Ireland Lord Romney, informing him of the King's strong personal disapproval of Osborne's proceedings, which had given "great fear" to precisely those Irish subjects whom the King was seeking to win over to his side. The High Court judges were ordered to immediately halt all treason trials and to reassure those charged with treason that no harm would come to them, so long as they remained on good behaviour. The letter ended with a severe reprimand to Osborne for his "indiscreet zeal".

Lord Romney, Osborne's superior with whom he quarrelled bitterly, leading eventually to his dismissal from office.

Untroubled by official censure, Osborne was apparently prepared to act in open defiance of the royal commands. As late as 1692, Protestant landowners were still complaining of being harassed by him. His enemies argued that his real motive was not loyalty but greed. He was prepared to recommend pardons for those convicted of treason, but expected in return to receive the fees payable for the fiants necessary to obtain them.

He gave even greater offence to the Crown by his conduct in the Irish House of Commons, to which he had been elected as member for County Meath in 1692. This Parliament had been called partly to ratify the Treaty of Limerick, which gave favourable terms to the defeated Roman Catholic supporters of James II. Osborne, who sat on every important committee, led the opposition to these terms as being excessively generous to the Catholics. Such was his powerful opposition that Parliament had to be prorogued in November 1692, after a session of only four weeks. As a result, the relevant articles of the treaty never took effect. Sydney referred to Osborne and his allies in the Commons as "great enemies of the King".

== Dismissal from office and death ==
In the circumstances, Osborne cannot have expected to hold office as Serjeant for much longer. The Lord Lieutenant stated that "He must certainly be turned out of his place" for "Every day he behaves himself more treacherously and ungratefully". His prestige had sunk so low that his office was offered to Sir John Meade, who had previously been regarded as ineligible for any Crown appointment on the grounds that his wife was a Roman Catholic. Osborne was dismissed from office in November 1692 and died suddenly soon afterwards.

Osborne had married his cousin Sarah Draper, daughter of his uncle William Draper and his wife Mary Parsons. They had two children, Francis, who died about 1704, and Elizabeth. His main residence was at Stackallen in County Meath, which his widow sold after his death. The next owner Gustavus Hamilton, 1st Viscount Boyne, built Stackallen House, an impressive mansion which still stands.
