= Henry Meredyth (died 1715) =

Irish politician

Henry Meredyth (1675 – 12 December 1715) was an Irish politician.

Meredyth was the son of Charles Meredyth and his first wife, Anne Blayney.

He represented Kells in the Irish House of Commons between 1710 and 1713, being elected to replace his late father. He subsequently sat for the Navan constituency from 1713 to 1714.

He married Mary Butler 24 Oct 1702.

Parliament of Ireland
Preceded by Charles Meredyth; Brinsley Butler	Member of Parliament for Kells; 1710-1713; With: Brinsley Butler	Succeeded by Sir Thomas Taylor, 1st Bt; Sir Thomas Taylor, 2nd Bt
Preceded by Arthur Meredyth; Thomas Meredyth	Member of Parliament for Navan; 1713-1714; With: Nathaniel Preston	Succeeded by Thomas Meredyth; Nathaniel Preston
