= James Somerville, 2nd Baron Athlumney =

Irish politician and Baron (1865–1929)

Lieutenant Colonel James Somerville, 2nd Lord Athlumney
- Baron Athlumney in 1918.
- Born: James Herbert Gustavus Meredyth Somerville; March 23, 1865
- Died: January 8, 1929 (aged 63); Somerville, Balrath, County Meath, Ireland
- Spouse: Margery Boan (m. 1919–1929)
- Children: None
- Relatives: William Somerville, 1st Baron Athlumney (Father)
- Military career
- Rank: Lieutenant Colonel

James Herbert Gustavus Meredyth Somerville, 2nd Baron Athlumney, 2nd Baron Meredyth (23 March 1865 – 8 January 1929) was an Irish peer and officer of the British Army.

== Early life and background ==
He was the son of William Meredyth Somerville, 1st Baron Athlumney and Maria Georgiana Elizabeth Jones, was baptised on 25 April 1865 at Kentstown, County Meath, Ireland, and was educated at Harrow School, Harrow on the Hill, London, England.

He succeeded to his family's titles on the death of his father, the first Baron Athlumney, on 7 December 1873. He sat in the House of Lords as Baron Meredyth (a UK barony created in 1866 – the barony of Athlumney being Irish).

== Military career ==
Lord Athlumney served firstly in the Prince of Wales's Leinster Regiment (Royal Canadians), before being made extra ADC to the Lord Lieutenant of Ireland (Earl Cadogan). He subsequently served in the Coldstream Guards seeing action in the Dongola Expedition in 1896, where he was mentioned in despatches. After he retired from the regular army, he was appointed captain in the Kent Artillery Militia on 27 January 1897. Following the outbreak of the Second Boer War in late 1899, he again volunteered for active service, leaving Southampton for South Africa on the SS Tantallon Castle in early March 1900. In South Africa he served as staff officer to the Military Governor of Pretoria. He resigned from the Artillery Militia on 30 April 1902. He was appointed a Captain in the Reserve of Officers on 25 July 1902.

During the First World War, he served as Assistant Provost Marshal of London District.

== Family ==
On 30 July 1919 he married Margery Boan, daughter of Henry Boan, at Wellington Barracks, Guards Chapel, Westminster, London, England.

He died on 8 January 1929, at age 63, at Somerville, County Meath, Ireland. On his death, his Baronies became extinct while his Baronetcy became dormant.

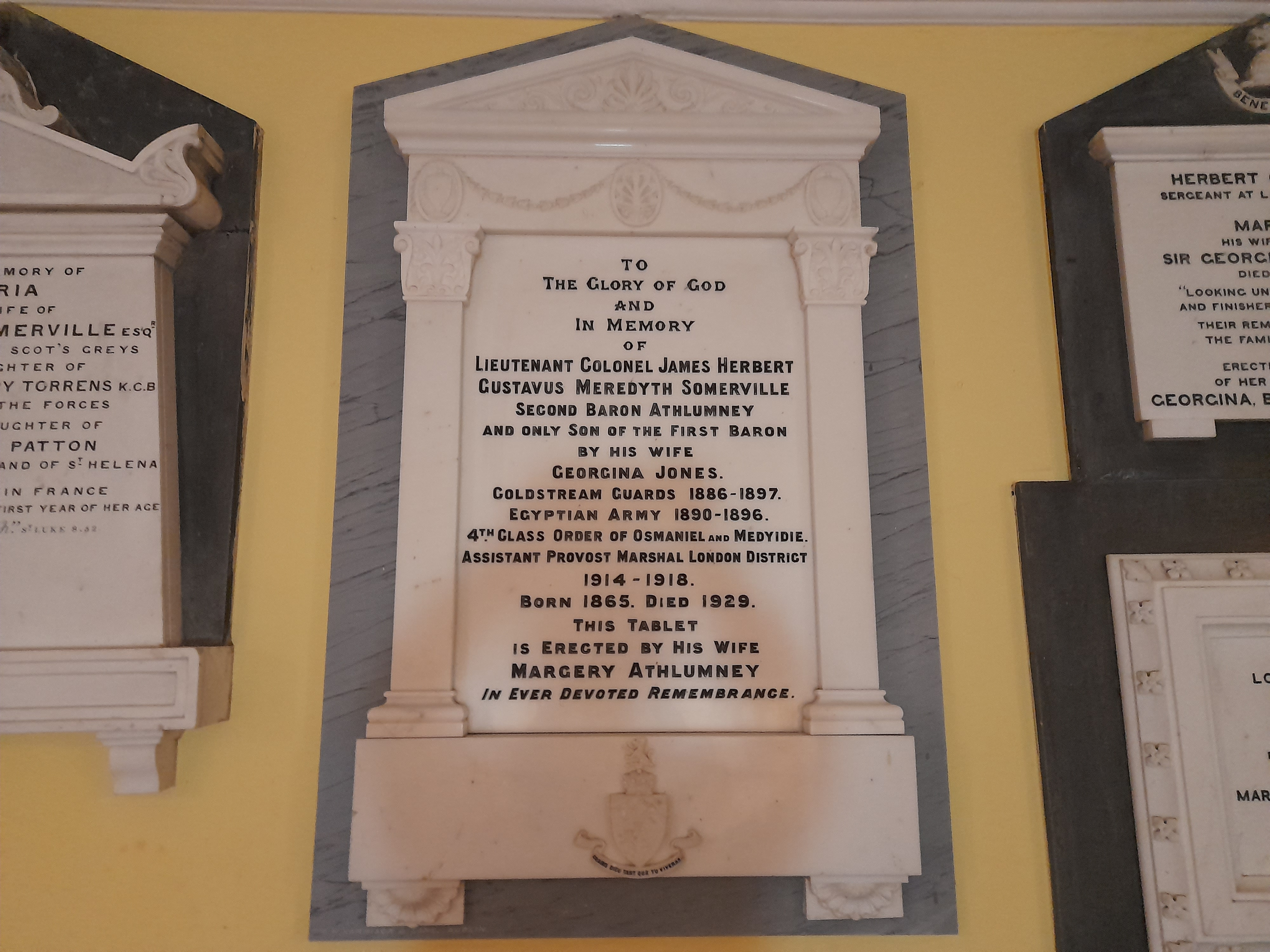
James Somerville, 2nd Baron Athlumney memorial plaque located in Saint Mary's Church of Ireland, Kentstown County Meath.

Lady Athlumney died in July 1946 after drowning in the River Nanny on the family estate.

Peerage of Ireland
| Preceded by William Meredyth Somerville | Baron Athlumney; 1873–1929 | Extinct |
Peerage of the United Kingdom
| Preceded by William Meredyth Somerville | Baron Meredyth; 1873–1929 | Extinct |
Baronetage of Ireland
| Preceded by William Meredyth Somerville | Baronet (of Somerville); 1873–1929 | Dormant |
