= Athy (Parliament of Ireland constituency) =

Pre-1801 Irish constituency

- Former borough constituency for the Irish House of Commons
- County: County Kildare
- Borough: Athy

1614–1801
- Seats: 2
- Replaced by: Disfranchised

Athy was a constituency represented in the Irish House of Commons until its abolition on 1 January 1801. Following the Acts of Union 1800 the borough was disenfranchised.

== History ==
In the Patriot Parliament of 1689 summoned by James II, Athy was represented with two members.

== Members of Parliament, 1560–1801 ==
| Election | First MP | | Second MP |
|---|---|---|---|
| 1560 | Richard Mothill | | Rowland Cassyn |
| 1613 | Walter Weldon | | Sir Robert Digby |
| 1634 | Sir Maurice Eustace | | Edward Blount |
| 1639 | Steven Stephens | | Sir Robert Meredith |
| 1661 | William Weldon | | Henry Brenn |
| 1689 | William FitzGerald | | William Archbold |
| 1692 | Raphael Hunt | | Richard Locke |
| 1695 | Maurice Keating | | Richard Locke |
| 1703 | Maurice Keating | | Richard Meredyth |
| 1713 | Maurice Keating | | John Lyons |
| 1715 | Maurice Keating | | Richard Allen |
| 1727 | Sir Walter Borrowes, 4th Bt | | Marcus Anthony Morgan |
| 1741 | Lord Offaly | | Marcus Anthony Morgan |
| 1744 | Walter Weldon | | Marcus Anthony Morgan |
| 1753 | Walter Weldon | | Robert Sandford |
| May 1761 | Henry Sandford (Note: Also elected for Kildare Borough in 1761, for which he chose to sit) | | James McManus |
| 1761 | Robert Sandford | | James McManus |
| December 1761 | Robert Sandford | | Richard Stearne Tighe |
| 1762 | Robert Sandford | | William Smith |
| 1768 | John St Leger | | William Burgh |
| 1769 | Walter Hussey Burgh | Patriot | William Burgh |
| 1776 | Thomas Burgh | | Thomas Burgh |
| 1783 | Lord Edward FitzGerald | Patriot | Thomas Burgh |
| 1790 | Lord Henry FitzGerald (Note: Also elected for Dublin City in 1790, for which he chose to sit) | Patriot | Arthur Ormsby |
| 1791 | Frederick John Falkiner | | Arthur Ormsby |
| 1798 | William Hare | | Richard Hare |
| 1801 | Constituency disenfranchised | | |

== Bibliography ==
- O'Hart, John (2007). The Irish and Anglo-Irish Landed Gentry: When Cromwell came to Ireland. Vol. II. Heritage Books. ISBN 0-7884-1927-7.
- Johnston-Liik, E. M. (2002). History of the Irish Parliament, 1692–1800, Publisher: Ulster Historical Foundation (28 Feb 2002), ISBN 1-903688-09-4
- T. W. Moody, F. X. Martin, F. J. Byrne, A New History of Ireland 1534–1691, Oxford University Press, 1978
- Leigh Rayment's historical List of Members of the Irish House of Commons. Cites: Johnston-Liik, Edith Mary (2002). The History of the Irish Parliament 1692-1800 (6 volumes). Ulster Historical Foundation.
