= Thomas Meredyth (British Army officer) =

Anglo-Irish soldier and politician (d. 1719)

Lieutenant-General Thomas Meredyth (or Meredith; after 1661–1719), of Chelsea, Middlesex, was an Irish officer of the British Army and a politician who sat in the Parliament of Ireland from 1703 to 1719 and as a Whig in the British House of Commons from 1709 to 1710..

== Early life ==
Meredyth was the second son of Arthur Meredyth of Dollardstown in County Meath and his wife Dorothea Bingley, daughter of John Bingley of Dublin. He was originally intended for a legal career but joined the military instead. He served William III as a cavalry officer in Flanders during the Nine Years' War. In April 1691, he was made Captain in the 3rd Horse, later 2nd Dragoon Guards. He later became Lieutenant-Colonel, and on 1 June 1701 was appointed Adjutant-General of the Forces with promotion to the brevet rank of Colonel of Horse.

== Career ==
In February 1702, Meredyth was appointed Colonel of the 37th Regiment of Foot in the expansion of the Army prior to the War of the Spanish Succession. The regiment was part of the force led by the Duke of Marlborough and Meredyth was promoted Brigadier-General after Blenheim in August 1704. Now in command of a Brigade, he participated in the campaigns of 1705 and 1706, including the Moselle expedition and the forcing of the French lines at Eliksem and Neer-Hespen.

Meredyth was made Major-General in 1706 and Governor of Tynemouth Castle on 20 February 1708. He stood for parliament for Midhurst at the 1708 British general election and after defeat in the poll was seated on petition as Member of Parliament for Midhurst on 8 March 1709. He supported the naturalization of the Palatines in 1709 and after being very ill at Brussels came back to England in October 1709. He was promoted to Lieutenant-General in 1709 and the Duke of Marlborough tried to obtain a colonelcy for him. However the Queen had promised the intended regiment to John Hill, the brother of her favourite Abigail Masham. However he became Colonel of Lord Mordaunt's regiment, the Royal_Scots_Fusiliers or 21st Foot in May 1710. He voted in favour of the impeachment of Dr Sacheverell in 1710. He lost his seat at the 1710 British general election and was dismissed from all his positions in December 1710 for his opposition to the Tory Harley Ministry.

When the Tories fell in 1714, Meredyth was reinstated and appointed Governor of Londonderry, member of the Irish Privy Council and Colonel of the 20th Regiment of Foot.

== Death and legacy ==
Meredyth died at Dublin on 19 June 1719, leaving three children by his marriage. His son Arthur inherited his estate in Oxfordshire. He also made provision in his will, for two illegitimate daughters living in Hertfordshire and a son at school in Lisburn, country Antrim.

Parliament of Ireland
Preceded by Arthur Meredyth; Francis Osborne	Member of Parliament for Navan; 1703–1713; With: Arthur Meredyth	Succeeded by Henry Meredyth; Nathaniel Preston
Preceded by Sir Arthur Shaen, Bt; Sir James Jeffreys	Member of Parliament for Lismore; 1715–1719; With: Sir Arthur Shaen, Bt	Succeeded by Sir Arthur Shaen, Bt; Sir John Osborne
Parliament of Great Britain
Preceded by Laurence Alcock; Robert Orme	Member of Parliament for Midhurst; 1709–1710; With: Laurence Alcock	Succeeded by Laurence Alcock; Robert Orme
Military offices
Preceded by Regiment raised	Colonel of Meredyth's Regiment of Foot; 1702–1710	Succeeded by William Windress
Preceded by Viscount Mordaunt	Colonel of the North British Fuzileers; 1710	Succeeded by The Earl of Orrery
Preceded by John Newton	Colonel of Meredyth's Regiment of Foot; 1714–1719	Succeeded by William Egerton
Court offices
Preceded by William Walsh	Gentleman of the Horse; 1708–1710	Succeeded by Conyers Darcy
