= Arthur Francis Meredyth =

Anglo-Irish politician

Arthur Francis Meredyth (1726 – 1775) was an Anglo-Irish politician.

Meredyth represented County Meath in the Irish House of Commons from 1751 to 1760.

Parliament of Ireland
Preceded by James Lenox Napper; Peter Ludlow	Member of Parliament for County Meath; 1751-1760; With: James Lenox Napper	Succeeded by Hercules Langford Rowley; Gorges Lowther
