= Thomas Meredyth (politician, died 1732) =

Irish Member of Parliament

Thomas Meredyth (c. 1680–2 — 14 January 1731/2) was an Irish Member of Parliament from Newtown, County Meath.

== Biography ==
Meredyth was Chief Prothonotary of the Court of Common Pleas from 1701. He sat in the Irish House of Commons for Wexford from 1713 to 1714, for New Ross from 1715 to 1727, and for Navan from 1727 until his death. He was a Tory.

He was the son of Charles Meredyth, and the father of several children, including Charles, Dean of Ardfert; Henry, MP for Armagh; and Arthur Francis, MP for county Meath.
