= Hamilton baronets =

Nineteen baronetcies have been created for persons with the surname Hamilton, eight in the Baronetage of Nova Scotia, one in the Baronetage of England, five in the Baronetage of Ireland, one in the Baronetage of Great Britain and four in the Baronetage of the United Kingdom. As of 2026 two creations are extant, two are dormant, two are either extinct or dormant and twelve extinct.

- Hamilton baronets of West Port (1627)
- Hamilton baronets of Killock (1628)
- Hamilton baronets of Broomhill (1635): see Lord Belhaven and Stenton
- Hamilton baronets of London (1642)
- Hamilton baronets of Silvertonhill (1646)
- Hamilton baronets of Donalong and Nenagh (1660)
- Hamilton baronets of Monilla (1662): see Sir Hans Hamilton, 1st Baronet
- Hamilton baronets of Haggs (1670)
- Hamilton baronets of Preston (1673): see Stirling-Hamilton baronets
- Hamilton baronets of Mount Hamilton (1683)
- Hamilton baronets of Barnton (1692)
- Hamilton baronets of Rosehall (1703)
- Hamilton baronets of Manor Cunningham (1775): see Sir Henry Hamilton, 1st Baronet
- Hamilton baronets of Marlborough House (1776)
- Hamilton baronets of Dunamana (1781)
- Hamilton baronets of Woodbrook (1814)
- Hamilton baronets of Trebinshun House (1819)
- Hamilton baronets of Cadogan Square (1892): see Sir Charles Hamilton, 1st Baronet
- Hamilton baronets of Ilford (1937)
