= O'Reilly =

O'Reilly Ó Raghallaigh
- Parent house: Uí Briúin Bréifne
- Country: Kingdom of Connacht
- Founder: Ragheallach mac Cathalan
- Final ruler: Maelmordha O'Reilly
- Titles: King of East Bréifne; King of Muintir Maelmórdha; Conde de O'Reilly
- Dissolution: 1602
- Cadet branches: Brady; Vesey

A defaced O'Reilly crest adorns the coat of arms of County Cavan, their historic patrimony

O'Reilly (Irish: Ó Raghallaigh) is a common Irish surname. The O'Reillys were historically the kings of East Bréifne in what is today County Cavan. The clan were part of the Connachta's Uí Briúin Bréifne kindred and were closely related to the Ó Ruairc (O'Rourkes) of West Bréifne. O'Reilly is ranked tenth in the top twenty list of most common Irish surnames. It is also the patronymic form of the Irish name Reilly (Irish: Raghallach).

== Naming conventions ==
Male	Daughter	Wife (Long)	Wife (Short)
Ó Raghallaigh	Ní Raghallaigh	Bean Uí Raghallaigh	Uí Raghallaigh

== Overview ==
Usually anglicised as Reilly, O'Reilly or Riley, the original form of the name, Ó Raghallaigh, denotes "descendant of Raghallach".

The Ó Raghallaigh family were part of the Connachta, with the eponymous Raghallach said to have died at the Battle of Clontarf in 1014.

The name is common and widespread throughout Ireland, ranked 11th most common in 1890 and in 1997.

A self-proclaimed and disputed O'Reilly Clan Chieftain to this day is at odds with the O'Rourke Clan Chieftain because he contests the recognised O'Rourke claim on the title Prince of Breifne. This was settled in 1994 when the Chief Herald of Ireland made the O'Rourke Chief the Prince of Breifne, but the Office of the Chief Herald stopped granting courtesy titles to Gaelic Chiefs in 2003 (see O'Rourke).

== People with the surname ==
=== O'Reilly ===
People with the surname O'Reilly include:

- Alejandro O'Reilly (1722–1794), second Spanish governor of colonial Louisiana
- Andreas O'Reilly (1742–1832), Irish-born Austrian general
- Bernard O'Reilly (1903–1975), Australian author, found the wreck of a Stinson aircraft in the McPherson Range, 1937
- Bernard O'Reilly (bishop of Hartford) (1803–1856), Irish Roman Catholic bishop
- Bernard O'Reilly (bishop of Liverpool) (1824–1894), Irish Roman Catholic bishop
- Bill O'Reilly (born 1949), American commentator and television show host of The O'Reilly Factor on the Fox News Channel
- Bill O'Reilly, Australian cricketer
- Bob O'Reilly, Australian rugby league footballer
- Caitriona O'Reilly, Irish poet and critic
- Cal O'Reilly, Canadian ice hockey player
- Cameron O'Reilly, Irish and Australian businessman
- Cassia O'Reilly, Irish singer-songwriter
- Charles O'Reilly (Irish bishop) (died 1800), Roman Catholic Bishop of Kilmore from 1798 to 1800
- Danny O'Reilly, lead singer of Irish band, The Coronas
- David O'Reilly, several people
- Dermot O'Reilly (1942–2007), Irish-born Canadian singer and songwriter in band Ryan's Fancy, working in Newfoundland and Labrador
- Des O'Reilly (1954–2016), Australian rugby league player
- Ellis O'Reilly (born 1998), British-Irish artistic gymnast
- Emily O'Reilly, Irish journalist
- Emma O'Reilly, Irish physiotherapist and cycling soigneur who worked for Lance Armstrong
- Eugenia O'Reilly-Regueiro, Mexican mathematician
- Finbarr O'Reilly, Canadian photographer
- Gary O'Reilly, English footballer
- Genevieve O'Reilly, Irish actress
- Heather O'Reilly (born 1985), American soccer player
- Hugh Reily (1630–1695), Irish M.P. and political author
- James Reilly (Canadian politician) (1835–1909), Canadian businessman and politician from Alberta
- James O'Reilly, American Roman Catholic priest
- Jennifer O'Reilly (1943–2016), medieval historian of Britain and Ireland
- Joe O'Reilly, Irish politician
- John Reyly (recte O'Reilly) (c. 1646–1717), M.P. for Cavan County in the Parliament of Ireland of 1689
- John B. O'Reilly Jr. (1948–2025), American politician from Michigan
- John O'Reilly (born 1940), Canadian politician from Ontario
- Kyle O'Reilly (born 1987), ring name of Canadian professional wrestler Kyle Greenwood
- Leonora O'Reilly, American feminist
- Luke O'Reilly (disambiguation), several people
- Mary Margaret O'Reilly, assistant director of the United States Bureau of the Mint from 1924 to 1938
- Matthew O'Reilly, Irish politician and farmer
- Nico O'Reilly, English footballer at Manchester City F.C.
- O'Reilly, Lords of Bréifne (c. 1161–1607), Irish rulers
- Patrick Thomas O'Reilly (1833–1892), US Catholic bishop, born in Ireland
- Peter O'Reilly (civil servant) (1827–1905), Irish-born settler and official in the Colony of British Columbia
- Peter O'Reilly (hurler) (1902–1940), Irish hurler
- Philip O'Reilly (Cavan County MP) (c. 1600–1655), M.P. for County Cavan
- Philip Og O'Reilly (c. 1640–1703), M.P. for Cavan Borough in the Parliament of Ireland of 1689
- Philip Reyley (recte O'Reilly) (c. 1630 – after 1689), M.P. for Cavan County in the Parliament of Ireland of 1689
- Randall C. O'Reilly (born 1967), American professor of psychology, developer of Leabra
- Robert O'Reilly (born 1950), American actor
- Ruth O'Reilly (born 1981), Irish rugby union player
- Ryan O'Reilly (ice hockey) (born 1991), Canadian ice hockey player
- Ryan O'Reilly (wrestler) (born 1980), American professional wrestler
- Sam O'Reilly (born 2006), Canadian ice hockey player
- Samuel O'Reilly (1854–1909), American tattoo artist and inventor
- Stephen O'Reilly (born 1964) (better known as Stephen Egerton), American musician
- Stephen O'Reilly, American actor
- Stephen O'Reilly, Australian footballer
- Terry O'Reilly, Canadian hockey player
- Tim O'Reilly (born 1954), Irish-American founder of O'Reilly Media
- Tom O'Reilly (1915–1995), Irish Gaelic footballer and politician
- Tom O'Reilly, Irish Sinn Féin politician
- Tom O'Reilly, Papua New Guinea international
- Tony O'Reilly (1936–2024), Irish businessman
- Valli O'Reilly, American makeup artist
- Walter Cresswell O'Reilly (1877–1954), Australian Commonwealth Film Censor and founding President of the National Trust of Australia

=== O'Riley ===
- Bunny Wailer (1947–2021), Jamaican reggae musician sometimes known as Bunny O'Riley
- Christopher O'Riley (born 1956), American classical pianist and public radio show host
- Don O'Riley (1945–1997), American Major League Baseball pitcher
- Jon Riley (1824–1879), US army deserter also known as John O'Riley
- Matt O'Riley (born 2000), English footballer at Brighton FC

=== Ní Raghallaigh ===
- Shónagh Ní Raghallaigh, Irish politician

== Fictional characters with the surname ==
- Mr. O'Reilly, portrayed by the Irish actor David Kelly in the Fawlty Towers episode "The Builders"
- Aloysius Umbongo N'Danga O'Reilly, in the song "Baguette Dilemma for the Booker Prize Guy" by the band Half Man Half Biscuit on their 2014 album Urge for Offal
- Corporal Walter "Radar" O'Reilly, in the M*A*S*H media franchise
- Reilly O'Reilly, from the adult animated show John Callahan's Quads!

== See also ==
- Riley (disambiguation)
- Ryley (name)
- Riley (surname)
- "Baba O'Riley", a song by The Who
