= Emil Kapaun =

Korean War U.S. Army chaplain and Medal of Honor recipient

Venerable Emil Kapaun
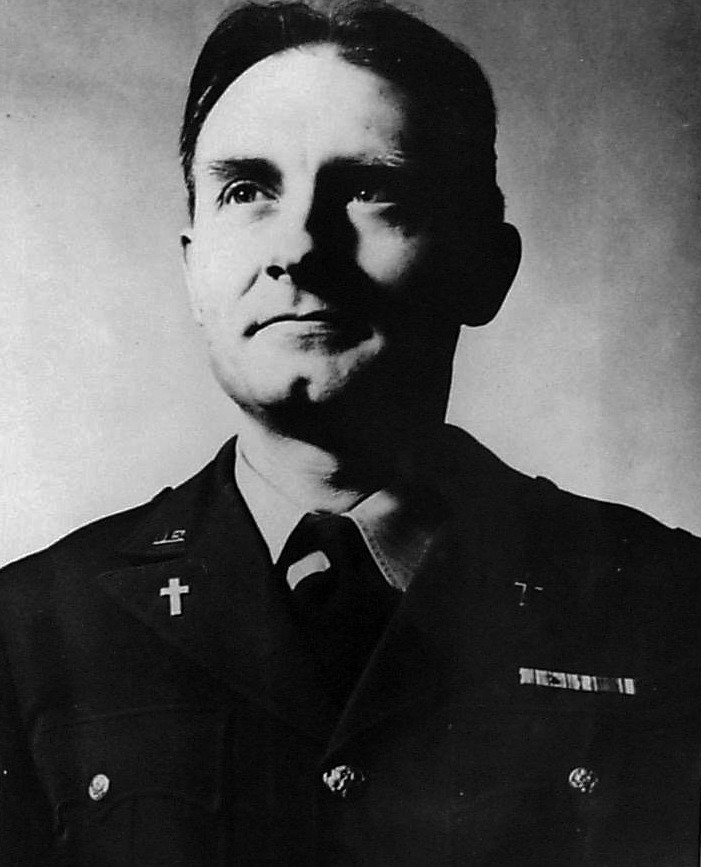
- Captain Chaplain Emil Joseph Kapaun
- Born: April 20, 1916; Pilsen, Kansas, United States
- Died: May 23, 1951 (aged 35); Pyoktong, North Korea
- Burial place: National Memorial Cemetery of the Pacific, Honolulu, Hawaii (1956–2021); Cathedral of the Immaculate Conception, Wichita, Kansas, United States (2021)
- Military career
- Allegiance: United States
- Branch: United States Army
- Service years: 1944–1946; 1948–1951
- Rank: Captain
- Units: 3rd Battalion, 8th Cavalry
- Conflicts: World War II: Pacific War; Burma campaign; Korean War (DOW): Battle of Unsan (POW)
- Awards: Medal of Honor; Legion of Merit; Bronze Star Medal with "V" Device; Purple Heart; Taegeuk Order of Military Merit (South Korea)

Emil Joseph Kapaun (April 20, 1916 – May 23, 1951) was an American Catholic priest and United States Army captain who served as a chaplain during World War II and the Korean War.

Kapaun was a chaplain in the Burma Theater of World War II, then served again as a chaplain with the U.S. Army in Korea, where he was captured. He died in a prisoner of war camp. In 2013, Kapaun posthumously received the Medal of Honor for his actions in Korea. He is the ninth American military chaplain awarded the Medal of Honor. The Defense POW/MIA Accounting Agency (DPAA) announced Kapaun's body was accounted for on March 2, 2021.

In 1993, Pope John Paul II declared Kapaun a Servant of God, the first stage to canonization in the Catholic Church. In 2025, Pope Francis declared him Venerable, the next stage on the path to canonization.

== Early life ==
Emil Kapaun was born on April 20, 1916, in Pilsen Kansas, to Enos and Elizabeth (Hajek) Kapaun. His parents were Czech immigrants from Austria-Hungary. Kapaun grew up on a farm 3 miles (4.8 km) southwest of Pilsen in Marion County. He received his first communion in 1924 and his confirmation in 1929. Kapaun attended a parochial school run by the Adorer of the Precious Blood of Christ Sisters until the tenth grade.

Kapaun graduated from Pilsen High School in 1930. That same year, after deciding to become a priest, Kapaun entered the seminary college of Conception Abbey in Conception, Missouri. He complete his philosophy course work at Conception in 1936 and enrolled at the Kenrick Theological Seminary in St. Louis, Missouri. Kapaun graduated from Kenrick in 1940.

== Priesthood ==
On June 9, 1940, Kapaun was ordained a Catholic priest for the Diocese of Wichita by Bishop Christian Herman Winkelmann at the St. John’s Chapel of Sacred Heart College in Wichita, Kansas. Eleven days later, he celebrated his first mass at St. John Nepomucene Catholic Church in Pilsen.

After his ordination, the diocese assigned Kapaun as assistant pastor at St. John Nepomucene. The United States entered World War II in December 1941, In January 1943, Bishop Christian Herman Winkelmann of Wichita assigned Kapaun to serve as an auxiliary chaplain at the Herington Army Airfield near Herington, Kansas in addition to his parish assignment. Kapuan would spend three days a week at the airfield

== U.S. Army service ==
=== World War II ===
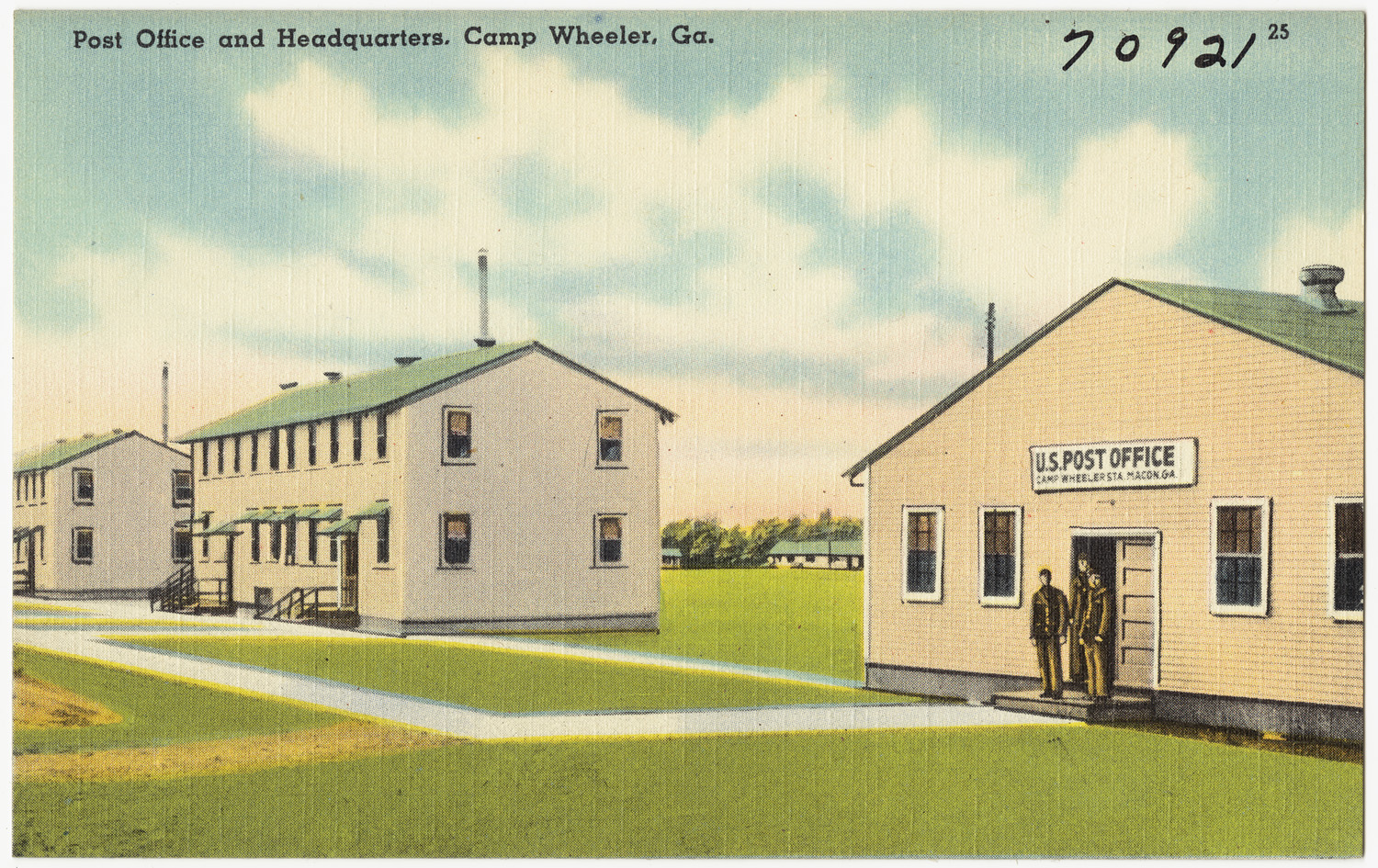
Camp Wheeler, Georgia (1930 to 1945)

Having enjoyed his work as a chaplain at Harrington Airfield, Kapaun in July 1944 asked Winkelmann for permission to enter the US Army Chaplain Corps. Kapaun entered the U.S. Army Chaplain School at Ft. Devens in Massachusetts in August 1944. After graduating in October 1944, he began his military chaplaincy as a first lieutenant at Camp Wheeler near Macon, Georgia. He was one of two chaplains ministering to approximately 19,000 servicemen and women.

The Army in April 1945 assigned Kapaun to India to serve in the China Burma India Theater against the Japanese Army. He was assigned as assistant chaplain to the 198th Ordinance Battalion. He ministered to American soldiers and at local missions in India, sometimes traversing nearly 2,000 miles (3,200 km) a month by jeep or airplane.

After the surrender of Japan in 1945, Kapaun was promoted to captain in January 1946. He was sent back to the United States that May. The Army discharged Kapaun from active duty in July 1946. Soon after Kapaun returned to Kansas, Winkelmann sent him to the Catholic University of America in Washington D.C. Kapaun's master's dissertation was titled "“A Study of the Accrediting of Religion in the High Schools of the United States.” He was awarded a Master of Arts degree in education in February 1948.

After Kapaun graduated Catholic University, he requested permission from Bishop Mark Kenny Carroll, the new bishop of Wichita, for permission to rejoin the Army. Instead, Carroll appointed Kapaun as pastor of Holy Trinity Parish in Timken, Kansas. Six months later, he again wrote to Carroll, saying that he felt his true calling was in ministering to soldiers. This time, Carroll agreed. In September 1948, Kapaun returned to active duty and was assigned as chaplain at the Anti-Aircraft Artillery Corps unit at Fort Bliss near El Paso, Texas. In December 1949, the Army transferred Kapaun to the 8th Cavalry Regiment, 1st Cavalry Division, stationed in Yokohama, Japan. He left the United States for the last time.

=== Korean War ===
==== Background ====
In June 1950, the Democratic People's Republic of Korea (North Korea) launched a massive invasion of the Republic of Korea (South Korea). North Korea was backed logistically by the People's Republic of China and the Soviet Union. Almost immediately, the ROK forces were in full retreat. Fearing a communist victory in South Korea, US President Harry S. Truman ordered the deployment of American troops, as part of a United Nations force, to stop the North Korean advance. On July 15, 1950, the 1st Cavalry Division embarked from Tokyo Bay for South Korea.

==== Pusan perimeter ====
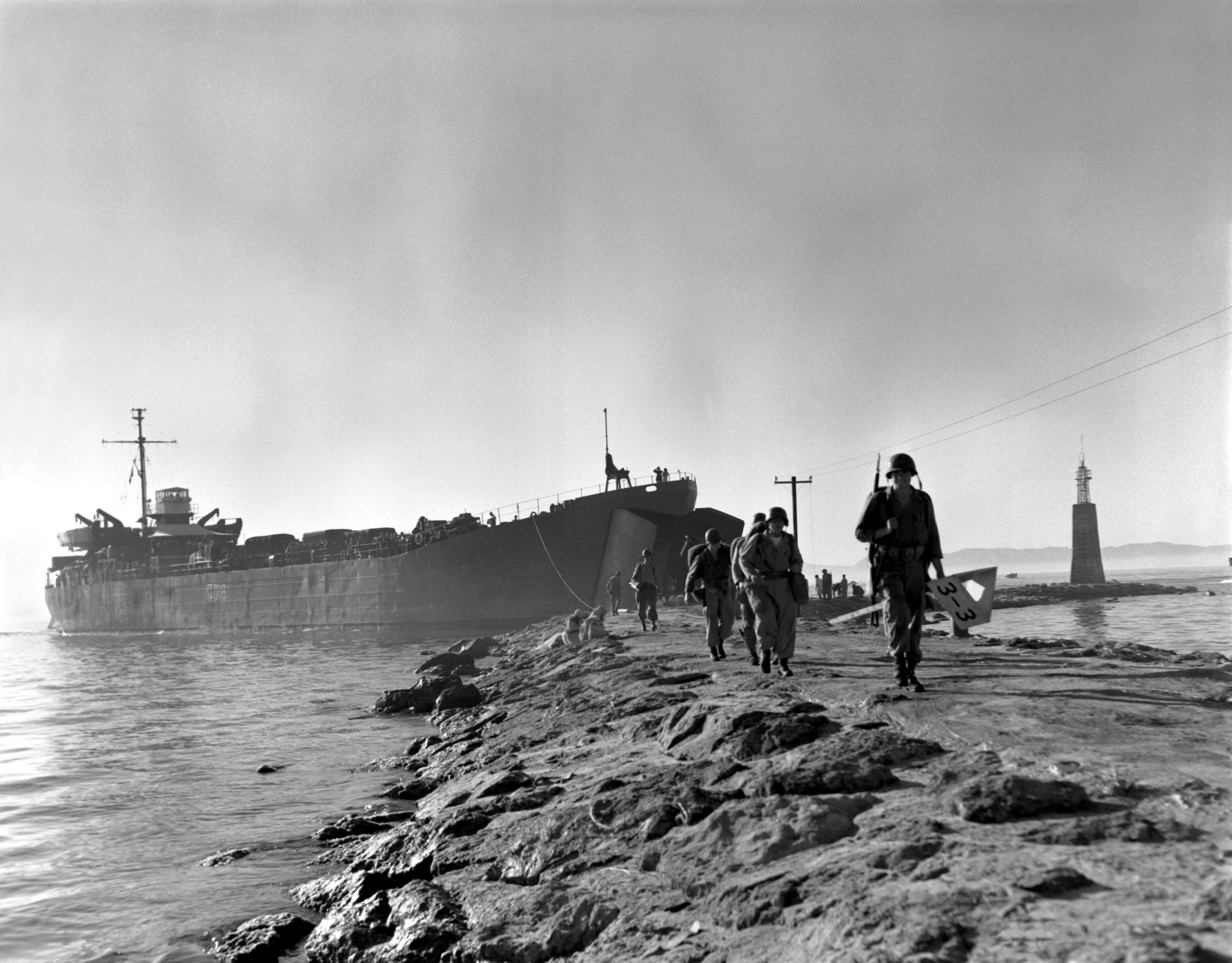
1st Cavalry Division arrives in South Korea July 1950

The 1st Cavalry Division landed in South Korea on July 18, 1950. It was quickly moved up to the front line, its mission to slow the southern advance of the Korean People's Army (KPA) until more American reinforcements could arrive. During the summer of 1950, the 1st Cavalry skirmished several times with the KPA, making a series of orderly retreats towards Pusan in the far south of the Korean Peninsula.

On August 2, Kapaun and his assistant rescued a wounded soldier stranded by enemy machine gun and small arms fire. Knowing that no litter bearers were available, the two men transported the man to safety while under enemy fire. Kapaun was awarded the Bronze Star Medal with a "V" device for valor. A humble person, Kapaun was annoyed that news of the rescue had been covered by the media in the United States.

By August 4, KPA had driven the UN forces back into a small perimeter around Pusan. However, the KPA was unable to make any further advances. Kapaun continued to make the rounds in the 8th Regiment to encourage the troops and pray with them. In his letters home, Kapaun's main complaint was the lack of sleep for several weeks.

==== Advance through North Korea ====
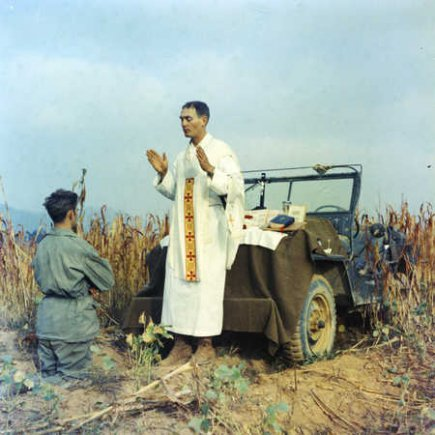
Kapaun celebrating mass using the jeep hood as his altar, near North Korea, October 7, 1950

On September 15, US General Douglas McArthur launched an amphibious landing at Inchon, South Korea, 210 miles (340 km) north of Pusan. Fearing encirclement by UN forces, the KPA fled Pusan. The UN forces broke out of the Pusan perimeter and pursued the KPA northward. On October 9, the 1st Cavalry crossed the 38th parallel into North Korea, capturing the capital of Pyongyang. The UN forces then advanced to within 50 miles (80 km) of the Chinese border.

Throughout the months of fighting, Kapaun gained a reputation for bravely serving the troops, rescuing the wounded and retrieving the dead. He baptised Korean children and heard confessions. Kapaun celebrated mass on an improvised altar set up on the front end of a Jeep. Several times his mass kit Jeep and trailer were destroyed by enemy fire. During one firefight, a bullet knocked his pipe out of his mouth. In letters home, he shared that he was thoroughly convinced other soldiers' prayers helped him survive.

==== Capture in battle ====
Fearing the collapse of North Korea and the specter of American troops on its border, China decided to intervene in the war. The first engagement with the People's Volunteer Army (PVA). was the two-day Battle of Unsan near Unsan, North Korea, on November 1 to 2, 1950. Nearly 20,000 PVA soldiers attacked Kapaun's 8th Cavalry Regiment, forcing them to retreat. At one point, while aiding the wounded, Kapaun was captured by PVA soldiers, but was rescued by his comrades. The 800 soldiers of the 3rd Battalion were tasked with covering the regiment's retreat. Kapaun braved enemy fire and rescued nearly 40 men; he later received the Congressional Medal of Honor for these actions The US 5th Cavalry Regiment attempted several times to rescue the beleaguered 3rd Battalion, but was unsuccessful.

Despite pleas for Kapaun to evacuate, he chose to remain with them. Throughout the battle, Kapaun was tending the wounding and giving encouragement to the troops still fighting. On November 2, he noticed that a wounded PVA officer was in the battalion camp. Seeing that the remains of the battalion was facing slaughter, Kapaun convinced the officer to negotiate a surrender.

==== Prisoner of war camp ====
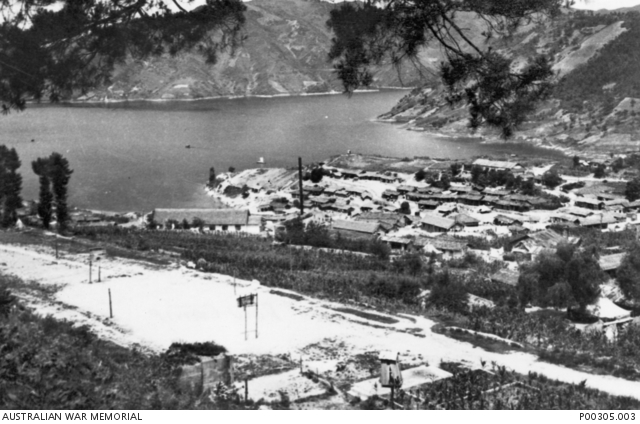
Prison Camp #5, Pyoktong

The American POWs were marched 87 miles (140 km) to a temporary prison camp at Sombakol. This was near the permanent camp (Prison Camp 5) at Pyoktong in North Korea, where they were later held. Kapaun was able to persuade some prisoners, who had ignored orders from their officers, to carry the wounded. A KPA soldier was ready to shoot a wounded POW who couldn't walk, but Kapaun pushed the rifle aside and picked up the man.

At Prison Camp 5, up to two dozen men died each day from malnutrition, disease, lice, or the extreme cold. Kapaun dug latrines, gathered woods for fires for the wounded, mediated disputes between the POWS, gave his food to other POWS and attempted to raise their morale. His fellow POWs noted that Kapaun would steal food for the men. He also stood up to communist indoctrination by his captors, smuggled dysentery drugs to the doctor, Sidney Esensten, and led the POWs in prayer. Kapaun ministered to all the POWs in the camp, including the Protestant, Jewish and Muslim ones.

==== Death ====
In the winter of 1951, Kapaun developed a blood clot in one of his legs, in addition to having dysentery and pneumonia. Weakening as the months passed, he was still able to lead an Easter sunrise service on March 25, 1951.

The camp guards finally took the dying Kapaun to a place in Camp 5 they called the "hospital', which in reality a hut in which men died on floor. Kapaun died there of malnutrition and pneumonia on May 23, 1951.

==== Burial, repatriation and identification ====
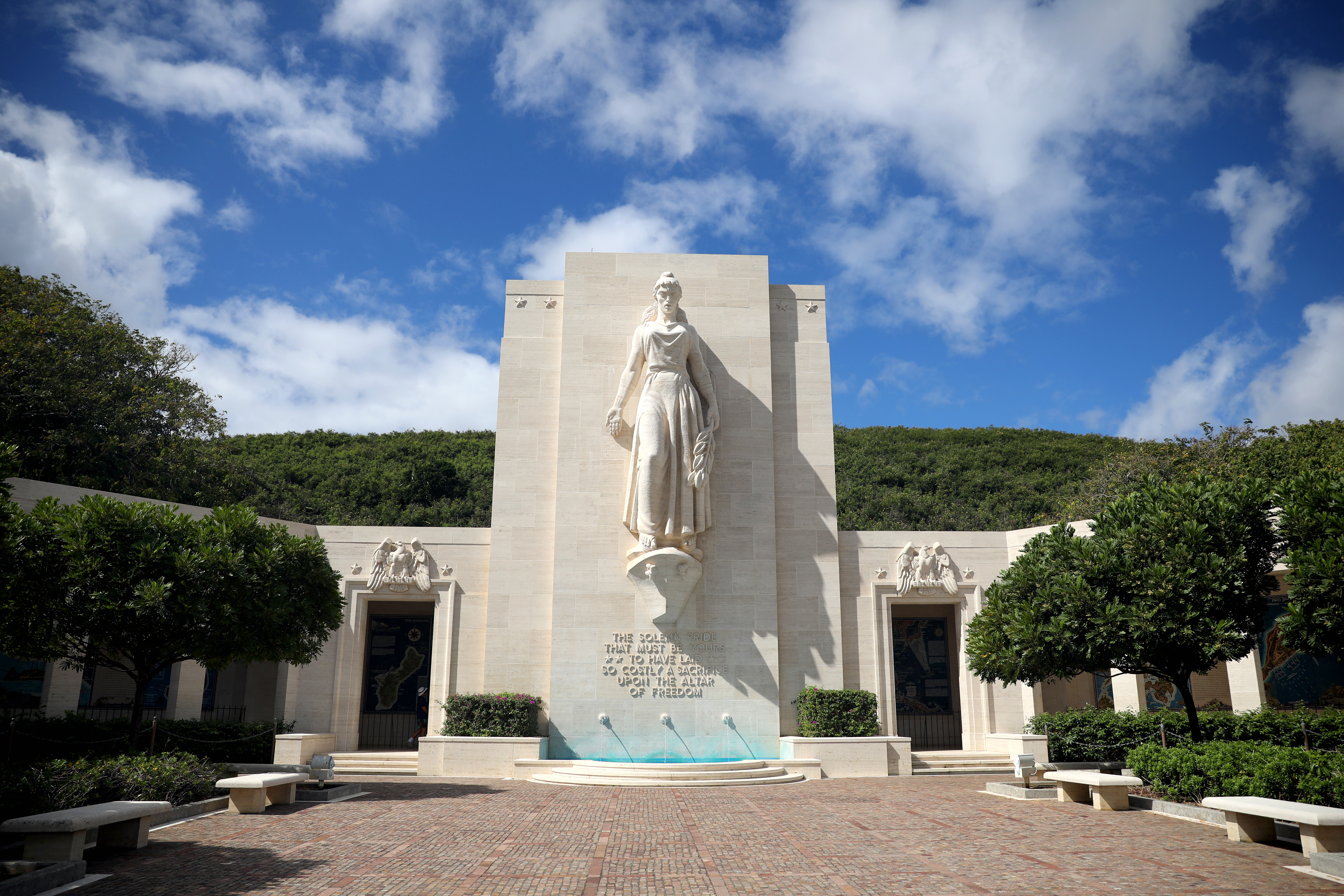
National Memorial Cemetery of the Pacific, Honolulu

The former POWS at Camp 5 originally reported that the guards buried Kapaun in a mass grave near the Yalu River. However, in 2005, former POW William Hansen said he and other POWs had buried Kapaun in a single grave on higher ground, marking the gravesite with stones. Kapaun was one of twelve chaplains to die in Korea. Four Army chaplains were taken prisoner in 1950, all of whom died in captivity.

With the signing of the Korean Armistice Agreement in 1953, hostilities ended in Korea. In keeping with the terms of this agreement, North Korea in 1954 returned 1,868 unidentified remains of America soldiers to the Army as part of Operation Glory. However, the technology did not exist then to identify them. All the remains were buried at the National Memorial Cemetery of the Pacific (NMCP) in Honolulu, Hawaii, around 1956.

With the advent of advanced DNA technology in the 21st century, it became possible to identify the Korean war remains. In 2018, the Defense POW/MIA Accounting Agency began its Korean War Disinterment Project, a seven-phase plan to disinter and identify all the remaining unidentified remains in at the NMCP. On March 4, 2021, Kansas U.S. senator Jerry Moran and the Catholic Diocese of Wichita confirmed that the Department of Defense had identified Kapaun's remains.

On September 29, 2021, a Mass of Christian Burial was held for Kapaun at the Hartman Arena in Park City, Kansas. A horse-drawn caisson then carried his remains to the Cathedral of the Immaculate Conception in Wichita, where he was buried with full military honors inside the cathedral.

== Citations ==
=== Medal of Honor ===
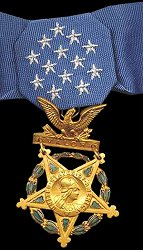
Medal of Honor

On August 18, 1951, the Army posthumously awarded the Distinguished Service Cross to Kapaun for extraordinary action in the Battle of Unsan in November 1950. However, his fellow soldiers and POWs felt that he deserved the Medal of Honor. In 2001, Kansas U.S. Representative Todd Tiahrt began a lobbying the Army to approve it for him. Before leaving office in September 2009, Secretary of the Army Pete Geren sent Tiahrt a letter, agreeing that Kapaun should receive the Medal of Honor. Admiral Michael Mullen, Chairman of the Joint Chiefs of Staff, also agreed.

The National Defense Authorization Act for fiscal year 2012 contained an authorization and a request to the president to upgrade Kapaun's Distinguished Service Cross to the Medal of Honor for acts of bravery during the Battle of Unsan and while a prisoner of war. President Barack Obama presented the Medal of Honor to Kapaun's nephew in a White House ceremony on April 11, 2013.

Kapaun's Medal of Honor citation reads:

The President of the United States of America, authorized by Act of Congress, March 3, 1863, has awarded in the name of Congress the MEDAL OF HONOR to

CHAPLAIN (CAPTAIN) EMIL. J, KAPAUN
UNITED STATES ARMY

for conspicuous gallantry and intrepidity at the risk of his life above and beyond the call of duty:

Chaplain Emil J. KAPAUN distinguished himself by acts of gallantry and intrepidity above and beyond the call of duty while serving with the 3rd Battalion, 8th Cavalry Regiment, 1st Cavalry Division during combat operations against an armed enemy at Unsan, Korea, from November 1–2, 1950. On November 1, as Chinese Communist Forces viciously attacked friendly elements, Chaplain KAPAUN calmly walked through withering enemy fire in order to provide comfort and medical aid to his comrades and rescue friendly wounded from no-man's land. Though the Americans successfully repelled the assault, they found themselves surrounded by the enemy. Facing annihilation, the able-bodied men were ordered to evacuate. However, Chaplain KAPAUN, fully aware of his certain capture, elected to stay behind with the wounded. After the enemy succeeded in breaking through the defense in the early morning hours of November 2, Chaplain KAPAUN continually made rounds, as hand-to-hand combat ensued. As Chinese Communist Forces approached the American position, Chaplain KAPAUN noticed an injured Chinese officer among the wounded and convinced him to negotiate the safe surrender of the American Forces. Shortly after his capture, Chaplain KAPAUN, with complete disregard for his personal safety and unwavering resolve, bravely pushed aside an enemy soldier preparing to execute Sergeant First Class Herbert A. Miller. Not only did Chaplain KAPAUN'S gallantry save the life of Sergeant Miller, but also his unparalleled courage and leadership inspired all those present, including those who might have otherwise fled in panic, to remain and fight the enemy until captured. Chaplain KAPAUN'S extraordinary heroism and selflessness, above and beyond the call of duty, are in keeping with the highest traditions of military service and reflect great credit upon himself, the 3rd Battalion, 8th Cavalry Regiment, the 1st Cavalry Division, and the United States Army.

Barack Obama

=== Legion of Merit ===
The Legion of Merit is awarded not primarily for heroism, but for exceptionally meritorious service in some other capacity. It was awarded to Kapaun in recognition for his extraordinary actions as a POW, even while sick and suffering himself.

The President of the United States of America, authorized by Act of Congress July 20, 1942, has awarded the Legion of Merit, posthumously, to

CHAPLAIN (CAPTAIN) EMIL. J, KAPAUN, USA

for exceptionally meritorious conduct in the performance of outstanding services:

Chaplain (Captain) Emil J. Kapaun, Chaplains, United States Army, a member of the 8th Cavalry Regiment, 1st Cavalry Division, distinguished himself by exceptionally meritorious service while a prisoner of war at Pyoktong, Korea, from November 4, 1950, to May 23, 1951. Though seriously ill during the entire period of his internment, he continuously and unselfishly cared for fellow prisoners, sought food and clothing and daily conducted Catholic and general services under exceptionally difficult circumstances. By his material assistance to interned doctors, and through the unhesitating performance of the most menial tasks, the death rate in the camp was held at a rate far lower than another nearby camp under similar conditions. Chaplain Kapaun's spiritual guidance assisted many to defy communist instructions and maintain the hope necessary to remain alive, and physically and mentally to withstand Communists' brutalities. Chaplain Kapaun's outstanding religious and humanitarian activities and determination of purpose resulted in a marked benefit to other internees reflecting great credit upon himself and the military service.

— Legion of Merit Citation, Official Military Personnel File for Emil J. Kapaun, p. 587 https://catalog.archives.gov/id/57289559

=== Bronze Star ===
Kapaun was awarded the Bronze Star Medal with "V" Device on September 2, 1950, for his actions on August 2, 1950:

HEADQUARTERS 1ST CAVALRY DIVISION
September 2, 1950

AWARD OF THE BRONZE STAR MEDAL – By direction of the President under the provisions of Executive Order 9419, and pursuant to the authority contained in AR-600-45, the Bronze Star Medal with "V" Device for heroic achievement in connection with military operations against an enemy of the United States is awarded the following named officer:

CHAPLAIN (CAPTAIN) EMIL J. KAPAUN 0558217, CHAPLAIN CORPS, UNITED STATES ARMY, a member of Headquarters and Headquarters Company, 8th Cavalry Regiment, 1st Cavalry Regiment, displayed heroism in action against the enemy near Kumchung, Korea on August 2, 1950. Chaplain KAPAUN received information that there was a wounded man in an exposed position on the left flank of the first battalion that could not be removed as there were no litter bearers available. Chaplain KAPAUN, together with another officer, immediately proceeded to the front lines, where he contacted the Battalion Commander in order to obtain the approximate location of the wounded man. With total disregard for personal safety, Chaplain KAPAUN and his companion went after the wounded man. The entire route to the wounded soldier was under intense enemy machinegun and small arms fire. However, Chaplain KAPAUN successfully evacuated the soldier, thereby saving the soldier. This heroic action on the part of Chaplain KAPAUN reflects great credit on himself and the military.

BY COMMAND OF MAJOR GENERAL GAY

=== Taegeuk Order of Military Merit (Republic of Korea) ===
Kapaun was awarded the Taegeuk Order of Military Merit by President Moon Jae-in on behalf of the Republic of Korea on July 27, 2021. This is the highest military recognition awarded by South Korea.

== Awards and decorations ==
Kapaun's Distinguished Service Cross was upgraded by the Army to the Medal of Honor on April 11, 2013. He was awarded the following U.S and foreign military awards:

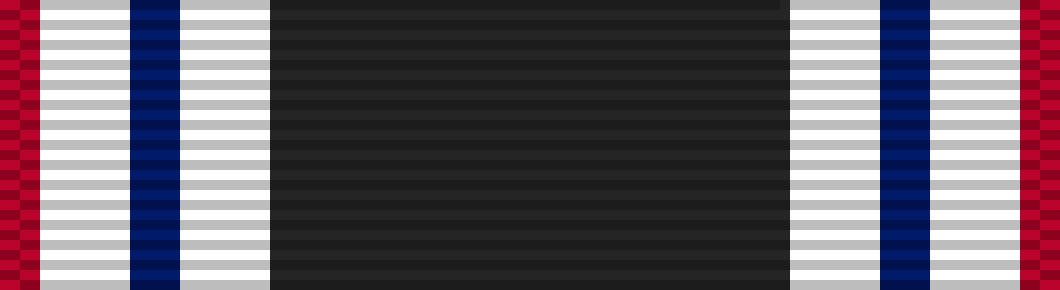

1st row	Medal of Honor Upgraded from Distinguished Service Cross in 2012		Legion of Merit
2nd row	Bronze Star Medal with "V" Device	Purple Heart	Prisoner of War Medal Retroactively Awarded, 1986
3rd row	American Campaign Medal	Asiatic-Pacific Campaign Medal with 1 Campaign star	World War II Victory Medal
4th row	Army of Occupation Medal with 'Japan' clasp	National Defense Service Medal	Korean Service Medal with 2 Campaign stars
3rd row	United Nations Service Medal Korea	Korean War Service Medal Retroactively Awarded, 2003	Order of Military Merit Taeguk Cordon Medal
	Presidential Unit Citation	Korean Presidential Unit Citation	

== Veneration ==
=== Cause for canonization ===
Soon after Kapaun's death, his actions in Korea became public knowledge. Many Catholics began to offer devotional prayers to him; these prayers came from American service members, laymen and women across the United States, as well as from Catholics in East and Southeast Asia.

The Archdiocese of the Military Services, which had jurisdiction for all Catholics in the armed forces, petitioned the Vatican to declare Kapaun a Servant of God. Pope John Paul II named him a Servant of God that same year, the Vatican's first step toward possible canonization. In 2008, the cause for Kapaun's canonization was officially opened on Father Kapaun Day, held at St. John Nepomucene Catholic Church in Pilsen. In 2009, Andrea Ambrosi, the postulator for Kapaun's cause, arrived in Wichita to interview doctors about two possible miracles.

In 2015, the bishop of Wichita, Carl A. Kemme, presented the positio, a 1,066-page-long report on Kapaun's life, ministry, virtues, holiness, and other aspects, to Cardinal Angelo Amato, the cardinal prefect of the Congregation for the Causes of Saints (CCS) at the Vatican, for review.

A Vatican team of six historians in 2016 voiced their approval of the Kapaun cause. In 2022, John Hotze, the chief investigator for Kapaun's cause for canonization, announced that the Vatican was considering whether to declare Kapaun a martyr. However, the Vatican decided not to designate him as such In 2025, Kapaun was declared Venerable by Pope Francis.

=== Gerleman case ===
In 2006, 12-year-old Avery Gerleman was playing in a soccer match in Wichita when she suddenly started coughing blood. Her parents immediately took her to Wesley Children's Hospital, where she continued to deteriorate. Her doctors diagnosed her with an auto-immune disorder that was causing her kidney failure. Gerleman was put on a ventilator in a drug-induced coma and started on kidney dialysis. Due to her kidney damage, the prognosis for Gerleman was poor.

The girl's parents asked the congregation in her parish to pray to Kapaun for his intercession. The members of Gerleman's soccer team, both Catholic and non-Catholic, starting praying the rosary and asking for his intercession. Five weeks after experiencing kidney failure, they started showing function again. She was brought out of the coma, taken off the ventilator, and began a long slow recovery. Later scans of her damaged lungs and kidneys showed no signs of scarring. When interviewed by Ambrosi, Gerleman's two doctors, both Protestants, stated that her recovery was miraculous.

=== Kear case ===
Chase Kear from Colwich, Kansas, was a 20-year-old student in 2008 at Hutchinson Community College in Hutchinson, Kansas. While practising pole vault for the track team one afternoon, he missed the mat and fell on his head, suffering a several brain trauma. He was rushed to Via Christi Regional Medical Center in Wichita. Doctors told the Kear family that he prognosis was very poor. The family requested the congregation of their parish, Sacred Heart in Colwich, pray to Kapaun to intercede in Kear's recovery. The family also placed a Kapaun prayer card on Kear's bed. Kear made a miraculous recovery.

=== Dellasega case ===
On May 7, 2011, 26-year-old Nick Dellasega collapsed during a 5K race in Pittsburg, Kansas. His uncle, a doctor, performed CPR on Dellasega and defibrillated him using an Automated External Defibrillator (AED). While this was going on, Dellasega's cousin Josh knelt next to him on the pavement and prayed to Kapaun for his intercession to save him. Delleaga was revived and survived the episode.

== Legacy ==
Arthur Tonne in his book Chaplain Kapaun: Patriot Priest of the Korean Conflict said this about Kapaun:

In a very definite sense, we are all beneficiaries from the life of Fr. Kapaun. He has left us a stirring example of devotion to duty. He has passed on to us a spirit of tolerance and understanding. He has given us a share of dauntless bravery – of body and soul. He has transmitted to every one of us a new appreciation of America and a keener, more realistic understanding of our country's greatest enemy – godlessness, now stalking the world in the form of communism. He has bequeathed a picture of Christ-like life. What Fr. Kapaun willed to us cannot be contained in memorials, however costly or beautiful. It is a treasure for the human soul – the spirit of one who loved and served God and man – even unto death.

=== Memorials ===
- Chaplain Kapaun Korean War Memorial Site, Pilsen; dedicated 2001.
- Chaplains Memorial; The Medal of Honor Grove, Freedoms Foundation, Valley Forge, Pennsylvania; Induction 2014
- Granite monument, U.S. Army Garrison Daegu, Daegu, South Korea; unveiling 2014
- Honolulu Memorial, National Memorial Cemetery of the Pacific, Honolulu; dedicated 1964
- Kapaun Memorial Chapel; Seoul, South Korea; dedicated 1953.
- Memorial tablet, Kansas Korean War Memorial wall, Overland Park, Kansas; dedicated 2014.

=== Named places ===
- Bronze door panel, Cathedral of the Immaculate Conception, Wichita; dedicated 1997.
- Chaplain Emil Kapaun Chapel, U.S. Army Garrison Humphreys, South Korea; dedicated 2025
- Chaplain Kapaun Memorial High School, Wichita, Kansas; dedicated 1957. Became the Kapaun Mt. Carmel Catholic High School in 1971.
- Father Kapaun Memorial Technical School, Kwanju, Korea; dedicated 1955.
- Kapaun Air Station and Chapel, Kaiserslautern Military Community, Kaiserslautern, Germany; dedicated1955.
- Kapaun Chapel, Camp McGovern, Bosnia and Herzegovina; dedicated 1998.
- Kapaun Chapel, Fort Riley, Kansas; dedicated 2001, 2002.
- Kapaun Religious Retreat House, Ōiso, Japan; dedicated 1954.

=== Knights of Columbus councils and assemblies ===
- Chaplain Emil J. Kapaun Knights of Columbus Council #14218 Fort Riley
- Chaplain Emil J. Kapaun Knights of Columbus Council #3423, Pilsen
- Emil Kapaun Knights of Columbus Fourth Degree Assembly #2721; Katy, Texas
- Father Emil Kapaun Council 3744, Playa del Rey, California
- Father Emil J. Kapaun Assembly #3260 Vail, Arizona
- Fr. Emil Kapaun Assembly #3274 Paoli, Pennsylvania
- Fr. Emil Kapaun Assembly #3826 Pearl, Mississippi
- Fr. Emil Kapaun Council #12965 Oak Grove Kentucky
- Fr. Emil J. Kapaun Council #11987, Ramstein Air Base, Ramstein, Germany

== Kapaun's Men ==
In 2015, several men formed Kapaun's Men, a movement that seeks to continue Kapaun's legacy of encouraging men to accompany one another in faith. The group produced a documentary life of Kapaun, several video series, and for a time hosted a weekly podcast called The Foxhole.

== TV portrayal ==
Kapaun was portrayed by James Whitmore in the Crossroads TV episode "The Good Thief", which aired on November 25, 1955.

== See also ==
- Four Chaplains
- List of Chaplain Corps Medal of Honor recipients
- List of Korean War Medal of Honor recipients
- Archdiocese for the Military Services
- American Catholic Servants of God, Venerables, Beatified, and Saints
