= Sir Francis Hamilton, 3rd Baronet =

Sir Francis Hamilton, 3rd Baronet (c.1640 – 4 February 1714) was an Anglo-Irish politician.

Hamilton was the son of Sir Charles Hamilton, 2nd Baronet, of Castle Hamilton and in 1689 he succeeded to his father's baronetcy. He was the Member of Parliament for County Cavan in the Irish House of Commons between 1661 and 1666, before representing the seat again from 1692 until his death in 1714. Upon his death, his title became either extinct or dormant.

Parliament of Ireland
Preceded by Philip O'Reilly; Robert Bailey	Member of Parliament for County Cavan; 1661–1666; With: Thomas Coote	Succeeded by Philip Reyley; John Reyly
Preceded by Philip Reyley; John Reyly	Member of Parliament for County Cavan; 1692–1714; With: Robert Saunderson (1692–1696); Francis White (1697–1703); Theophilus Butler (1703–1713); Robert Saunderson (1714–1714)	Succeeded by Mervyn Pratt; Brockhill Newburgh
Baronetage of Nova Scotia
Preceded by Charles Hamilton	Baronet (of Killock); 1689–1714	Extinct or dormant
