= John Joseph Hennessy =

Irish-born prelate

His Excellency, The Right Reverend John Joseph Hennessy D D.
- Bishop of Wichita
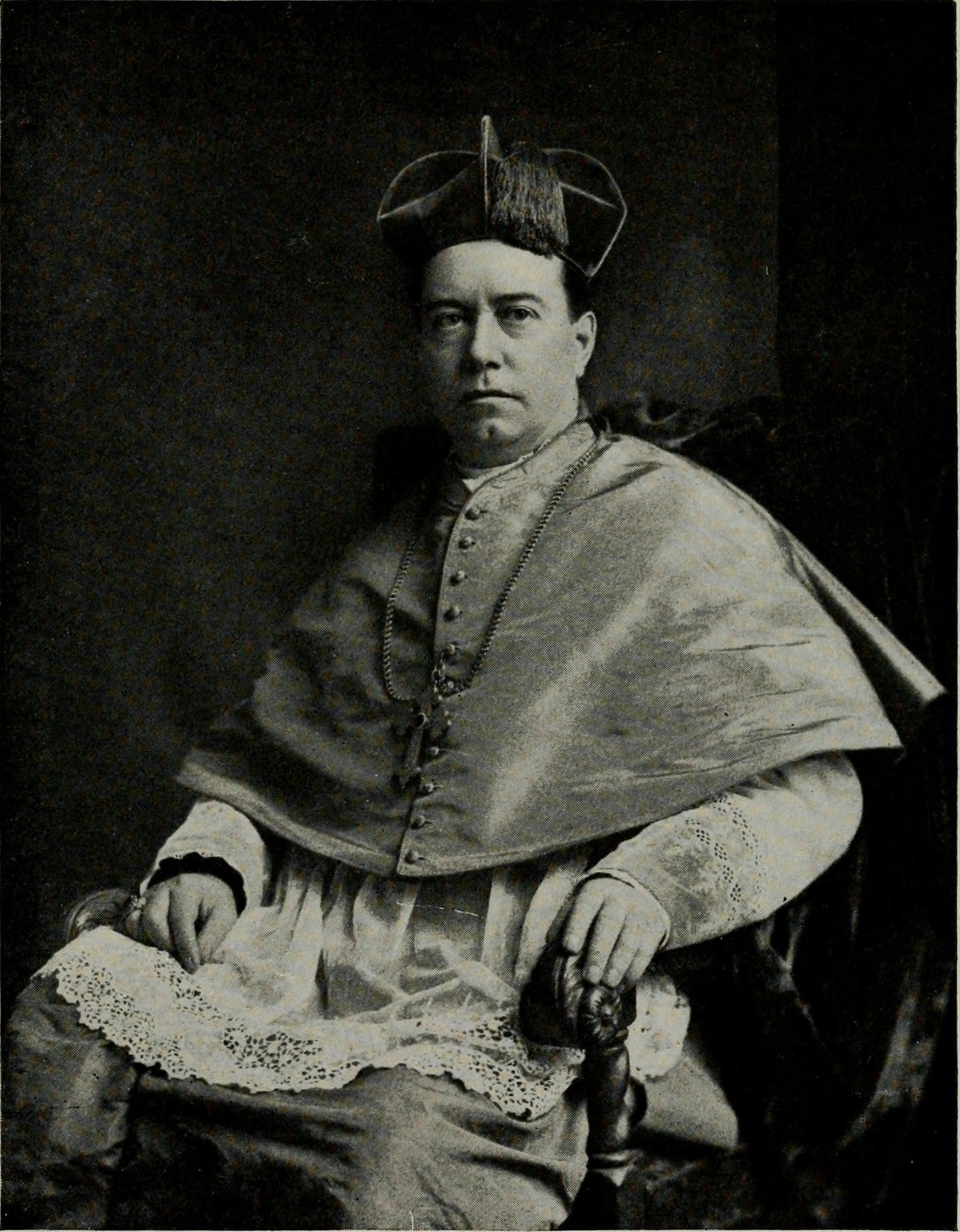
- Appointed: February 11, 1888
- In office: Diocese of Wichita
- Successor: Augustus John Schwertner

Orders
- Ordination: November 27, 1869 by Joseph Machebeuf
- Consecration: November 30, 1888 by Peter Kenrick

Personal details
- Born: July 19, 1847 Cloyne, Ireland
- Died: July 13, 1920 (aged 72) Wichita, Kansas, US
- Denomination: Roman Catholic
- Parents: Michael and Ellen (Cronin) Hennessy
- Education: Christian Brothers College High School; St. Vincent's Seminary; Saint Francis de Sales Seminary of Milwaukee
- Motto: Caritas et pax (Love and peace)

John Joseph Hennessy (July 19, 1847 – July 13, 1920) was an Irish-born prelate of the Roman Catholic Church. He served as the first bishop of the new Diocese of Wichita in Kansas from 1888 until his death in 1920.

== Biography ==
=== Early life ===
John Hennessy was born on July 19, 1847, near Cloyne, County Cork, in Ireland to Michael and Ellen (née Cronin) Hennessy. In 1850, the Hennessy family immigrated to the United States, settling in St. Louis, Missouri. He received his early education at the local cathedral school and the Christian Brothers College in Town and Country, Missouri, graduating there in 1862. Hennessy completed his theological studies at St. Francis Seminary in Milwaukee, Wisconsin, and his philosophical studies at St. Vincent College in Cape Girardeau, Missouri.

=== Priesthood ===
Hennessy was ordained to the priesthood in St. Louis by Bishop Joseph Machebeuf for the Archdiocese of St. Louis on November 28, 1869. At age 22, he was below the age required for ordination, but was granted a dispensation by Pope Pius IX.

After his ordination, the archdiocese assigned Hennessy as pastor of a parish in Iron Mountain, Missouri, with his jurisdiction extending as far south as Arkansas. Over the next few years, he erected churches in Missouri at Bismarck, Doniphan, Poplar Bluff, Gatewood, Graniteville, and Farmington. Hennessy established the Catholic Railroad Men's Benevolent Union in 1871, a convent for the Ursuline Sisters at Arcadia, Missouri, in 1877, and the first total abstinence society in southeast Missouri.

In 1878, Hennessy was elected procurator and vice-president of the Catholic Protectory for Boys at Glencoe, Missouri. He was named rector of St. John's Church in St. Louis in 1880. That same year, he became editor of the St. Louis Youths' Magazine and in 1882 secretary of the St. Louis Orphan Board. He also served as treasurer of the diocesan clergy fund and spiritual director of the St. Vincent de Paul Society.

=== Bishop of Wichita ===
On February 11, 1888, Hennessy was appointed the first bishop of the newly erected Diocese of Wichita by Pope Leo XIII. He was technically the second Bishop of Wichita, as Reverend James O'Reilly had been appointed as bishop in 1887, but he died before his consecration. Hennessy was consecrated at St. John's Church in St. Louis on November 30, 1888, by Archbishop Peter Kenrick, with Archbishop John Hennessy and Bishop Louis Fink serving as co-consecrators.

In 1890, Hennessy persuaded the Sisters of the Sorrowful Mother to come to Kansas and take over management of St. Francis Hospital in Wichita. In 1898 he convened the first diocesan synod. He broke ground for the Cathedral of the Immaculate Conception in Wichita in April 1906 and laid the cornerstone the following October; it was dedicated by Cardinal James Gibbons in September 1912. Between 1891 and 1898, Hennessy also served as apostolic administrator of the Diocese of Concordia in Kansas.

=== Death ===
On July 13, 1920, Hennessy suffered a stroke and died in Wichita a few hours later. He was interred in the Cathedral of the Immaculate Conception.

Catholic Church titles
Preceded by none	Bishop of Wichita; 1888–1920	Succeeded by Augustus John Schwertner
