= Robert Saunderson (County Cavan MP) =

Irish politician (1653–1724)

Robert Saunderson (1653 – 28 March 1724) was an Irish politician.

Saunderson was first elected to the Irish House of Commons as the Member of Parliament for County Cavan in 1692. He was chosen to represent the seat again in 1695. On 27 June 1696, Saunderson was expelled from the Commons in a unanimous vote for having failed to sign the Association of 1696. Saunderson remained out of parliament until he was elected to represent County Cavan in the 1713 Irish general election, holding the seat until the following year.

Parliament of Ireland
Preceded by Philip Reyley; John Reyly	Member of Parliament for County Cavan with Sir Francis Hamilton, Bt; 1692–1696	Succeeded by Sir Francis Hamilton, Bt; Francis White
Preceded by Sir Francis Hamilton, Bt; Conway Richard Dobbs	Member of Parliament for County Cavan with Sir Francis Hamilton, Bt; 1713–1714	Succeeded by Mervyn Pratt; Brockhill Newburgh
