= Hamilton baronets of Killock (1628) =

The Hamilton baronetcy, of Killock in the County of Down (according to some sources the territorial designation was "of Killaugh in the County of Cavan"), was created in the Baronetage of Nova Scotia on 29 September 1628 for Francis Hamilton. He represented Jamestown and County Cavan in the Irish House of Commons. His son, the 2nd Baronet, was a Member of the Irish Parliament for County Donegal, and was succeeded by his son, the 3rd Baronet. He, too, represented County Cavan in the Irish Parliament. The title became either extinct or dormant on his death in 1714.

== Hamilton baronets, of Killock (1628) ==
- Sir Francis Hamilton, 1st Baronet (died 1673)
- Sir Charles Hamilton, 2nd Baronet (died c. 1689)
- Sir Francis Hamilton, 3rd Baronet (c. 1637 – 1714)
