= Augustus John Schwertner =

American prelate

His Excellency, The Most Reverend Augustus John Schwertner
- Bishop of Wichita
- Church: Catholic Church
- Diocese: Diocese of Wichita
- Appointed: March 10, 1921
- Term ended: October 2, 1939 (his death)
- Predecessor: John Joseph Hennessy
- Successor: Christian Herman Winkelmann

Orders
- Ordination: June 12, 1897 by Ignatius Frederick Horstmann
- Consecration: June 8, 1921 by Joseph Schrembs

Personal details
- Born: December 23, 1870 Canton, Ohio, U.S.
- Died: October 2, 1939 (aged 68) Wichita, Kansas, U.S.
- Education: Canisius College; Saint Mary Seminary
- Motto: Fiat voluntas tua (Thy will be done)

Augustus John Schwertner (December 23, 1870 – October 2, 1939) was an American prelate of the Catholic Church. He served as bishop of the Diocese of Wichita in Kansas from 1921 until his death in 1939.

== Biography ==
=== Early life and education ===
Augustus Schwertner was born on December 23, 1870, in Canton, Ohio, the second of eight children of Anton and Christina (née Richart) Schwertner. His father was an Austrian immigrant who worked as a shoemaker. The family were parishioners at St. Peter's Parish in Canton, where Schwertner received his early education at the local parochial school.

After graduating from the public high school in Canton, Schwertner studied under the Jesuits at Canisius College in Buffalo, New York. He entered St. Mary's Seminary in Cleveland, Ohio, in 1891 to study for the priesthood. His brother Benedict also became a priest, joining the Dominican Order and taking the religious name Thomas Maria.

=== Priesthood ===
Schwertner was ordained a priest for the Diocese of Cleveland on June 12, 1897 by Bishop Ignatius Horstmann. Schwertner celebrated his first mass at his childhood parish, St. Peter's in Canton. He then served for a few months as assistant pastor at St. Columba's Parish in Youngstown, Ohio. In 1897, he was named pastor of St. Anthony's Parish in Milan, Ohio. Schwertner was transferred in 1903 to Rockport, Ohio, where he served as pastor of St. Mary's Parish.In 1907, Schwertner was appointed pastor of St. John's Parish in Lima, Ohio.

Schwertner was incardinated, or transferred, to the newly-erected Diocese of Toledo in Ohio in 1910. In 1913, Schwertner was appointed chancellor of the new diocese by Bishop Joseph Schrembs, placing him in charge of the diocese's business and financial affairs. He received the title of monsignor from Pope Benedict XV in 1916.

=== Bishop of Wichita ===
On March 10, 1921, Schwertner was appointed bishop of Wichita by Benedict XV. He received his episcopal consecration on June 8, 1921, in Toledo at the Cathedral of Saint Francis de Sales from Schrembs, with Bishops Michael Gallagher and John Tihen serving as co-consecrators. He took charge of the Diocese of Wichita on June 22, 1921, when he was installed at the Cathedral of the Immaculate Conception in Wichita.

When Schwertner arrived in Wichita in 1921, the diocese contained 110 priests, 81 parishes, 49 parochial schools, and eight hospitals to serve a Catholic population of 36,905. By his final year as bishop in 1939, there were 56,248 Catholics, 155 priests, 97 parishes, 65 parochial schools, and 13 hospitals. Sacred Heart Junior College in Wichita was established during his tenure in 1933. It is today Newman University.

=== Death ===
John Schwertner died from a stroke at his residence in Wichita on October 2, 1939, at age 68. He is buried at Calvary Cemetery in Wichita.

Catholic Church titles
Preceded by John Joseph Hennessy	Bishop of Wichita; 1921–1939	Succeeded by Christian Herman Winkelmann
