= Philip Og O'Reilly =

Irish politician (c. 1640–1703)

Philip Og O'Reilly (c. 1640–1703) was an MP for Cavan in the Parliament of Ireland of 1689.

== Early life ==
His name in Gaelic was Pilib Óg O'Raghallaigh. He was probably called Pilib Óg (Young Philip) to distinguish him from Philip Reyley who represented County Cavan as an MP in the same Patriot Parliament. His ancestry was Phillip Óg mac Aodh Buidhe mac Maol Mordha Ruadh mac Phillip Dubh mac Aodh Conallach O'Raghallaigh, of whom the latter two ancestors were both Lords of East Breifne and chiefs of the O'Reilly clan. Philip Og's mother was Jane Betagh, probably from Moynalty, Barony of Kells Lower, County Meath, who married his father some time before November 1641. In the Irish 1641 rebellion, Philip's father was a captain of the rebels and is referred to in the 1641 Depositions as "Captain Hugh McMulmore O'Rely of Killyvaghan, Shercock", so it is likely Philip was born in Killyvaghan, Shercock, County Cavan. Philip Og had a younger brother Aodh Óg O'Raghallaigh.

== Career ==
Reyley was probably the Philip Reilly junior who was elected a member of Cavan Corporation on 23 February 1688. In the Patriot Parliament of 1689, Philip Og was elected to represent the Borough of Cavan along with Hugh Reily. After the defeat of King James II of England by King William III of England, Philip Og was outlawed by the new government. His name appears in the 1689 list of Cavan Jacobites outlawed for treason as "Philip Oge Reily, Reary, gent" (Reary is probably the townland of Raragh, Kinscourt, Co. Cavan). It is likely Philip fled the country to France along with most of the other outlaws.

== Death ==
Philip Og O'Reilly died early in 1703 and is probably buried in France. He left at least two sons, Maol Mordha O'Reilly and Friar Sean O'Reilly. Poem XXIII in James Carney's 'Poems on the O'Reillys' was written to commemorate his death by the author Fr. Thomas O'Clery, parish priest of Killann, Barony of Clankee, County Cavan.
