= Sir Francis Hamilton, 1st Baronet, of Killock =

Irish baronet (1606–1673)

Francis Hamilton
- Baronet of Killock
- Tenure: 1628–1673
- Successor: Charles Hamilton
- Born: 1606
- Died: 1673 (aged 66–67)
- Spouses: 1. Laetitia Coote; 2. Elizabeth Barlow
- Issue Detail: Charles & others
- Father: Claud Hamilton of Clonyn
- Mother: Janet Lauder

Sir Francis Hamilton, 1st Baronet, of Killock (1606–1673), also called of Castle Hamilton and of Killeshandra, was an Irish landowner and Member of the Irish Parliaments of 1640–1649 and 1661–1666.

== Birth and origins ==
Francis was born in 1606, the eldest son of Claud Hamilton of Clonyn and his wife Janet Lauder. His father was the second son of Alexander Hamilton of Innerwick in Scotland. Francis was called "of Creichness" in Scotland and "of Clonyn" (County Cavan) in Ireland. Francis's mother was a daughter of Maurice Lauder, M.P., & Baillie Burgess of Dunbar in Haddingtonshire, Scotland by his third wife Alison Cass.

Family tree

Francis Hamilton with his two wives, his parents, and other selected relatives. (Note: This family tree is based on genealogies of the Hamilton baronets (1628).)

Alexander; Hamilton of Innerwick
Charles; Coote; 1st Baronet; 1581–1642	Claud; Hamilton of Clonyn d. 1618	Janet; Lauder
Laetitia; Coote d. bef. 1640	Francis; 1st Baronet; 1606–1673	Elizabeth; Barlow d. 1664
Catherine; Sempill d. bef. 1685	Charles; 2nd Baronet d. bef. 1689	Penelope; Haward d. c. 1690
Francis; 3rd Baronet d. 1714

Legend

XXX	Subject of the article	XXX	Baronets; Hamilton

== Ulster Plantation ==
On 23 June 1610 Francis's grandfather Alexander was granted the great (2000 acres) proportion of Clonyn, also known as Tagleagh, in the Tullaghchinko (also called Tollochonee) precinct, County Cavan. This plantation precinct corresponds to the modern barony of Tullyhunco. He never came to see this proportion and his son Claud, Francis's father, took over its possession.

== Baronet ==
On 29 September 1628 Hamilton was created a Baronet in the Baronetage of Nova Scotia.

== First marriage and children ==
About 1630 Sir Francis, as he was now, married Laetitia Coote, daughter of Sir Charles Coote, 1st Baronet and his wife Dorothea Cuffe.

Francis and Laetitia had at least one child:

1. Sir Charles Hamilton, 2nd Baronet, of Castle Hamilton

== Manor ==
In 1631 the three estates Clonkine, Carrotubber, and Clonyn, were consolidated in a manor that was originally called Castle Killagh, but was later known as Castle Hamilton. The mentioned estates correspond to the modern townlands Clonkeen, Corratober, and Clooneen, which all are in the barony of Tullyhunco of County Cavan. Castle Hamilton stands east of the village of Killeshandra.

== Parliament 1640–1649 ==
He was a member of the Irish Parliaments of 1640–1649 (Note: Also called the "Parliament 1639–1648" as its start date and end date are both affected by the shift in the start of the year from 25 March to 1 January in the calendar reform of 1750. The opening date, the 16 March 1640, was still in 1639 according to the Old Style (O.S.) calendar, in force in Great Britain and Ireland at the time. Similarly, the end date, 30 January 1649 (the execution of Charles I), was still in 1648 according to O.S.) In the Irish general election of 1640 he was returned for one of the two seats of Jamestown Borough in County Leitrim.

== Second marriage ==
He married Elizabeth Barlow after 1658 as her third husband. She was a daughter of Randolph Barlow, Archbishop of Tuam. She had married first William Hay, who had died in 1635 and then Sir Francis Willoughby, who had died in 1658.

== Parliament 1661–1666 ==
He was a member of the Irish Parliaments of 1661–1666. In the Irish general election of 1661 he was returned for one of the two seats of County Cavan.

== Death and succession ==
Hamilton died in 1673 and was succeeded by his eldest son Charles as 2nd Baronet.

Timeline
As his birth date is uncertain, so are all his ages.
Age	Date	Event
0	1606	Born
11–12	1618	Father died.
18–19	1625, 27 Mar	Accession of King Charles I, succeeding King James I
21–22	1628, 29 Sep	Created Baronet Hamilton of Killock
23–24	1630, about	Married Laetitia Coote
33–34	1640, 27 Feb	Returned for Jamestown Borough
51–52	1658, after	Married Elizabeth Barlow
54–55	1661, 12 April	Returned for County Cavan
66–67	1673	Died

== Notes and references ==
=== Sources ===
- Brewer, John Sherren; Bullen, William, eds. (1873). Calendar of the Carew Manuscripts Preserved in the Archiepiscopal Library at Lambeth. London: Longman & Co. OCLC 1181395955. – 1603 to 1624
- Burke, Bernard (1866). A Genealogical History of the Dormant, Abeyant, Forfeited and Extinct Peerages of the British Empire (New ed.). London: Harrison. OCLC 11501348.
- Cokayne, George Edward (1902). Complete Baronetage, 1611 to 1800. Vol. II (1st ed.). Exeter: William Pollard & Co. OCLC 866278985. – 1625 to 1649
- Fryde, Edmund Boleslaw; Greenway, D. E.; Porter, S.; Roy, I., eds. (1986). Handbook of British Chronology. Royal Historical Society Guides and Handbooks, No. 2 (3rd ed.). London: Offices of the Royal Historical Society. ISBN 0-86193-106-8. – (for timeline)
- Gerard, John (1913). "Chronology, General". In Herbermann, Charles George (ed.). Catholic Encyclopedia. Vol. III. New York: The Encyclopedia Press. pp. 738–742. OCLC 1157968788.
- House of Commons (1878). Return. Members of Parliament – Part II. Parliaments of Great Britain, 1705–1796. Parliaments of the United Kingdom, 1801–1874. Parliaments and Conventions of the Estates of Scotland, 1357–1707. Parliaments of Ireland, 1599–1800. London: His/Her Majesty's Stationery Office. OCLC 13112546.
- McGrath, Brid (1997). "Francis Hamilton (1606-1673), Jamestown". A Biographical Dictionary of the Membership of the Irish House of Commons 1640 to 1641 (Ph.D.). Vol. 1. Dublin: Trinity College. pp. 173–175. hdl:2262/77206. – Parliaments & Biographies (PDF downloaded from given URL)

Parliament of Ireland
Preceded by Charles Coote junior Sir William Anderson	Member of Parliament for Jamestown Borough; 1640–1649; With: Sir John Giffard	Succeeded by Sir Robert Meredith; Sir William Dixon
Preceded by Philip McHugh O'Rely; Robert Baylye	Member of Parliament for County Cavan; 1661–1666; With: Thomas Coote	Succeeded by Francis Hamilton; Robert Saunderson
Baronetage of Nova Scotia
New creation	Baronet (of Killock); 1628 – 1673	Succeeded by Charles Hamilton
