= Cavan (disambiguation) =

Cavan may refer to:

== Places ==
- County Cavan, a county in Ireland
- Cavan, County Cavan's county town
  - Cavan Institute, a college
- Cavan, a townland of County Down, Northern Ireland
- Cavan, a townland of County Antrim, Northern Ireland
- Cavan, a townland of County Armagh, Northern Ireland
- Cavan, Killyman, a townland in County Tyrone, Northern Ireland
- Cavan, Côtes-d'Armor, France
- Cavan Monaghan, Ontario, Canada
- Cavan, South Australia, Australia
- Cavan, New South Wales, Australia

== Political constituencies ==
- Cavan Borough (Parliament of Ireland constituency) (1611–1800)
- County Cavan (Parliament of Ireland constituency) (1611–1800)
- County Cavan (UK Parliament constituency) (1801–1885)
- East Cavan (1885–1922)
- West Cavan (1885–1922)
- Cavan (Dáil constituency) (1921–1977)
- Cavan–Monaghan (from 1977)

== People ==
- Cavan (name), including a list of people with the given name and surname
- Earl of Cavan, a title in the Peerage of Ireland

== Other uses ==
- Cavan (unit), a Filipino unit of mass and volume
- Cavan (horse) (foaled 1955), an Irish thoroughbred racehorse

== See also ==
- Kevan, a given name and surname
