= Hugh Reily =

Hugh Reily, also known as Hugh Reilly or Hugh O'Reilly (c.1630 – 1695) was M.P. for Cavan Borough in the Patriot Parliament of 1689 and a famous political author. His Irish name was Aodh O'Raghallaigh and his ancestors were the Lords of East Breifne and Chiefs of the O'Reilly clan. Reilly was a close relative of John O'Reilly of Caulfield, Laragh Parish, County Cavan who was an ancestor of John Charles McQuaid, Archbishop of Dublin.

Hugh Reilly was born in County Cavan, Ireland about 1630 and studied at the Irish Bar where he qualified as a barrister about 1650. Hugh Reilly was legal advisor to Saint Oliver Plunkett, Archbishop of Armagh during his trial in 1681, after Plunkett's previous advisor Sir Nicholas Plunkett died. Plunkett said about Reilly "he took many risks for me".

On 22 May 1686 Reilly was appointed Master in Chancery. He lived in the parish of Laragh and in 1689 was elected from there, along with Philip Og O'Reilly, as an M.P. to represent the Borough of Cavan in the Dublin Patriot Parliament of King James II. In the 1689 Irish Jacobite Government he was appointed as Clerk of the Privy Council (Hugh Riley) on 5 March 1689.

After the defeat of King James II by King William III, Reilly fled to France with the king. In 1690 James II appointed him Lord Chancellor of Ireland at St. Germains, but it was a titular title only as James then had no power to so appoint. Hugh Reilly was attainted in 1691 by King William III and his land in County Cavan was confiscated. In 1695 he published Ireland's Case briefly stated; a second edition, appeared in 1720. It gives an account of the conduct and misfortunes of the Roman Catholics in Ireland from the reign of Elizabeth to that of James II, and complains of the neglect they suffered under Charles II. The statements throughout are general, and few dates or particular facts are given. The last speech of Oliver Plunkett is added. It is said that James II, offended by the tone of Reilly's book, dismissed him from his service. Harris in his edition of Ware's Works, (Ware, Sir James, Works: Walter Harris. Dublin 1764, vol. 2, p. 259), states- "King James was so offended at Reilly's free treatment of him, that he took away his small salary, and turned him out of his titular office of Lord Chancellor of Ireland; the loss of which lay so heavy upon his spirits that he died soon after, about the year 1694. It is said King James restored him to his pension a short time before his death and I have been assured that he shewed his book to King James before he put it under the press, who had the perusal of it for three weeks, and upon returning it, told the author there was too much truth in it; but did not forbid him to make it public—yet, when it appeared abroad, he treated him as before related." He is believed to have died in 1695.

The Impartial History of Ireland (London, 1754) is a reprint of Reilly's Ireland's Case, and it was again issued under the same title at Dublin in 1787, and as the Genuine History of Ireland at Dublin in 1799 and in 1837. Burke's speech at the Bristol election of 1780 is printed with the edition of 1787, and a memoir of Daniel O'Connell with that of 1837. The form, paper, and type of the book show that it was bought by the populace in Ireland; its popularity was due to no special merit, but to the fact that it was long almost the only printed argument in favour of Irish Roman Catholics.
