= Hamilton baronets of Donalong and Nenagh (1660) =

Baronetcy in Ireland

The Hamilton baronetcy, of Donalong in County Tyrone and of Nenagh in County Tipperary, was created in the Baronetage of Ireland in about 1660 for the Hon. George Hamilton. (Note: The baronetcy is in the Baronetage of Ireland according to Cokayne, Millar in the DNB and Burke, Peerage, 31st edition (1869); but in the Baronetage of Scotland according to Burke, 99th edition.) He was the fourth son of James Hamilton, 1st Earl of Abercorn (see the Duke of Abercorn), and the younger brother of the 1st Baronet of West Port. His grandson, the second Baronet, succeeded as 6th Earl of Abercorn in 1701.

== Hamilton baronets, of Donalong and Nenagh (1660) ==
- Sir George Hamilton, 1st Baronet (c. 1607 – 1679)
- Sir James Hamilton, 2nd Baronet (c. 1661 – 1734) who succeeded as the 6th Earl of Abercorn in 1701. From there on the title became one of a number of subsidiary titles of the earls and later marquesses and dukes of Abercorn. See Duke of Abercorn for further history of this extant title.
