= Hamilton baronets of Rosehall (1703) =

The Hamilton baronetcy, of Rosehall in the County of Lanark, was created in the Baronetage of Nova Scotia on 10 April 1703 for Archibald Hamilton, a merchant of Edinburgh. He was a descendant of Walter Hamilton, brother of Sir James Hamilton, father of James Hamilton, 1st Lord Hamilton, ancestor of the Dukes of Hamilton and Dukes of Abercorn. He bought the Haggs estate in 1691, from Sir Alexander Hamilton, 1st Baronet

He was succeeded by his third son James, who sat as Member of Parliament for Lanarkshire, and died childless. He was succeeded by his younger brother, 3rd Baronet. On his death in 1755 the baronetcy became dormant.

== Hamilton baronets, of Rosehall (1703) ==
- Sir Archibald Hamilton, 1st Baronet (died 1709)
- Sir James Hamilton, 2nd Baronet (1682–1750)
- Sir Hugh Hamilton, 3rd Baronet (died 1755)

== Extended family ==
The 1st Baronet's brother Sir Robert Hamilton was a Lord of Session under the judicial title of Lord Presmennan. He was the father of John Hamilton, 2nd Lord Belhaven and Stenton.
