= Diocese of Wichita =

Diocese of the Catholic Church

Coordinates: 37°41′32″N 97°20′14″W

Diocese of Wichita Dioecesis Wichitensis
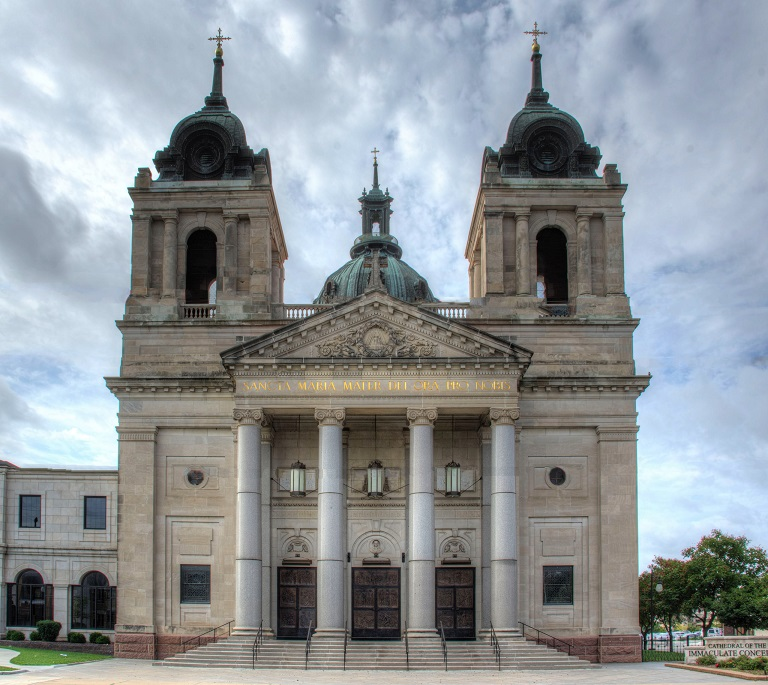
- Cathedral of the Immaculate Conception

- Coat of arms

Location
- Country: United States
- Territory: 25 counties in southeast Kansas
- Ecclesiastical province: Kansas City in Kansas

Statistics
- Area: 20,021 sq mi (51,850 km^{2})
- Population: Total; Catholics: (as of 2010); 979,000; 120,527 (12.8%)
- Parishes: 90

Information
- Denomination: Catholic
- Sui iuris church: Latin Church
- Rite: Roman Rite
- Established: August 2, 1887 (139 years ago)
- Cathedral: Cathedral of the Immaculate Conception
- Patron saint: Immaculate Conception

Current leadership
- Pope: Leo XIV
- Bishop: Carl A. Kemme
- Metropolitan Archbishop: William Shawn McKnight

Map
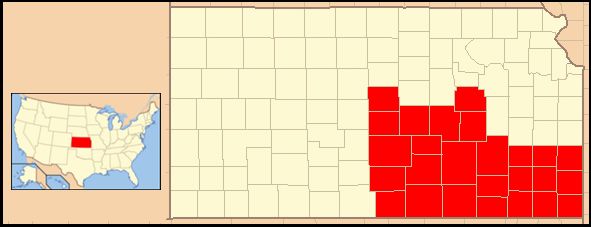

Website
- catholicdioceseofwichita.org

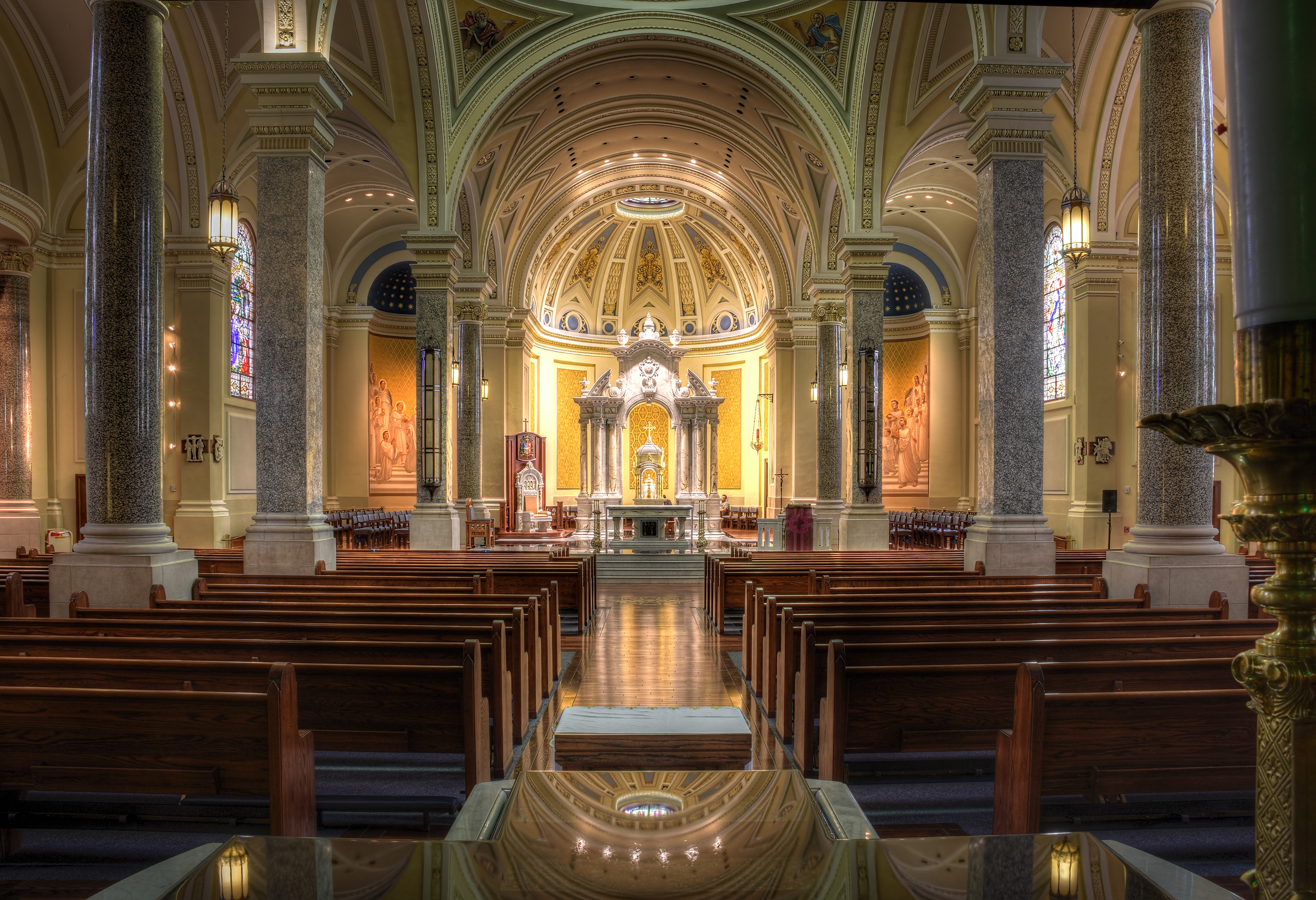
Cathedral of the Immaculate Conception, Wichita, Kansas (2016)

The Diocese of Wichita (Latin: Dioecesis Wichitensis) is a diocese of the Catholic Church in Kansas in the United States. It is a suffragan diocese in the ecclesiastical province of the metropolitan Archdiocese of Kansas City in Kansas.

== Territory ==
The Diocese of Wichita covers the following Kansas counties: Allen, Bourbon, Butler, Chase, Chautauqua, Cherokee, Cowley, Crawford, Elk, Greenwood, Harper, Harvey, Kingman, Labette, Marion, McPherson, Montgomery, Morris, Neosho, Reno, Rice, Sedgwick, Sumner, Wilson, and Woodson counties in south central and southeast Kansas.

== History ==
=== 1540 to 1850 ===
The earliest Catholic presence in present-day Kansas was during the 1540s, when Juan de Padilla, a Spanish missionary priest, accompanied the explorer Francisco Vázquez de Coronado on his expedition through the region.

During the 18th century, Kansas was under the jurisdictions of Spain and France. The few Catholics in the area were governed by the Diocese of Louisiana and the Two Floridas, based in New Orleans. With the Louisiana Purchase of 1803, France ceded control of Kansas and other territories to the United States.

The Vatican in 1826 erected the Diocese of St. Louis, which included Kansas and the vast Missouri Territory. During the early 1800s, Catholic missionaries started building chapels for their Native American converts. In 1847, Jesuit priests established the St. Mary's Mission in St. Marys in eastern Kansas, along the Oregon Trail, to evangelize the Potawatomi people.

=== 1850 to 1870 ===
Pope Pius IX in 1850 erected the Vicariate Apostolic of Indian Territory East of the Rocky Mountains. This huge jurisdiction covered the Catholics in the present-day states of Kansas, Nebraska, North and South Dakota, Colorado, Wyoming, and Montana. The pope named John Miège from St. Louis as the vicar apostolic.

Miège arrived in 1851 at an Potawatomi encampment on the Kansas River. At that time, his vicariate contained five churches, eight priests, and 5,000 Catholics. He then moved to the Jesuit mission at St. Marys. Miège conducted extensive pastoral visitations throughout the vicariate, visiting Native American villages, forts, trading posts, and towns. He celebrated mass at these stops on the rear end of his wagon.

In 1855, Miège moved his episcopal see in Leavenworth in eastern Kansas in order to better minister to the growing number of Catholic European settlers there. By this time, the vicariate had a Catholic population of 5,000, with 3,000 Native American converts. It was served by eight priests in 11 missions and 18 stations.

In 1857, the Vatican suppressed the Vicariate of the Indian Territory, creating instead the Vicariate of Kansas, including all of Kansas. Miège was named vicar of the new vicariate. Miège erected an episcopal residence in Leavenworth in 1863.

=== 1870 to 1900 ===
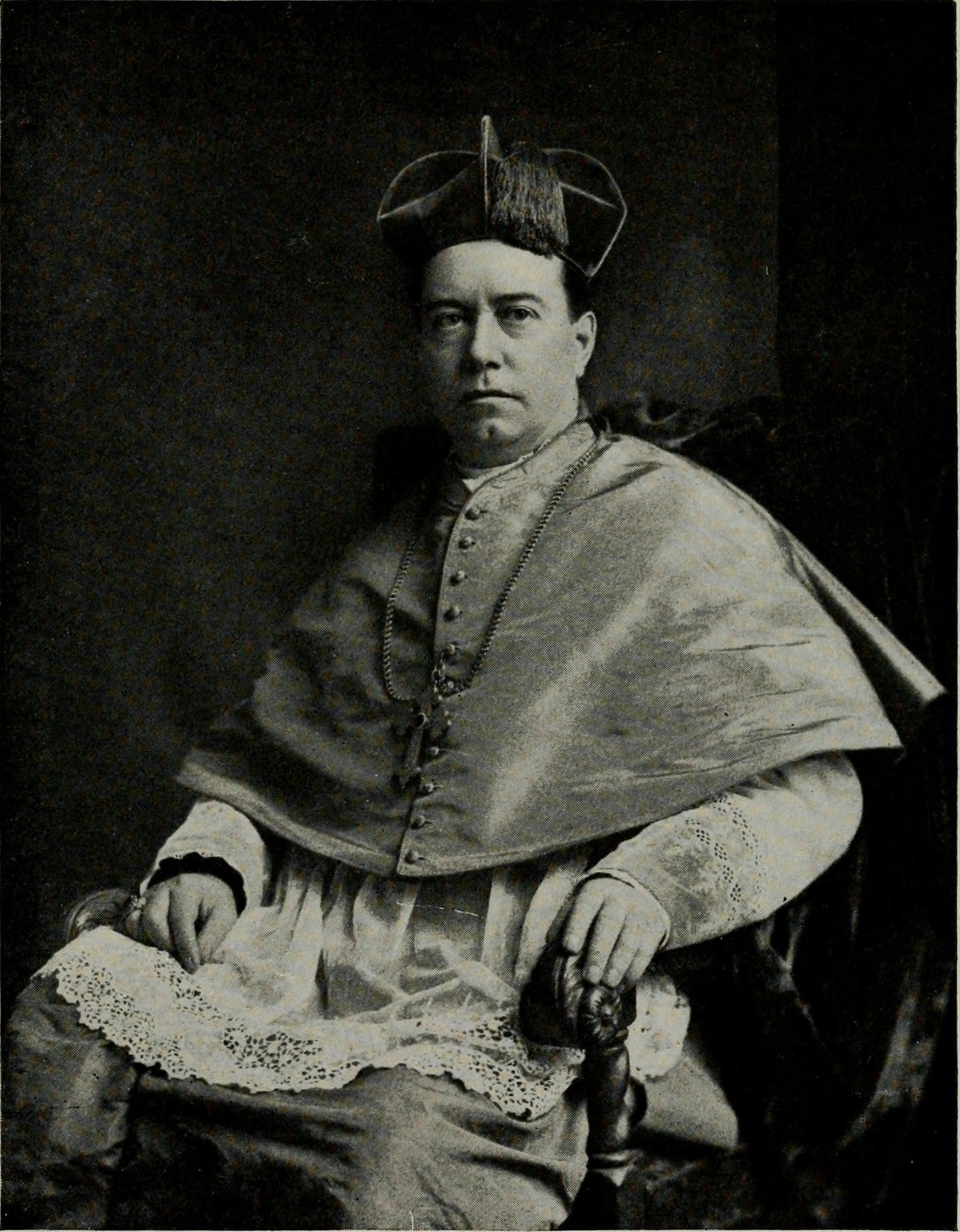
Bishop Hennessy (1921)

The first Catholic church in Wichita, St. Mary's, was dedicated in 1872. That same year, the first Catholic parish was organized in Hutchinson, holding its services in a granary. The first resident pastor within the Wichita area was appointed in 1873.Miège resigned as vicar in 1874.

The Diocese of Leavenworth, covering all of Kansas, was erected in 1877 by Pius IX. He named Louis Fink as its first bishop. Kansas grew so rapidly over the next ten years that Fink petitioned the Vatican to establish two new dioceses in the western part of the state.

In 1887, Pope Leo XIII erected the Diocese of Wichita, taking southwestern Kansas from the Diocese of Leavenworth. The pope named James O'Reilly as the first bishop of Wichita, but he died before his consecration.

In 1888, Leo XIII appointed John J. Hennessy of St. Louis to replace O'Reilly. Hennessy found a struggling new diocese, missionary in nature. The first census in 1889 showed a Catholic population of 8,000 with 16 priests. In 1890, Hennessy persuaded the Sisters of the Sorrowful Mother to take over management of St. Francis Hospital in Wichita. Today it is Ascension Via Christi St. Francis Hospital, In 1898, Hennessy convened the first diocesan synod.

=== 1900 to 1950 ===
Hennessy broke ground for the Cathedral of the Immaculate Conception in Wichita in 1906 and laid the cornerstone the following October; it was dedicated by Cardinal James Gibbons in 1912. By the early 1900s, the Catholic population had reached 32,000 in 97 parishes, most with schools. Bishop of Wichita for 32 years, Hennessy died in 1920.

In 1921, Augustus Schwertner of the Diocese of Cleveland was appointed bishop of the Diocese of Wichita by Pope Benedict XV. When he arrived in Wichita, the diocese had 110 priests, 81 parishes, 49 parochial schools, and eight hospitals to serve a Catholic population of 36,905. By his final year as bishop in 1939, the diocese had 56,248 Catholics, 155 priests, 97 parishes, 65 parochial schools, and 13 hospitals. Sacred Heart Junior College in Wichita was established in 1933 by the Sisters Adorers of the Blood of Christ. It is now Newman University.

After Schwertner died in 1939, Pope Pius XII named Auxiliary Bishop Christian Winkelmann of St. Louis as the next bishop of Wichita. He died in 1946. Pius XII then appointed Mark Carroll from St. Louis as Winkelmann's successor. In 1948, Carroll called for the repeal of the state prohibition law against alcohol sales, calling it "an unwarrantable infringement" on "reasonable liberty." He was an outspoken proponent of ecumenism and of the use of vernacular in the Mass. Winkelmann also supported the American Civil Rights Movement, and stated that his self-confessed mission was "to preach equality of man and dignity and worth."

=== 1950 to present ===
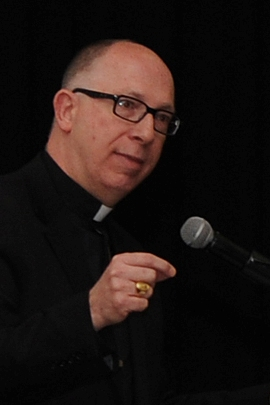
Bishop Jackels (2009)

In 1951, Pope Pius XII erected the new Diocese of Dodge City from the western counties of the Diocese of Wichita. After Carroll retired as bishop of Wichita in 1967, Pope Paul VI appointed Auxiliary Bishop David Maloney of the Archdiocese of Denver as the new bishop of Wichita. In 1977, Maloney publicly declared that he would defy a city ordinance that prohibited discrimination in employment, housing and public accommodations based on sexual orientation. Maloney retired as bishop of Wichita in 1982.

Maloney was succeeded by Bishop Eugene Gerber from the Diocese of Dodge City, named by Pope John Paul II in 1982. In 1999, Thomas Olmsted of the Diocese of Lincoln was appointed coadjutor bishop of Wichita by Pope John Paul II to assist Gerber. When Gerber retired in 2001, Olmsted succeeded him. In 2003, after only two years in Wichita, John Paul II transferred Olmsted to the Diocese of Phoenix.

John Paul II appointed Michael Jackels of the Diocese of Lincoln as bishop of Wichita in 2005. In 2013, Pope Francis named Jackels as archbishop of the Archdiocese of Dubuque.

Francis appointed Carl A. Kemme from the Diocese of Springfield in Illinois as bishop of Wichita in 2014. In 2018, the diocese announced that it had ordained ten seminarians as priests for the second year in a row.Ascension Via Christi St. Francis hospital in Wichita was sued in July 2023 by three female patients who had been raped by an intruder, accusing the Catholic hospital of lax security. The alleged rapist, Miguel Rodela, was captured immediately after the third attack.

=== Sex Abuse ===
In a 1994 meeting with Bishop Arthur Tafoya of the Diocese of Pueblo regarding sexual abuse allegations in Colorado, the priest Robert D. Blanpied admitted to abusing two boys when he previously served in Wichita. Tafoya permanently removed him from ministry that year.

In November 2000, Robert Larson, the former head of Catholic Charities for the diocese, was charged with sexually abusing four altar boys at St. Mary's Catholic Church in Newton in the 1980s. He pleaded guilty in February 2001 to one count of indecent liberties with a child and three counts of sexual battery and was sentenced to three to ten years in prison. Diocesan records would later show as many as fifteen accusations of sexual abuse against Larson going back to 1981. In June 2001, the diocese reached a financial settlement with several of Larson's victims.

In February 2019, the Kansas Bureau of Investigation (KBI) announced that it had been investigating sex abuse allegations against all the Catholic dioceses in Kansas since November 2018. In September, 2019, Bishop Kemme published a list of 15 diocesan priests that faced credible accusations of sexual abuse of minors. Eleven of the priests were deceased and the others were no longer in ministry. In August 2020, Melissa Underwood, KBI spokeswoman, referring to the entire State of Kansas, stated, "As of Aug. 7, we have had 205 reports of abuse and have opened 120 cases."

== Bishops ==
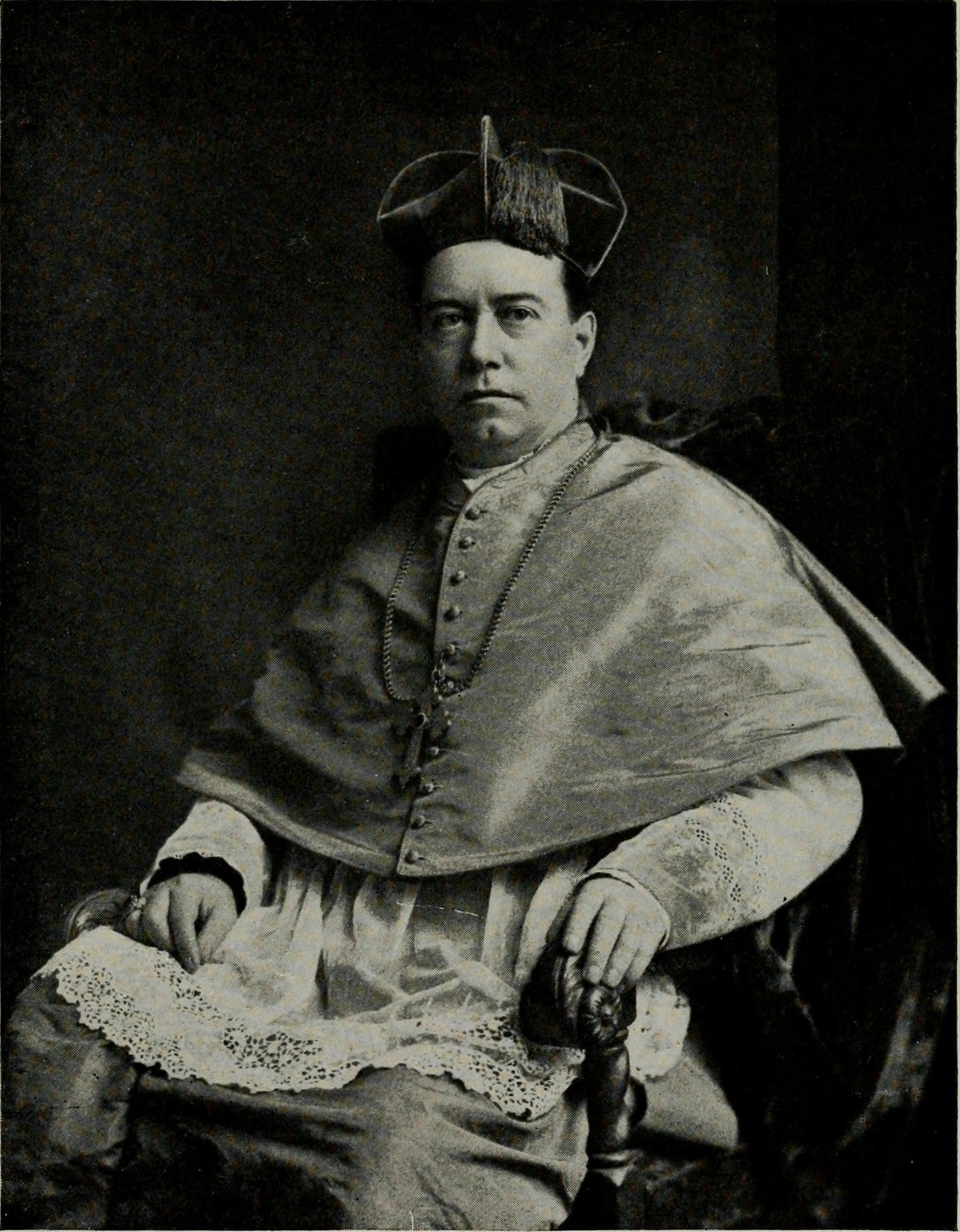
Bishop Hennessy (1921)

=== Bishops of Wichita ===
1. James O'Reilly (1887); died before being consecrated bishop
2. John Joseph Hennessy (1888–1920)
3. Augustus John Schwertner (1921–1939)
4. Christian Herman Winkelmann (1939–1946)
5. Mark Kenny Carroll (1947–1967)
  - Leo Christopher Byrne (coadjutor bishop 1961–1967), appointed Coadjutor Archbishop of Saint Paul and Minneapolis before succession
6. David Monas Maloney (1967–1982)
7. Eugene John Gerber (1982–2001)
8. Thomas J. Olmsted (2001–2003), appointed Bishop of Phoenix
9. Michael Owen Jackels (2005–2013), appointed Archbishop of Dubuque
10. Carl A. Kemme (2014–present)

=== Other diocesan priests who became bishops ===
- John Henry Tihen, appointed Bishop of Lincoln in 1911 and Bishop of Denver in 1917
- Ignatius Jerome Strecker, appointed Bishop of Springfield-Cape Girardeau in 1962 and Archbishop of Kansas City in Kansas in 1969
- Eugene John Gerber, appointed Bishop of Dodge City in 1976. He returned as Bishop of Wichita in 1982
- Ronald Michael Gilmore, appointed Bishop of Dodge City in 1998
- Paul Stagg Coakley, appointed Bishop of Salina in 2004 and Archbishop of Oklahoma City in 2010
- James Douglas Conley, appointed Auxiliary Bishop of Denver in 2008 and Bishop of Lincoln in 2012
- John Balthasar Brungardt, appointed Bishop of Dodge City in 2010
- Shawn McKnight, appointed Bishop of Jefferson City in 2017 and Archbishop of Kansas City in Kansas in 2025.

== Emil Kapaun ==
Emil Joseph Kapaun was a priest of the Diocese of Wichita who was declared venerable by Pope Frances in 2025. Kapaun was born on April 20, 1916, and grew up on a farm near Pilsen, Kansas. He was ordained a priest in 1940. He was serving as a military chaplain in the US Army during the Korean War when his unit retreated in the face of an enemy advance. Kapaun refused to evacuate, staying to tend the wounded. Captured by the Peoples Liberation Army of China, Kapaun died in captivity in 1951. He was honored with the Congressional Medal of Honor,

In March 2021, Kapaun's remains were identified by the Army from a group of unknown remains at the National Memorial Cemetery of the Pacific in Honolulu, Hawaii. His remains were repatriated to Wichita in September 2021 for reburial.

== Education ==
The Thomas B. Fordham Institute in 2008 published a study on urban catholic schools in the United States. It cited the Wichita Catholic Schools as one of six best examples of urban catholic schools. As of 2023, the diocese had 34 primary schools and one pre-school.

=== High schools ===
- Bishop Carroll Catholic High School – Wichita
- Kapaun Mt. Carmel High School – Wichita
- St. Mary's-Colgan Jr/Sr High School – Pittsburg
- Trinity Catholic Jr/Sr High School – Hutchinson

== See also ==
- Catholic Church by country
- Catholic Church hierarchy
- List of the Catholic dioceses of the United States
