= Cavan (name) =

Cavan is a name used as a given name or surname. It is an anglicized version of Caoimhín and variant of Kevan. Notable people with the name include:

== Given name ==
- Caomhán of Inisheer (may have died in 865), anglicised as Cavan, an Irish saint
- Cavan Biggio (born 1995), American baseball player
- Cavan Clerkin (born 1972), British actor and filmmaker
- Cavan Scott (born 1973), English comic writer and author
- Cavan Sullivan (born 2009), American soccer player

== Surname ==
- Gilbert Cavan (died 1420), Irish cleric
- Harry Cavan (1916–2000), Irish football executive
- Mike Cavan (born 1948), American football player and coach
- Ruth Shonle Cavan (1896–1993), American sociologist

== See also ==
- Earl of Cavan, a title in the Peerage of Ireland
- Cavan (disambiguation)
