= Hamilton baronets of London (1642) =

Escutcheon of the Hamilton baronets of London

The Hamilton baronetcy, of London, was created in the Baronetage of England on 11 May 1642 for John Hamilton. The title became extinct on his death circa 1670.

== Hamilton baronets, of London (1642) ==
- Sir John Hamilton, 1st Baronet (died c. 1670)
