= Hamilton baronets of Dunamana (1781) =

The Hamilton baronetcy, of Dunamana in the County of Tyrone, was created in the Baronetage of Ireland on 1 February 1781 for John Stuart Hamilton. The title became extinct on the death of the 2nd Baronet.

== Hamilton baronets, of Dunamana (1781) ==
- Sir John Stuart Hamilton, 1st Baronet (c. 1740 – 1802). He represented Strabane in the Parliament of Ireland three times.
- Sir John Charles Hamilton, 2nd Baronet (died 1818)
