= David O'Reilly =

David O'Reilly may refer to:

- David OReilly (artist) (born 1985), Irish filmmaker and artist
- David O'Reilly, BBC Northern Ireland presenter more commonly known as Rigsy
- Dave O'Reilly (born 1947), chairman of Chevron Corporation
