= Hamilton baronets of Mount Hamilton (1683) =

Extinct Irish title of nobility

Escutcheon of the Hamilton baronets of Mount Hamilton

The Hamilton baronetcy, of Mount Hamilton in the County of Armagh, was created in the Baronetage of Ireland on 19 February 1683 for Robert Hamilton, a Commissioner of the Irish Revenue. The title became extinct on the death of the 2nd Baronet in 1731.

== Hamilton baronets, of Mount Hamilton (1683) ==
- Sir Robert Hamilton, 1st Baronet (died 1703)
- Sir Hans Hamilton, 2nd Baronet (1673–1731)
