= Carl A. Kemme =

American Catholic prelate (born 1960)

His Excellency, The Most Reverend Carl Alan Kemme
- Bishop of Wichita
- Church: Catholic Church
- Province: Kansas City in Kansas
- See: Wichita
- Appointed: February 20, 2014
- Installed: May 1, 2014
- Predecessor: Michael Owen Jackels

Orders
- Ordination: May 10, 1986 by Daniel L. Ryan
- Consecration: May 1, 2014 by Joseph Fred Naumann, George Joseph Lucas, and Thomas Paprocki

Personal details
- Born: August 14, 1960 (age 66) Effingham, Illinois
- Education: Immaculate Conception Seminary; Cardinal Glennon College Seminary; Kenrick Seminary
- Motto: Humilitas (Latin for 'Humility')
- Styles
- Reference style: His Excellency; The Most Reverend
- Spoken style: Your Excellency
- Religious style: Bishop

Carl Alan Kemme (born August 14, 1960) is an American Catholic prelate who serves as bishop of Wichita in Kansas.

== Biography ==
=== Early life ===
Carl Kemme was born on August 14, 1960, in Effingham, Illinois to Donald and Marita (Kortte) Kemme, who ran a farm near Shumway, Illinois. Carl Kemme has four brothers and one sister. Kemme attended Shumway Elementary School and then Beecher City High School. After deciding to study for the priesthood, Kemme transferred to St. Henry's Preparatory Seminary in Belleville, Illinois, where he finished high school.

After high school, Kemme enrolled at Immaculate Conception Seminary in Springfield, Illinois. He later graduated from Cardinal Glennon College in St. Louis and Kenrick Seminary in St. Louis with a Bachelor of Arts degree and a Master of Divinity degree.

=== Priesthood ===
Kemme was ordained a priest for the Diocese of Springfield in Illinois at the Cathedral of the Immaculate Conception by Bishop Daniel L. Ryan on May 10, 1986. After his ordination, Kemme served as parochial vicar in the following parishes in Illinois:

- St. Patrick in Decatur from 1986 to 1989
- Saints Peter and Paul in Collinsville from 1989 to 1990
- Blessed Sacrament in Springfield from 1990 to 1992

From 1992 to 1996, Kemme was named pastor of three parishes in Illinois:

- St. Mary's in Brussels
- St. Joseph in Meppen
- St. Barbara in Batchtown

Kemme served as the diocesan administrator of Our Lady of the Holy Spirit Parish in Mt. Zion, Illinois, from 1996 to 1997. He was then appointed pastor of Holy Family Parish in Decatur, serving there for the next six years. While still at Holy Family, Kemme was appointed priest moderator of St. James Parish in Decatur for two years. In 2002, he was named pastor of St. Peter Parish in Petersburg, Illinois, staying there from 2002 to 2005.

In 2002, Bishop George J. Lucas named Kemme as vicar general and moderator of the curia for the diocese; he would hold both positions until 2009. On August 23, 2002, Pope John Paul II named him a Prelate of Honor with the title Monsignor. He was assigned as pastor of St. John Vianney Parish in Sherman, Illinois.

In 2009, Kemme temporarily left his roles as vicar general and moderator to become diocesan administrator sede vacante after the departure of Bishop George Joseph Lucas. With the installation of a new bishop in Springfield, Kemme returned to being vicar general and moderator, remaining in both roles until 2014.

=== Bishop of Wichita ===
On February 20, 2014, Pope Francis appointed Kemme as the eleventh bishop of Wichita. He was consecrated by Archbishop Joseph Naumann on May 1, 2014, in the Cathedral of the Immaculate Conception in Wichita. Lucas and Bishop Thomas Paprocki were the principal co-consecrators.

On September 20, 2019, Kemme published a list of 15 priests who faced credible accusations of sexual abuse of minors. Eleven of the priests were deceased, and the others were no longer in ministry. Kemme added this statement:

Owning our past is the first step in building a new future, one in which we will continue to diligently work hard as we have been for many years now, so that these violations to human dignity will never happen again. Many of the faithful will no doubt experience great anger in receiving this information. I share that anger.

On November 1, 2021, Kemme placed Michael Schemm from Resurrection Parish in Bel Aire, on suspension pending investigation. The diocese had received sexual abuse allegations against Schemm dating back to the 1990s. The diocese also forwarded the allegations to local police. Due to insufficient evidence of any crime, Schemm was not indicted and returned to ministry in March 2022.

== See also ==
- Catholic Church hierarchy
- Catholic Church in the United States
- Historical list of the Catholic bishops of the United States
- List of Catholic bishops of the United States
- Lists of patriarchs, archbishops, and bishops

== Episcopal succession ==
Catholic Church titles
Preceded by Michael Owen Jackels	Bishop of Wichita; 2014–Present	Incumbent
