= Hamilton baronets of Barnton (1692) =

Escutcheon of the Hamilton baronets of Barnton

The Hamilton baronetcy, of Barnton, was created in the Baronetage of Nova Scotia on 1 March 1692 for George Hamilton, with background the Hamiltons of Binning. The title became extinct on his death in 1726.

== Hamilton baronets, of Barnton (1692) ==
- Sir George Hamilton, 1st Baronet (died 1726). He married Helen Balfour, given a probable identification by Cokayne as a daughter of Sir Andrew Balfour MD. He was said to have died in poverty, on the streets of Edinburgh.
