= Hamilton baronets of Ilford (1937) =

Escutcheon of the Hamilton baronets of Ilford

The Hamilton baronetcy, of Ilford in the County of Essex, was created in the Baronetage of the United Kingdom on 10 June 1937 for the electrical engineer and Conservative politician Sir George Hamilton. He was the son of the Venerable George Hans Hamilton, Archdeacon of Northumberland and Canon of Durham. He was succeeded by his son Patrick, the 2nd Baronet; he was childless and the title became extinct on his death in 1992.

== Hamilton baronets, of Ilford (1937) ==
- Sir (Collingwood) George Clements Hamilton, 1st Baronet (1877–1947)
- Sir Patrick George Hamilton, 2nd Baronet (1908–1992)
