= Christian Herman Winkelmann =

American prelate

His Excellency, The Most Reverend Christian Herman Winkelmann
- Bishop of Wichita; Titular Bishop of Sita
- See: Diocese of Wichita
- Appointed: September 13, 1933
- Installed: March 5, 1940
- Term ended: November 19, 1946
- Predecessor: Augustus John Schwertner
- Successor: Mark Kenny Carroll
- Previous posts: Auxiliary Bishop of St. Louis; 1933 to 1940

Orders
- Ordination: June 11, 1907 by John Joseph Glennon
- Consecration: November 30, 1934 by John J. Glennon

Personal details
- Born: September 12, 1883 St. Louis, Missouri, US
- Died: November 19, 1946 (aged 63) Wichita, Kansas, US
- Denomination: Roman Catholic
- Parents: John and Anna (née Becker) Winkelmann
- Education: St. Francis Solanus College; Kenrick Seminary
- Motto: In omnibus caritas (In all things, love)

Christian Herman Winkelmann (September 12, 1883 – November 19, 1946) was an American prelate of the Roman Catholic Church. He served as bishop of Wichita in Kansas from 1940 to 1946. He previously served as an auxiliary bishop of the Archdiocese of St. Louis in Missouri from 1933 to 1940.

== Biography ==
=== Early life ===
Christian Winkelmann was born on September 12, 1883, in St. Louis, Missouri, to John and Anna (née Becker) Winkelmann. He attended St. Francis Solanus College in Quincy, Illinois, then returned to Missouri to enter Kenrick Seminary in St. Louis.

=== Priesthood ===
Winkelmann was ordained to the priesthood in St. Louis by Archbishop John Joseph Glennon for the Archdiocese of St. Louis on June 11, 1907. After his ordination, the archdiocese assigned Winkelmann as curate at St. Peter's Parish in St. Charles, Missouri. In 1922, he was named pastor of Sacred Heart Parish in Rich Fountain, Missouri. Winkelmann served as pastor of St. Francis de Sales Parish in St. Louis from 1929 to 1939.

=== Auxiliary Bishop of St. Louis ===
On September 13, 1933, Winkelmann was appointed the first auxiliary bishop of St. Louis and titular bishop of Sita by Pope Pius XI. He received his episcopal consecration at Saint Louis Cathedral on November 30, 1933, from Glennon, with Bishops Thomas Lillis and Francis Johannes serving as co-consecrators.

=== Bishop of Wichita ===
Following the death of Bishop Augustus Schwertner, Winkelmann was named the third bishop of Wichita by Pope Pius XII on December 27, 1939. He was installed at Wichita on March 5, 1940.

Christian Winkelmann died in Wichita on November 19, 1946, at age 63.

Catholic Church titles
Preceded by Augustus John Schwertner	Bishop of Wichita; 1940–1946	Succeeded by Mark Kenny Carroll
Preceded by –	Auxiliary Bishop of St. Louis; 1933–1940	Succeeded by –
