= Hamilton baronets of West Port (1627) =

Escutcheon of the Hamilton baronets of West Port

The Hamilton baronetcy, of West Port, was created in the Baronetage of Nova Scotia in 1627 for the Hon. William Hamilton. He was the third son of James Hamilton, 1st Earl of Abercorn; after the death of Charles I of England, he represented Henrietta Maria at the papal curia, around 1660. The title became either extinct or dormant on Hamilton's death, thought be circa 1670.

== Hamilton baronets, of West Port (1627) ==
- Sir William Hamilton, 1st Baronet (c.1605 – c. 1680). He married Jean, widow of Sir Duncan Campbell, 2nd Baronet, killed in 1645. He died without issue.

== 1636 mission to Rome ==
Sir William Hamilton, a Catholic who spoke Italian, was chosen, on the death of Arthur Brett who had been intended for the mission by Sir Francis Windebank, for a diplomatic journey to the Vatican in mid-1636. With the favour of Queen Henrietta Maria, he gained the post, over a rival, William Habington. He travelled with the papal agent George Conn.

Hamilton was nominally representing the Queen, but two of the issues on which he had been briefed were the standing of the Oath of Allegiance of James I of England, and the possibility of a Catholic bishop for England. As well as religious and political matters, Charles I had given Hamilton some favours to ask of Pope Urban VIII, concerning the children of his sister Elizabeth Stuart, Queen of Bohemia. In a preliminary meeting with Cardinal Barberini, Hamilton brought up four points, including also the case of John Molle, tutor to William Cecil, 16th Baron Ros and Oliver St John in Florence in 1607, where he was detained by the Inquisition for speaking against the Catholic religion, and was still held. (Molle died in 1639.)

In 1638 Hamilton reported from Rome to Windebank the rumours that Godfrey Goodman, Bishop of Gloucester, had converted to Catholicism.
