= James O'Reilly (priest) =

James O'Reilly (1836 – July 26, 1887) was an American Roman Catholic priest.

From Topeka, Kansas, O'Reilly was appointed the first bishop of the Roman Catholic Diocese of Wichita, Kansas in 1887, but died on July 26, 1887, before his consecration.
