= Hamilton baronets of Haggs (1670) =

The Hamilton baronetcy, of Haggs in Scotland, was created in the Baronetage of Nova Scotia on 11 February 1670 for Alexander Hamilton, said by Cokayne to be of the Hamiltons of Orbistoun. The title became extinct on the death of the 2nd Baronet circa 1710.

== Hamilton baronets, of Haggs, Scotland (1670) ==
- Sir Alexander Hamilton, 1st Baronet (died before 1700)
- Sir Alexander Hamilton, 2nd Baronet (died c. 1710)
