= County Cavan (Parliament of Ireland constituency) =

Pre-1801 Irish constituency

- Former county constituency for the Irish House of Commons
- County: County Cavan

–1801
- Seats: 2
- Replaced by: County Cavan (UKHC)

County Cavan was a county constituency representing County Cavan in the Irish House of Commons, the lower house in the Parliament of Ireland of the Kingdom of Ireland. The parliamentary boroughs of Belturbet and Cavan were separately represented.

Under the Acts of Union 1800, the county was represented from 1 January 1801 by the Westminster constituency of County Cavan with two MPs in the United Kingdom House of Commons. The boroughs of Belturbet and Cavan lost their separate representation.

Between 1725 and 1793 Catholics and those married to Catholics could not vote.

== Members of Parliament ==
Election	First MP	Second MP	
1585	Philip Reilly	Edmund Reilly	
1613	Sir Oliver Lambart	Sir John Fishe	
1634	Sir Stephen Butler	Lucas Dillon	
1639	Colonel Philip O'Reilly (expelled 1642)	Robert Bailey	
1661	Sir Francis Hamilton, 3rd Baronet	Thomas Coote	
1689	Philip Reyley	John Reyly	
1692	Sir Francis Hamilton, 3rd Bt	Robert Saunderson (Note: Expelled in 1696.)	
1697	Sir Francis Hamilton, 3rd Bt	Francis White	
1703	Sir Francis Hamilton, 3rd Bt	Theophilus Butler	
1713	Sir Francis Hamilton, 3rd Bt	Robert Saunderson	
1715	Mervyn Pratt	Brockhill Newburgh	
1727	Charles Coote (I)	John Maxwell	
1751	Hon. Brinsley Butler (Note: Styled as Lord Newtown-Butler from 1756.)	John Maxwell	
1756	Hon. Brinsley Butler	Hon. Barry Maxwell	
1761	Hon. Brinsley Butler	Charles Coote (II)	
1766	Hon. Brinsley Butler	William Stewart	
1768	Hon. Barry Maxwell	George Montgomery	Patriot
1780	Hon. John James Maxwell	George Montgomery	Patriot
1783	Charles Stewart	George Montgomery	Patriot
1788	Charles Stewart	John Maxwell (Note: Declared not duly elected in 1788.)	
1788	Charles Stewart	Francis Saunderson	
1793	Viscount Maxwell	Francis Saunderson	
1800	Nathaniel Sneyd	Francis Saunderson	
1801	Succeeded by the Westminster constituency County Cavan		

=== Elections ===
General Election 1761: County Cavan 19 May
Party	Candidate	Votes	%	±%
	Hon. Brinsley Butler	506		
	Charles Coote (II)	466		
	George Montgomery	436		
	Hon. Barry Maxwell	467		

== Bibliography ==
- O'Hart, John (2007). The Irish and Anglo-Irish Landed Gentry: When Cromwell came to Ireland. Vol. II. Heritage Books. ISBN 0-7884-1927-7.
- Leigh Rayment's historical List of Members of the Irish House of Commons. Cites: Johnston-Liik, Edith Mary (2002). The History of the Irish Parliament 1692-1800 (6 volumes). Ulster Historical Foundation.
