= Cathedral of the Immaculate Conception (Wichita, Kansas) =

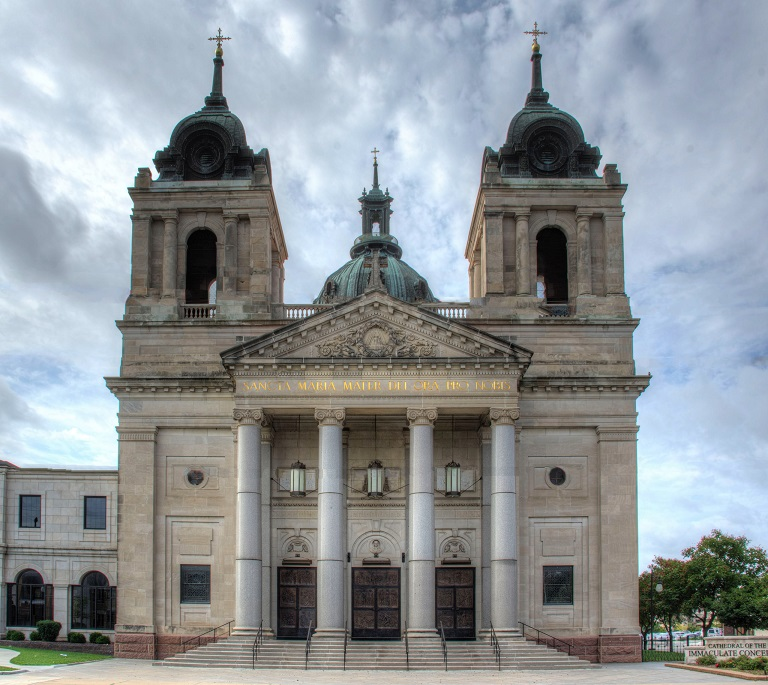

- Location in Kansas Cathedral of the Immaculate Conception (the United States)
- 37°41′35″N 97°20′07″W
- Location: 430 N. Broadway St. Wichita, Kansas
- Country: United States
- Denomination: Roman Catholic
- Website: wichitacathedral.com

History
- Status: Cathedral
- Founded: 1887
- Dedication: Immaculate Conception

Architecture
- Architect: Emmanuel Louis Masqueray
- Style: Renaissance Revival
- Groundbreaking: 1906
- Completed: 1912
- Construction cost: $500,000

Specifications
- Length: 169 feet (52 m)
- Width: 100 feet (30 m)
- Materials: Bedford stone

Administration
- Diocese: Wichita

Clergy
- Bishop: Most Rev. Carl A. Kemme
- Rector: Rev. Gabriel Greer

The Cathedral of the Immaculate Conception, also known as St. Mary's Cathedral, is a Catholic cathedral in Wichita, Kansas, United States. It is the seat of the Diocese of Wichita.

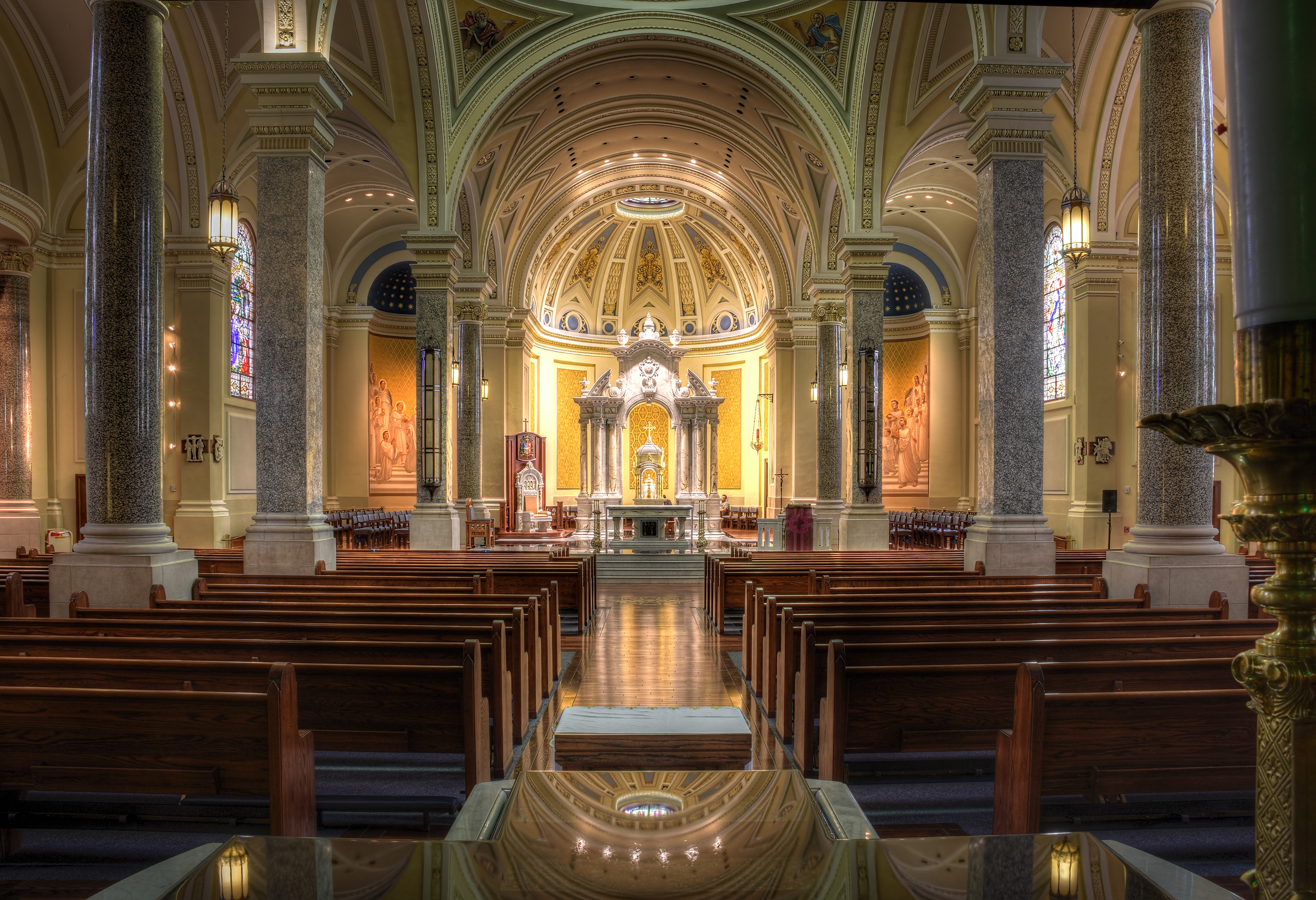
Interior of the Cathedral

The first Catholic church was constructed in Wichita in 1872. The cathedral parish was founded in 1887. The present cathedral church was begun in 1906 and it was consecrated on September 19, 1912. It was designed by Emmanuel Louis Masqueray. Cardinal James Gibbons of Baltimore dedicated the church in the presence of 30 other Catholic bishops. Archbishop John J. Glennon of St. Louis delivered the sermon. The cathedral was built at a cost of $500,000. The building was constructed of Bedford stone. It measures 169 feet (52 m) long and 100 feet (30 m) wide at the transepts. The dome is 135 feet (41 m) feet from the ground. The bronze doors, which were designed and created by Domus Dei of Italy, were installed in 1997.

== See also ==
- List of Catholic cathedrals in the United States
- List of cathedrals in the United States
