= John Reyly =

Irish politician (1646-1717)

Colonel John Reyly (sometimes spelt John Reilly) (c. 1646 – 17 February 1717) was elected Knight of the Shire or MP for the County Cavan, in the Patriot Parliament.

== Biography ==
He was the eldest son of Maelmora (Myles) O'Reilly and Catherine O'Reilly, daughter of Colonel Charles O'Reilly of County Leitrim. He seems to have been the first of the O'Reilly clan to have dropped the prefix "O" before the surname. He was described in 1713 as being formerly of Clonlyn, County Cavan, but as of then of Ballymacadd, County Meath and of Garryrocock, County Cavan (now the townland of Roebuck, parish of Kilbride, Barony of Clanmahon).

He married Margaret, daughter of Owen O'Reilly, Esq., by whom he had five sons and two daughters. The sons were, 1. Captain Conor, who died without issue in May 1723; 2. Myles Reilly, of the city of Dublin, merchant; 3. Brian Reilly; 4. Luke Reilly; 5. Thomas Reilly.

He died on 17 February 1717, and is buried in the old church of Kill, in the parish of Crosserlough, barony of Castlerahan, County Cavan, in a tomb bearing his family arms, which was still in good preservation in 1836. His grandson Alejandro O'Reilly distinguished himself in the Spanish army as one of the Wild Geese whose Catholic religion prevented him from serving in the mid-eighteenth-century Anglo-Irish army.

== Military career ==
Colonel Reyly raised a regiment of dragoons at his own expense for the Irish army in the service of King James II and assisted at the Siege of Derry in 1689. He had two engagements with Colonel Wolseley, the commander of the garrison of Belturbet, whom he signally defeated. He fought at the Battle of the Boyne in 1690 and the Battle of Aughrim in 1691. He was included in the articles of Treaty of Limerick of 1691, whereby he preserved his property, and was allowed to carry arms. According to An alphabetical List of the Names of such Persons of the Popish Religion, within the Kingdom of Ireland, who have Licenses to carry Arms, printed by Andrew Croke, printer to the Queen's most excellent Majesty, in Copper Alley, Dublin, 1713, it appears that Lieutenant-Colonel John Ryley, late of Clonlyn, in the county of Cavan, now of Ballymacadd, in the county of Meath, and Garryrocock, in the county of Cavan, had license to carry "1 sword, 1 case of pistols, and 1 gunn".
