= Philip Reyley =

Philip Reyley (recte O’Reilly) (c. 1630 – after 1689) was an M.P. for County Cavan in the Parliament of Ireland of 1689, known as the Patriot Parliament. He was known as Philip Reilly senior to distinguish him from Philip Og O'Reilly the contemporaneous MP for the borough of Cavan. He lived in Aghacreevy townland in the Civil Parish of Ballymachugh, Barony of Clanmahon, County Cavan. Reyley was probably the Philip Reilly senior who was elected a member of Cavan Corporation on 23 February 1688.
