= List of Irish MPs 1761–1768 =

This is a list of members of the Irish House of Commons between 1761 and 1768. There were 300 MPs at a time in this period, who sat from October 1761 to May 1768 unless stated otherwise.

Name	Constituency	Notes
Archibald Acheson	County Armagh	
Thomas Adderley	Bandonbridge	
James Agar	County Kilkenny	
Henry Alcock	Waterford City	
Henry Alcock	Clonmines	
William Alcock	Fethard (County Wexford)	1764–1768
Edward Stratford	Baltinglass	
John Stratford	Baltinglass	1761–1763 (ennobled 1763)
John Stratford	Baltinglass	1763–1768
Francis Andrews	Londonderry City	
John Gore	County Longford	1761–1765 (appointed Lord Chief Justice, 1764)
Francis Annesley	Downpatrick	
Mervyn Archdall	County Fermanagh	
Arthur Gore	County Wexford	
Sir Fitzgerald Aylmer	Roscommon	
Beauchamp Bagenal	Enniscorthy	
Samuel Bagshaw	Tallow	1761–1762 (died October 1762)
John Bagwell	Tulsk	
Bernard Ward	County Down	
Robert Barry	Charleville	
Roland Bateman	Tralee	
George Beresford	Coleraine	1761–1763 (ennobled 1763)
John Beresford	County Waterford	
Francis Bernard	Bandonbridge	1766–1768
Henry Bingham	Tuam	
Henry Bingham	Tuam	
Sir John Blackwood	Killyleagh	
John Blakeney	Athenry	1763–1768
Robert Blakeney	Athenry	1761–1762 (died December 1762)
John Blennerhassett	County Kerry	
John Blennerhassett	County Kerry	1762–1763 (died May 1763)
Thomas Bligh	Athboy	
Sir John Blunden	Kilkenny City	
Cornelius Bolton	Waterford City	
Sir Kildare Borrowes	County Kildare	
John Bourke	Old Leighlin	
John Bourke	Naas	1763–1768
Bellingham Boyle	Youghal	
Robert Boyle	Dungarvan	
Anthony Brabazon	County Dublin	
William Brabazon	County Wicklow	1765–1768
Sir Arthur Brooke	County Fermanagh	
Peter Browne-Kelly	County Mayo	
William Brownlow	County Armagh	
Richard Burgh	Naas	1761–1762 (died September 1762)
Benjamin Burton	County Carlow	1761–1767 (died October 1767)
Benjamin Burton	Boyle	1761–1763 (died May/June 1763)
Robert Burton	Carlow	1761–1765 (died January 1965)
Thomas Burton	Ennis	
William Henry Burton	Gowran	
Gervase Parker Bushe	Granard	1767–1768
Brinsley Butler	County Cavan	
John Butler	Newcastle	
Robert Butler	Belturbet	1761–1763 (died September 1763)
Sir Thomas Butler	County Carlow	
Lord Frederick Campbell	Thomastown	1767–1768 – Chief Secretary for Ireland, 1767–68
Thomas Carew	Dungarvan	
Edward Cary	County Londonderry	
Francis Caulfeild	Charlemont	
William Caulfeild	Tulsk	
Sir Henry Cavendish	Lismore	
Sir Henry Cavendish	Lismore	1766–1768
John Chichester	Belfast	
Michael Clarke	Ballyshannon	
William Clement	Dublin University	
Nathaniel Clements	Cavan	
William Clements	Baltimore	
William Fortescue	Monaghan	
Thomas Cobbe	Swords	
Dixie Coddington	Dunleer	1762–1768
Caesar Colclough	County Wexford	1761–1766 (died April 1766)
Vesey Colclough	County Wexford	1766–1768
Sir John Colthurst	Youghal	
John Congreve	Killyleagh	
William Conner	Bandonbridge	1761–1766 (died January 1766)
Thomas Conolly	County Londonderry	
Henry Seymour Conway	County Antrim	
Francis Burton	County Clare	
William Burton	Newtown Limavady	
Joshua Cooper	Castlebar	
Charles Coote	County Cavan	1761–1766 (ennobled September 1767)
Eyre Coote	Maryborough	1761
Maurice Copinger	Ardfert	
Dudley Cosby	Carrick	1763–1768
James Cotter	Askeaton	
John Cramer	Belturbet	
Lancelot Crosbie	Ardfert	1762–1768
William Crosbie	Ardfert	1761–1762 (ennobled 1762)
James Stopford	Taghmon	
Richard Cox	Clonakilty	
John Curtis	Ratoath	
Charles Daly	County Galway	
Denis Daly	Galway	1767–1768
James Daly	Athenry	
Marriot Dalway	Carrickfergus	
John Damer	Portarlington	
John Dawson	Portarlington	1766–1768
Richard Dawson	Monaghan	
William Dawson	Queen's County	
Joseph Deane	Inistioge	
Sir Robert Deane	Tallow	
Sir Compton Domvile	Carlow	
Robert Doyne	Carlow	1765–1768
Robert Doyne	Donegal	
Henry Prittie	Banagher	1767–1768
George Dunbar	Gowran	
Arthur Hill	County Down	1761–1766 (ennobled February 1766)
William Cole	Enniskillen	1761–1767 (ennobled November 1767)
Abraham Creighton	Lifford	
John Creighton	Lifford	
Thomas Dawson	County Monaghan	
John Eyre	Galway	
Thomas Eyre	Thomastown	
Barry Maxwell	Armagh	
Ralph Fetherston	County Longford	1765–1768
Garret FitzGerald	Kildare	
Maurice FitzGerald	Dingle	
Richard Fitzgerald	Boyle	1763–1768
Robert FitzGerald	Dingle	
William FitzGerald	Dublin City	1767–1768
John FitzGibbon	Newcastle	
Thomas Fitzmaurice	County Kerry	1763–1768
Richard FitzPatrick	Galway	1761–1767 (died July 1767)
Henry Flood	Callan	1762–1768
Jocelyn Flood	Callan	1765–1767 (died May 1767)
John Flood	Callan	1767–1768
John Folliot	Sligo	1761–1762 (died February 1762)
John Folliott	Kinsale	1761–1765 (died January 1765)
George Forbes	St Johnstown (County Longford)	1762–1768
John Forbes	Mullingar	
Mathew Forde	Downpatrick	
James Fortescue	County Louth	
William Forward	St Johnstown (County Donegal)	
Anthony Foster	County Louth	1761–1766
John Foster	Dunleer	
William Fownes	Knocktopher	
John Redmond Freke	Cork City	1761–1764 (died April 1764)
Robert French	Carrick	
George Forbes	Mullingar	1761–1765 (ennobled 1765)
John French	County Roscommon	
William Gilbert	Maryborough	1761–1764 (died January 1764)
James Gisborne	Tallow	1762–1768
Henry Gore	Lanesborough	
Paul Annesley Gore	County Sligo	1765–1768
Richard Gore	Castlebar	
Richard Gorges	Enniskillen	
Hamilton Gorges	Swords	
Richard Gorges	Enniskillen	1767–1768
John Graham	Drogheda	
James Grattan	Dublin City	1761–1766 (died June 1766)
John Grogan	Enniscorthy	
Roger Hall	Newry	
Henry Hamilton	Londonderry City	
John Stuart Hamilton	Strabane	1763–1768
Robert Hamilton	Bangor	
William Hamilton	Strabane	1761–1762 (died 1762)
William Gerard Hamilton	Killybegs	Chief Secretary for Ireland, 1761–64
John Gustavus Handcock	Ballyshannon	1761–1766 (died February 1766)
William Handcock	Athlone	
Arthur Pomeroy	County Kildare	
Robert Harman	County Longford	1761–1765 (died September 1765)
George Hartpole	Portarlington	1761–1763 (died December 1763)
William Harward	Lanesborough	
John Hely	Cork City	
Edward Herbert	Tralee	
Francis Ingram	Lisburn	Chief Secretary for Ireland, 1765–66
Joseph Hoare	Askeaton	
John Hobson	Inistioge	
Peter Holmes	Banagher	
Walter Hore	Taghmon	
Ralph Howard	County Wicklow	
Henry Loftus	Bannow	
John Hyde	County Carlow	1767–1768
Richard Jackson	Coleraine	
Denham Jephson	Mallow	
William Jephson	Mallow	
Arthur Jones	Wexford	
Richard Jones	Killybegs	
Theophilus Jones	County Leitrim	Chief Secretary for Ireland, 1767
Maurice Keating	Naas	
Henry King	Boyle	
Sir Edward King	County Sligo	1761–1764
Andrew Knox	County Donegal	
John Knox	Donegal	
Thomas Knox	Dungannon	
Thomas Knox	Dungannon	
Gustavus Lambart	Kilbeggan	
David La Touche	Dundalk	
Hercules Langrishe	Knocktopher	
Thomas Le Hunte	Wexford	
Francis Leigh	Drogheda	
Robert Leigh	New Ross	
Robert Clements	County Donegal	1765–1768
Edmond Leslie-Corry	Newtown Limavady	1761–1764 (died November 1764)
Godfrey Lill	Fore	
Edward Loftus	Jamestown	
Nicholas Hume-Loftus	Fethard (County Wexford)	1761–1763
Nicholas Hume	Fethard (County Wexford)	1761–1766 (ennobled October 1966)
Edward Pakenham	County Longford	1765–1766
Richard Longfield	Charleville	
Samuel Lowe	Clogher	1761–1765 (died 1765)
George Lowther	Ratoath	
Gorges Lowther	County Meath	
Sir Marcus Lowther-Crofton	Roscommon	
Robert Lowry	Strabane	1761–1764 (died August 1964)
Galbraith Lowry-Corrie	County Tyrone	
Charles Bingham	County Mayo	
Charles Lucas	Dublin City	
Edward Lucas	County Monaghan	
John Ludford	Belfast	
Henry Lyons	King's County	
John Lysaght	County Cork	1765–1768
Thomas Mahon	County Roscommon	
John Monck Mason	Blessington	
Hugh Massy	County Limerick	
James May	County Waterford	
Alexander McAuley	Thomastown	1761–1766 (died July 1766)
Charles MacDonnell	County Clare	1766–1768
John Magill	Castlemartyr	
Anthony Malone	Castlemartyr	
Edmond Malone	Granard	1761–1767
Thomas Maude	County Tipperary	
William Mayne	Carysfort	
James McManus	Athy	Apr–Oct, 1761 (died October 1761)
Sir John Meade	Banagher	1764–1766
Henry Mitchell	Bannow	
Hugh Henry Mitchell	Ballyshannon	1766–1768
Sir Capel Molyneux	Clogher	
George Paul Monck	Coleraine	1763–1768
Henry Monck	Duleek	
George Montgomery	Strabane	1765–1768
William Montgomery	Hillsborough	
William Montgomery	Augher	
Colville Moore	Clonmel	
Henry William Moore	Charlemont	1761–1762 (died ?May 1762)
Richard Moore	Kells	
Stephen Moore	Fethard (County Tipperary)	
Stephen Moore	Lismore	1761–1766 (ennobled February 1766)
Guy Moore	Clonmel	
William Moore	Clogher	1765–1768
Redmond Morres	Newtownards	
William Evans Morres	Kilkenny City	
Eland Mossom	St Canice	
James Moutray	Augher	
George Needham	Newry	
Cosby Nesbitt	Cavan	
Charles Newcomen	St Johnstown (County Longford)	
John Newenham	Fore	
Edward Nicholson	Old Leighlin	
Sir Edward O'Brien	County Clare	1761–1765 (died November 1765)
Sir Lucius O'Brien	Ennis	
Murrough O'Brien	Harristown	
Cornelius O'Callaghan	Fethard (County Tipperary)	
Charles O'Hara	Ballynakill	
Charles O'Neill	Randalstown	
John O'Neill	Randalstown	
Silver Oliver	Kilmallock	
William Ormsby	Sligo	
Sir William Osborne	Carysfort	
Roger Palmer	Jamestown	
Sir John Parnell	Maryborough	December 1761 – 1768
Sir John Parnell	Bangor	1767–1768
Sir William Parsons	King's County	
Wentworth Parsons	County Longford	1766–1768
Marcus Paterson	Ballynakill	
Kingsmill Pennefather	Cashel	
Richard Pennefather	Cashel	
Thomas Pepper	Kells	
Robert Perceval	Trim	
Edmund Pery	Limerick City	
John Pigott	Banagher	1761–1763 (died December 1763)
William Pole	Queen's County	
John Pomeroy	Trim	
John Ponsonby	County Kilkenny	
Richard Ponsonby	Newtownards	
William Ponsonby	Cork City	1764–1768
John Preston	Navan	
Joseph Preston	Navan	
Francis Price	Lisburn	
Henry Prittie	County Tipperary	
Abel Ram	Gorey	
Andrew Ram	Duleek	
Robert Rochford	Philipstown	
George Rochfort	County Westmeath	
Richard Rochfort	County Westmeath	
Robert Ross	Carlingford	
Ralph Gore	County Donegal	1761–1764 (died June 1764)
Robert Cuninghame	Armagh	
Hercules Langford Rowley	County Meath	
Charles Ruxton	Ardee	
John Ruxton	Ardee	
Robert Scott	Sligo	1762–1768
Henry Seymour-Conway	County Down	1766–1768
Richard Boyle	County Cork	1761–1764 (ennobled December 1764)
William Petty	County Kerry	1761 (ennobled May 1761-never sat)
Edward Sandford	Harristown	
Henry Sanford	Kildare	
Robert Sandford	Athy	
Henry Sheares	Clonakilty	
Robert Sibthorpe	Granard	
Stephen Sibthorpe	County Louth	1767–1768
Hugh Skeffington	County Antrim	
Hungerford Skeffington	Antrim	
William Smith	Athy	1762–1768
Charles Smyth	Limerick City	
James Smyth	Antrim	
Edward Southwell	Kinsale	
Thomas Southwell	County Limerick	1761–1766 (ennobled November 1766)
Thomas Southwell	County Limerick	1767–1768
Henry St George	Athlone	1761–1763 (died July 1763)
Richard St George	Athlone	1763–1768
St George St George	Carrick	1761–1763 (ennobled April 1763)
John St Leger	Doneraile	
St Leger St Leger	Doneraile	
John Staples	Newtown Limavady	1765–1768
Richard Steele	Mullingar	1765–1768
Annesley Stewart	Charlemont	1763–1768
William Stewart	County Tyrone	
William Stewart	County Cavan	1766–1768
William Talbot	St Johnstown (County Donegal)	
Thomas Tennison	Dunleer	1761 (appointed Judge 1761)
Edward Tighe	Belturbet	1763–1768
Richard Stearne Tighe	Athy	December 1761 (died December 1761)
Richard William Tighe	Wicklow	1767–1768
William Tighe	Wicklow	1761–1766 (died September 1766)
William Tighe	Athboy	
Thomas Tipping	Kilbeggan	
Philip Tisdall	Dublin University	
Richard Tonson	Baltimore	
Blayney Townley-Balfour	Carlingford	
Richard Townsend	County Cork	
Charles Tottenham	New Ross	
Charles Tottenham	Clonmines	
John Tottenham	Fethard (County Wexford)	1767–1768
Richard Trench	County Galway	
Arthur Trevor	Hillsborough	
Stephen Trotter	Gorey	
Duke Tyrell	Philipstown	
Arthur Upton	Carrickfergus	
Charles Ussher	Blessington	
Agmondesham Vesey	Kinsale	1765–1768
Edward Villiers	Kilmallock	
Thomas Waite	St Canice	
Robert Waller	Dundalk	
Hunt Walsh	Maryborough	1764–1768
Robert Ward	Bangor	1761–1767 (died December 1767)
James Wemys	Callan	1762–1765 (died April 1765)
William Whitshed	Wicklow	
Richard Wingfield	County Wicklow	1761–1764 (ennobled May 1764)
Richard Wolseley	Carlow	
John Wynne	County Leitrim	
Owen Wynne	County Sligo	
