= Viscount Bangor =

Title in the peerage of Ireland

Viscountcy of Bangor
- Quarterly: 1st and 4th, azure, a cross patonce or (for Ward); 2nd and 3rd, gules, three cinquefoils ermine, on a chief of the second a man's heart of the first (for Hamilton)
- Creation date: 11 January 1781
- Created by: King George III
- Peerage: Peerage of Ireland
- First holder: Bernard Ward, 1st Baron Bangor
- Present holder: William Ward, 8th Viscount
- Heir presumptive: Hon. Edward Nicholas Ward
- Remainder to: the 1st Viscount's heirs male of the body lawfully begotten.
- Subsidiary titles: Baron Bangor
- Seat: Castle Ward
- Motto: Sub cruce salus ("Salvation under the cross")

Viscount Bangor, of Castle Ward, in County Down, is a title in the Peerage of Ireland.

== History ==
The title was created in January 1781 for Bernard Ward, 1st Baron Bangor, who had previously represented County Down in the Irish House of Commons. He had already been created Baron Bangor, of Castle Ward in the County of Down, in May 1770, also in the Peerage of Ireland.

His son, the second Viscount, sat as a member of the Irish Parliament for Bangor and was declared insane. He was succeeded by his younger brother, the third Viscount. His eldest son, the fourth Viscount, sat in the House of Lords as an Irish representative peer from 1855 to 1881. His younger brother, the fifth Viscount, was an Irish Representative Peer from 1886 to 1911. His son, the sixth Viscount, was an Irish Representative Peer between 1913 and 1950 and also sat in the Senate of Northern Ireland from 1921 to 1950 and served as its Speaker from 1930 to 1950. As of 2017, the titles are held by his grandson, the eighth Viscount, who succeeded his father, journalist Edward Ward, in 1993.

Nicholas Ward, great-grandfather of the first Viscount, and Michael Ward, father of the first Viscount, both represented County Down in the Irish House of Commons. Robert Ward, uncle of Nicholas Ward, was created a Baronet in 1682 (see Ward Baronets). The Hon. Edward Ward, second son of the first Viscount, was also a member of the Irish Parliament for County Down. Edward Wolstenholme Ward, a son of John Petty Ward, younger brother of the third Viscount, sat in the New South Wales Legislative Council. The actress Lalla Ward is the daughter of the seventh Viscount and the former wife of both Professor Richard Dawkins and her Doctor Who co-star Tom Baker

The family seat is Castle Ward, near Strangford, County Down.

== Baron Bangor (1770) ==
- Bernard Ward, 1st Baron Bangor (1719–1781) (created Viscount Bangor in 1781)

=== Viscount Bangor (1781) ===
- Bernard Ward, 1st Viscount Bangor (1719–1781)
- Nicholas Ward, 2nd Viscount Bangor (1750–1827)
- Edward Ward, 3rd Viscount Bangor (1790–1837)
- Edward Ward, 4th Viscount Bangor (1827–1881)
- Henry William Crosbie Ward, 5th Viscount Bangor (1828–1911)
- Maxwell Richard Crosbie Ward, 6th Viscount Bangor (1868–1950)
- Edward Henry Harold Ward, 7th Viscount Bangor (1905–1993)
- William Maxwell David Ward, 8th Viscount Bangor (born 1948)

The heir presumptive is the present holder's half-brother, Hon. Edward Nicholas Ward (born 1953).

The heir presumptive's heir presumptive is his cousin Maxwell Colin Bernard Ward (born 1949), a great-great-grandson of the third Viscount. His heir is his elder son Charles Bernard Maxwell Ward (born 1986).

== Notes ==
=== External links ===
- Hesilrige, Arthur G. M. (1921). Debrett's Peerage and Titles of courtesy. London: London: Dean & son, limited. p. 88.
