= Arthur Trevor =

Arthur Trevor may refer to:

- Arthur Trevor (MP), Irish politician
- Arthur Trevor (cricketer), English cricketer
- Arthur Trevor (civil servant), British administrator and civil servant in British India

== See also ==
- Arthur Hill-Trevor (disambiguation)
