= Nicholas Ward =

Nicholas Ward may refer to:

- Nicholas Ward, 2nd Viscount Bangor (1750–1827), Irish politician and peer
- Nicholas Ward (boxer) (1811–1850), English bare-knuckle fighter
- Nicholas Ward (Irish politician) (1630–unknown), Irish MP for Downpatrick
- Nicholas Ward, English violinist and musical director of the Northern Chamber Orchestra from 1985–2022

== See also ==
- Nick Ward (disambiguation)
