= John Meade (British Army officer) =

Irish officer in the British Army

Lieutenant-General John Meade CB (c. 1775 – 6 August 1849) was an Irish officer in the British Army. After leaving the professional army he served as a militia officer in Ireland, and sat in the House of Commons of the United Kingdom for twelve years before taking up a diplomatic post.

== Early life and family ==
Born around 1775, Meade was the third son of John Meade, 1st Viscount Clanwilliam (later 1st Earl of Clanwilliam). His mother Theodosia was a daughter and co-heir of Robert Hawkins Magill, who sat in the Irish House of Commons for County Down from 1724 to 1745.

== Military and political career ==
Meade joined the British Army on 30 October 1794, as an ensign in Lieutenant-Colonel Macnamara's Regiment. He was transferred to Lieutenant-Colonel Ward's Regiment and promoted to lieutenant on 12 November 1794. After that regiment was disbanded in 1795, he joined the 12th Regiment of Foot. In June 1796, he sailed aboard the Rockingham East Indiaman, going out with the regiment to India.

Meade was briefly put up as a candidate for County Down for the 1797 election. His mother had inherited estates at Gilford and Rathfriland which gave the family a small electoral interest there under her management. After Meade's announcement, the anti-Unionist Lord Downshire and the Unionist Lord Londonderry, holders of the largest electoral interests in the county, agreed to combine against him and split the two county seats between them, avoiding the enormous expense of a contested election. In the face of this coalition, the Countess withdrew Meade's candidacy.

He was promoted to a captain in the 9th Regiment of Foot on 27 August 1799 and took part in the Helder Expedition and the Ferrol Expedition, then with the rest of Sir James Pulteney's command to Lisbon. On 4 June 1801, he purchased a commission as major in the 30th Regiment of Foot. Meade was promoted from the 30th to become a lieutenant-colonel in the 16th Garrison Battalion, in Ireland, on 8 December 1804. (Note: The Royal Military Calendar claims that he was commissioned lieutenant-colonel in the 18th Dragoons, but this is contradicted by contemporary gazettings.) He went on half-pay when that regiment was disbanded in February 1805 and was appointed to the lieutenant-colonelcy of the 45th Regiment of Foot on 30 March 1805.

In 1805, an electoral struggle broke out in Down, site of the Meade family's remaining estates. The sitting MP Robert Stewart, Viscount Castlereagh (son of Lord Londonderry) was a close confidant of the Prime Minister William Pitt the Younger, and was obliged to seek re-election when he was appointed as Secretary of State for War and the Colonies. Castlereagh had alienated the dowager Lady Downshire, the county's biggest landowner, who determined to contest the by-election with her own candidate. John's mother Lady Clanwilliam agreed to join with Lady Downshire in promoting his candidacy against Castlereagh. The Londonderry and Downshire interests spent lavishly: the Downshires may have spent as much as £30,000 (equivalent to £2.24 million in 2025) on the by-election in July 1805, from which Meade emerged victorious, giving Lady Downshire control of both the county's seats.

In the Commons, Meade voted with the opposition until 1812. He took leave from Parliament to fight in the Peninsular War in 1810, and commanded the 45th at the Battle of Bussaco. However, he was present in Parliament, and not with the regiment, during the 1812 campaign. Meade retired from active service in June 1813. By then the Downshire and Londonderry interests had reached a truce, so Meade switched his support to the government. He was appointed a brevet-colonel on 4 June 1813, and made a Companion of the Bath on 4 June 1815.

On 2 October 1816, he married Urania Caroline (died November 1851), the daughter of Edward Ward, by whom he had four sons.

- Capt. John Meade (1824–bef. 1894?)
- Maj. Richard Raphael Meade (1826–1873), married and left children
- Henry Meade (d. 13 July 1864)
- Edward Meade (1830 – 16 January 1882)

== Diplomat ==
Meade resigned his seat in 1817 to make way for Lord Arthur Hill, and was appointed British consul-general in Spain, an office he retained until its abolition in 1832. On 12 August 1819, he was brevetted major-general, and, on 10 January 1837, lieutenant-general. He died in Madrid on 6 August 1849.

== Notes ==
Parliament of the United Kingdom
Preceded by Viscount Castlereagh; Francis Savage	Member of Parliament for Down; 1805–1817; With: Francis Savage to May 1812; Hon. Robert Ward May–October 1812; Viscount Castlereagh from October 1812	Succeeded by Lord Arthur Hill; Viscount Castlereagh
