= Killyleagh (Parliament of Ireland constituency) =

Pre-1801 Irish constituency

Coordinates: 54.401°N 5.649°W

- Former borough constituency for the Irish House of Commons
- County: County Down
- Borough: Killyleagh

1613–1801
- Seats: 2
- Replaced by: Disfranchised

Killyleagh was a constituency represented in the Irish House of Commons until 1800. It was named for the village of Killyleagh.

== History ==
In the Patriot Parliament of 1689 summoned by James II, Killyleagh was represented with two members.

== Members of Parliament, 1613–1801 ==
- 1613–1615 Sir Edward Trevor and John Hamilton
- 1634–1635 Paul Reynolds and John Hamilton
- 1639–1649 Paul Reynolds and George Nettleton
- 1661–1666 Colyn Maxwell and John Swadlyn

=== 1689–1801 ===
Election	First MP	Second MP
1689	Bernard Magennis	Tool O'Neile
1692	Sir Patrick Dun	James Sloane
1695	Hans Hamilton	James Sloane
1703	Hans Stevenson	John Haltridge
1713	James Stevenson	John Haltridge
1715	Robert Ross	John Haltridge
1725	Robert Ross	James Stevenson
1727	James Stevenson	James Stevenson
1739	Alexander Hamilton	James Stevenson
1761	Bernard Ward (Note: Also elected for County Down in 1761, for which he chose to sit)	John Congreve
1761	John Blackwood	John Congreve
1768	Viscount Ikerrin	Sir Archibald Acheson, 6th Bt (Note: Also elected for County Armagh in 1768, for which he chose to sit)
1769	Viscount Ikerrin	Arthur Johnston
1774	Hon. Pierce Butler	Arthur Johnston
1776	Sir John Blackwood, 2nd Bt	Robert Blackwood
1788	Sir John Blackwood, 2nd Bt	James Stevenson Blackwood (Note: Succeeded as 3rd Baronet in 1799)
1790	Hon. Robert Ward	James Stevenson Blackwood
1798	Sir John Blackwood, 2nd Bt	James Stevenson Blackwood
1799	Hans Blackwood	James Stevenson Blackwood
1800	Daniel Mussenden	James Stevenson Blackwood
1801	Disenfranchised	

== Bibliography ==
- O'Hart, John (2007). The Irish and Anglo-Irish Landed Gentry: When Cromwell came to Ireland. Vol. II. Heritage Books. ISBN 978-0-7884-1927-0.
- Leigh Rayment's historical List of Members of the Irish House of Commons. Cites: Johnston-Liik, Edith Mary (2002). The History of the Irish Parliament 1692-1800 (6 volumes). Ulster Historical Foundation.
