= Arthur Hill-Trevor =

Arthur Hill-Trevor may refer to:

- Arthur Hill-Trevor, 1st Viscount Dungannon (c. 1694–1771), Irish politician
- Arthur Hill-Trevor, 1st Baron Trevor (1819–1894)
- Arthur Hill-Trevor, 3rd Viscount Dungannon (1798–1862)

== See also ==
- Arthur Hill (disambiguation)
- Arthur Trevor (disambiguation)
