= Robert Henry Southwell =

Irish politician

Robert Henry Southwell (October 1745 – 29 August 1817), styled The Honourable from 1766, was an Irish politician.

He was the second son of Thomas Southwell, 1st Viscount Southwell and his wife Margaret Hamilton, daughter of Arthur Cecil Hamilton. Southwell served as lieutenant-colonel of the 8th Dragoons. In 1776, he entered the Irish House of Commons for Downpatrick, representing the constituency until 1783.

In 1786, he married Frideswide Moore, daughter of John Moore, and had by her a son and a daughter. Southwell died at Clontarf, Dublin.

Parliament of Ireland
Preceded by Mathew Forde; Clotworthy Rowley	Member of Parliament for Downpatrick; 1776–1783; With: Clotworthy Rowley	Succeeded by Hon. Hercules Rowley; Clotworthy Rowley
