= Castleward Forest =

Woodland in Northern Ireland

- Location within Northern Ireland
- Interactive map of Castleward Forest

Geography
- Location: Down, Northern Ireland, United Kingdom
- Coordinates: 54°21′54″N 5°35′45″W
- Area: 75.31 hectares (186.1 acres)

Administration
- Authority: National Trust

Castleward Forest is a woodland located beside Castle Ward near Strangford, Northern Ireland. It consists of coniferous and deciduous trees. The forest is managed by the National Trust.
