= Trevor Hill, 1st Viscount Hillsborough =

Anglo-Irish landowner and politician

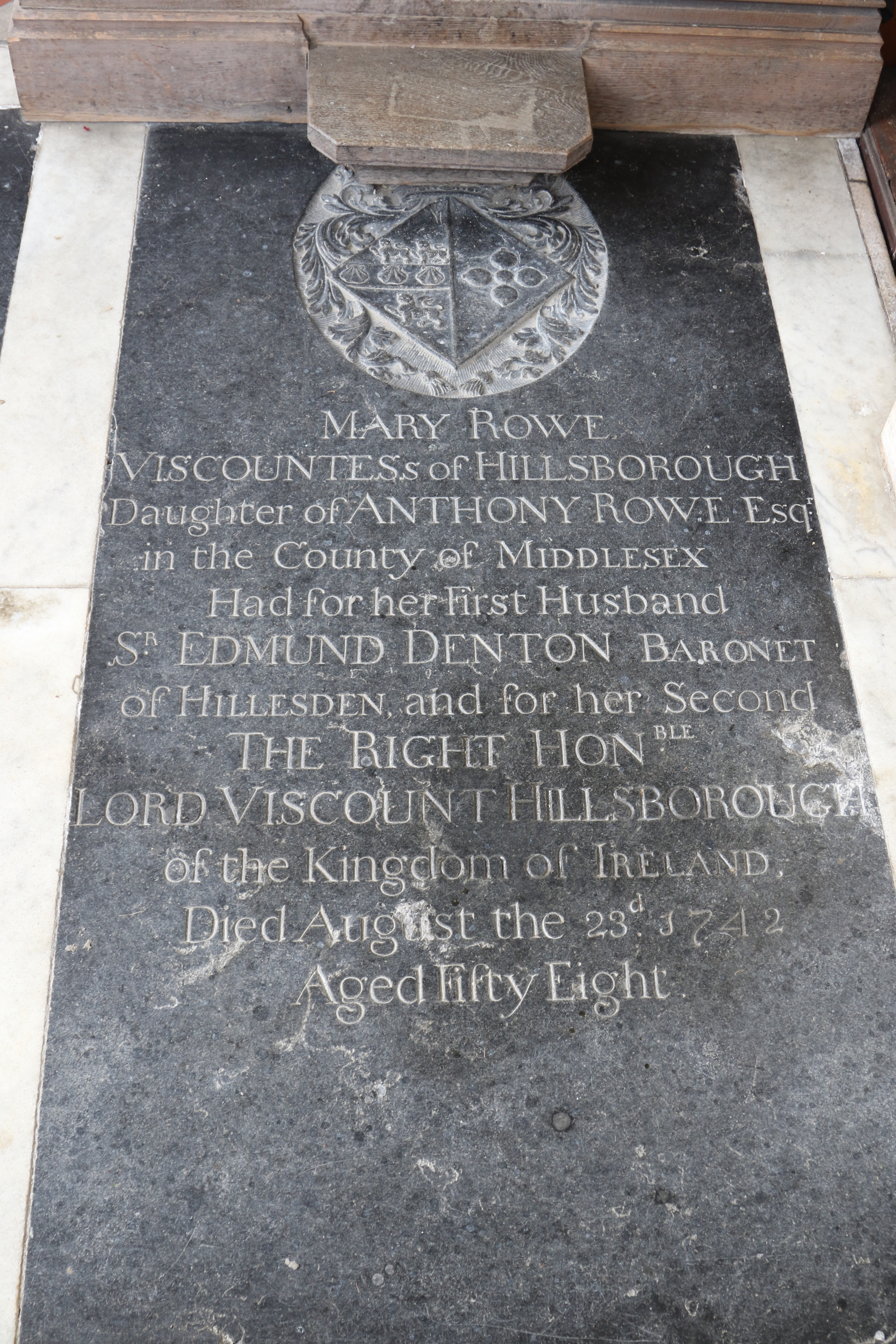
Ledger stone of Mary Rowe, wife of Trevor Hill, 1st Viscount Hillsborough, All Saints' Church, Hillesden

Trevor Hill, 1st Viscount Hillsborough (1693 – 5 May 1742) was an Anglo-Irish landowner and politician who sat in the Irish House of Commons from 1713 to 1715 and in the British House of Commons from 1715 to 1722.

Hill was the eldest son of Michael Hill of Hillsborough and his wife Anne Trevor, daughter of Sir John Trevor, MP of Brynkinalt, Denbighshire. He was a member of an influential landowning family of County Down, Ireland. His father died in 1699 and Hill succeeded to his estates. He married sometime before 1717, Mary Rowe, widow of Sir Edmund Denton, 1st Baronet of Hillesden and eldest daughter and co-heiress of Anthony Rowe (c. 1641-1704) of Muswell Hill, Middlesex, MP.

Hill represented Hillsborough in the Irish House of Commons from 1713 to 1715 and subsequently County Down from 1715 until 1717, when he was raised to the Peerage of Ireland as Baron Hill of Kilwarlin, in the County of Down, and Viscount Hillsborough. He became an Irish Privy Councillor on 20 September 1717.

At the 1715 British general election he stood unsuccessfully as a Whig for Saltash, but three months later was returned as Member of Parliament for Aylesbury at a by-election on 30 April 1715. In 1722 his friend, the Duke of Wharton returned him as MP for Malmesbury, but he was unseated on petition on 13 December 1722. He was defeated at a by-election at Appleby in 1723, and did not stand for Parliament again. He was appointed Governor of County Down in 1729.

Hill had charm but a poor reputation as a wanton and profligate. He tried to recuperate his debts by gambling on horses, and was one of a party of men that were given a whipping by a carter offended by their riding naked with young ladies around Buckinghamshire.

Lord Hillsborough died aged 48 in May 1742. He had four sons and two daughters and was succeeded in the titles by his son Wills, who became a prominent statesman. His brother Arthur Hill succeeded to the Trevor estates through their mother and was created Baron Hill and Viscount Dungannon in 1765.

Parliament of Ireland
Preceded by William Richardson; Samuel Waring	Member of Parliament for Hillsborough; 1713–1715; With: Samuel Waring	Succeeded by Arthur Hill; Samuel Waring
Preceded by Michael Ward; Nicholas Price	Member of Parliament for County Down; 1715–1717; With: Michael Ward	Succeeded by Michael Ward; Sir John Rawdon
Parliament of Great Britain
Preceded by John Deacle; Nathaniel Meade	Member of Parliament for Aylesbury; 1715 – 1722; With: Nathaniel Mead	Succeeded by John Guise; Richard Abell
Preceded by Fleetwood Dormer; Sir John Rushout	Member of Parliament for Malmesbury; 1722; With: Sir John Rushout	Succeeded by John Fermor; Giles Earle
Peerage of Ireland
New creation	Viscount Hillsborough; 1717–1742	Succeeded by Wills Hill
