= Robert Ward (1754–1831) =

Irish politician and colonel

Col. Robert Ward PC (Ire) (14 July 1754 – March 1831), styled The Honourable from 1770, was an Irish politician and colonel of the South Down militia.

== Background ==
He was the fourth son of Bernard Ward, 1st Viscount Bangor and his wife Lady Ann Bligh, daughter of John Bligh, 1st Earl of Darnley and his wife Theodosia Bligh, 10th Baroness Clifton. His older brothers were Nicholas Ward, 2nd Viscount Bangor and Edward Ward. Following the latter's death in 1812, he conveyed the by-that-time-insane 2nd Viscount out of his residence Castle Ward and plundered it.

== Career ==
He entered the Irish House of Commons in 1777, sitting for the borough of Wicklow until 1783. Ward was elected for Killyleagh in 1790 and represented it until 1798, when he was returned for Bangor, the family's customary constituency, until the Act of Union in 1801. In November of the latter year, he was sworn of the Privy Council of Ireland. He was appointed High Sheriff of Down for 1792–93.

Ward was a trustee of the Irish Linen Board and from 1805 was Governor of County Down. In 1800, he became the first colonel of the new established South Downshire Militia. Ward won a by-election to the British House of Commons for Down in May 1812, however he did not stand in the next general election in October.

== Family ==
In May 1782, he married firstly, Sophia Frances Whaley, third daughter of Richard Chapel Whaley, and had by her four sons and a daughter. She died in 1793 and Ward married secondly, Louisa Jane Symes, second daughter of Reverend Abraham Symes, four years later. By his second wife, he had four sons and two daughters Ward died in 1831, aged 76. His oldest son Edward was a diplomat and his fifth son James a vice-admiral in the Royal Navy. His daughter Anne-Catherine married the barrister John Goddard Richards of Ardamine Estate, County Wexford.

Parliament of Ireland
| Preceded by Edward Tighe; Sir William Fownes, 2nd Bt | Member of Parliament for Wicklow; 1777–1783; With: Sir William Fownes, 2nd Bt 1777–1778; George Ponsonby 1778–1783 | Succeeded by John Lloyd; Edward Tighe |
| Preceded by Sir John Blackwood, 2nd Bt; James Stevenson Blackwood | Member of Parliament for Killyleagh; 1790–1798; With: James Stevenson Blackwood | Succeeded by Sir John Blackwood, 2nd Bt; James Stevenson Blackwood |
| Preceded by Sir John Blackwood, 2nd Bt; John Keane | Member of Parliament for Bangor; 1798–1801; With: John Stewart | Succeeded by Parliament of the United Kingdom |
Parliament of the United Kingdom
| Preceded by John Meade; Francis Savage | Member of Parliament for Down; May–October 1812; With: John Meade | Succeeded by John Meade; Viscount Castlereagh |
