= Malby Brabazon =

Irish politician (1588–1637)

Malby Brabazon (1588 – 20 May 1637) was an Irish politician.

Brabazon was born in 1588, in County Roscommon, and educated at Trinity College, Dublin. He was MP for Bangor from the opening of parliament on 14 July 1634 until his death on 20 May 1637.
