= Sir William Cooper, 1st Baronet =

Sir William Cooper, 1st Baronet (c.1689–1761) was an Irish lawyer and politician.

== Life ==
The son of Thomas Cooper, he was admitted to the King's Inns as an attorney of the Court of King's Bench. He became a master in chancery in 1739, a position he held to 1754. He was Member of the Irish Parliament for Hillsborough from 1733 until his death.

The Cooper baronetcy of the City of Dublin was created in the Baronetage of Ireland on 3 October 1758 specifically for Cooper. The title became extinct on his death in 1761. His wife Elizabeth Forster died in 1766.
