= Bernard Ward, 1st Viscount Bangor =

Irish politician and peer (1719–1781)

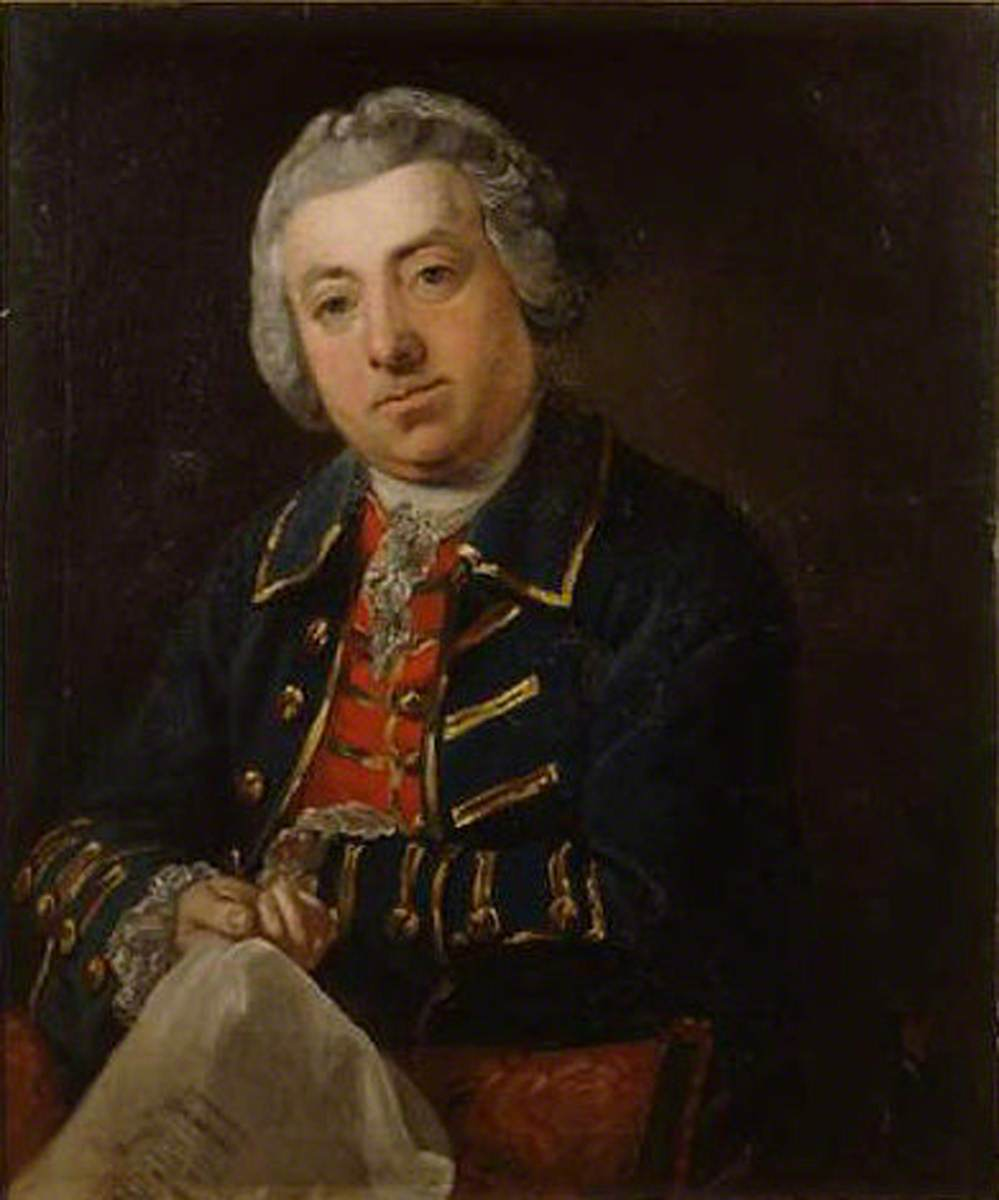
The 1st Viscount Bangor

Bernard Ward, 1st Viscount Bangor (18 August 1719 – 20 May 1781), was an Irish politician and peer.

== Background ==
He was the only surviving son of Michael Ward of Castle Ward, County Down, a justice of the Court of King's Bench, and his wife Anne Catharina Hamilton, daughter of James Hamilton of Bangor and Lady Sophia Mordaunt.

== Life and career ==
Ward entered the Irish House of Commons in 1745, representing County Down, the same constituency his father had represented, until 1770, when he was raised to the Peerage of Ireland as Baron Bangor, of Castle Ward, in the County of Down. In 1761, he was also elected for Killyleagh and in 1768 for Bangor, however, chose not to sit both times. Ward was further honoured in 1781, when he was created Viscount Bangor, of Castle Ward, in the County of Down.

== Family ==
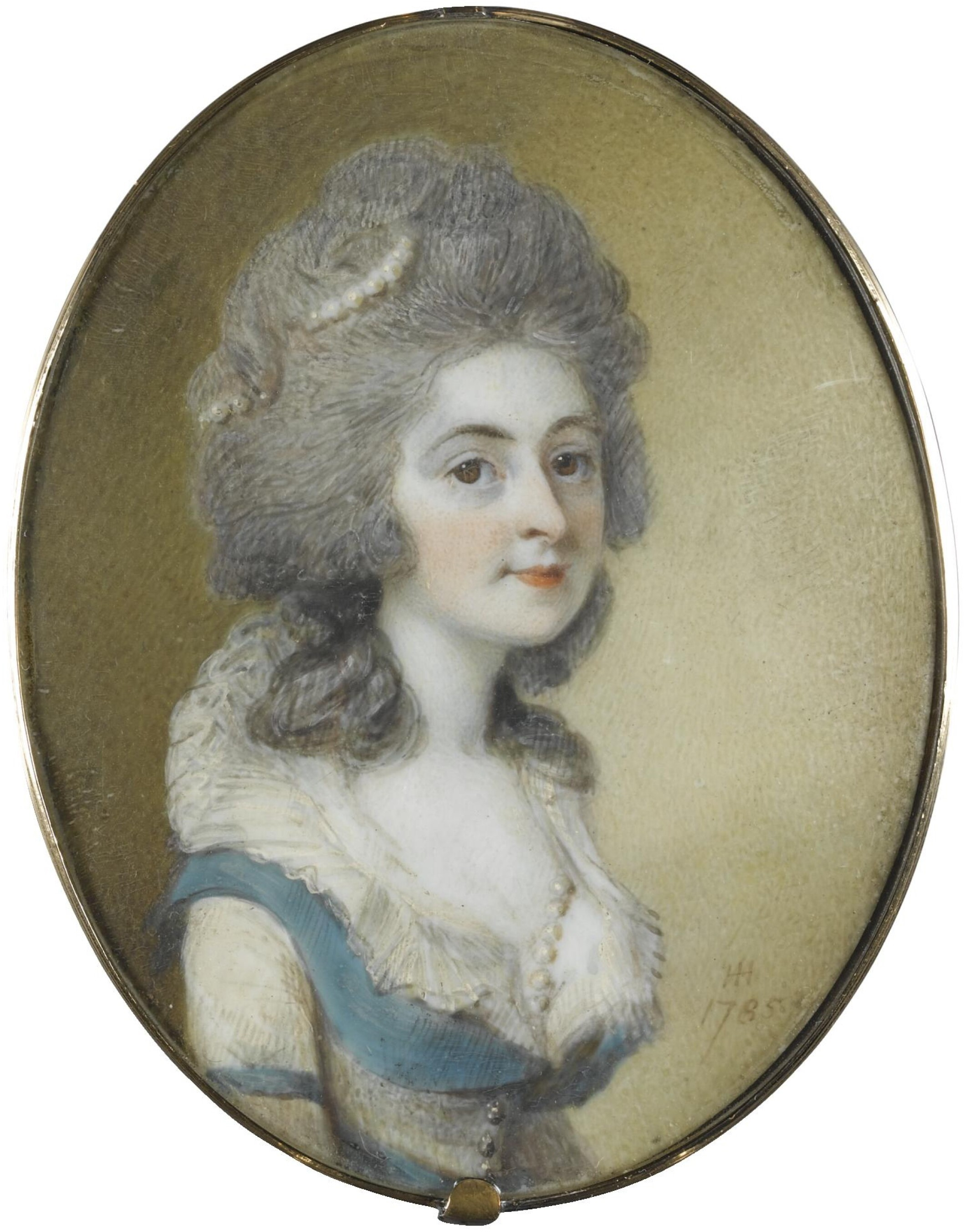
Portrait of the Hon. Sophia Ward, miniature by Horace Hone, 1785.

In December 1747, he married Lady Ann Magill, daughter of John Bligh, 1st Earl of Darnley, and his wife Theodosia Bligh, 10th Baroness Clifton (the widow of Robert Magill of Gill Hall), and had by her four sons and four daughters:

- Nicholas Ward, 2nd Viscount Bangor (1750–1827)
- John Ward, died young
- Hon. Edward Ward (1753–1812)
- Hon. Robert Ward (1754–1831)
- Hon. Anna Catharine Ward
- Hon. Sophia Ward
- Hon. Amelia Ward, married Rev. Hugh Montgomery
- Hon. Harriet Ward

Ward died, aged 61, at his seat Castle Ward. He was succeeded in his titles by his oldest son Nicholas, later placed under disability due to insanity. Both his third son, Edward, and fourth son, Robert, sat in the Parliament of Ireland.

Ward undertook the reconstruction of Castle Ward in the early 1760s, blending elements of both classical and Gothic architectural styles. This design was a reflection of a compromise between the viscount's preference for classical architecture and his wife's affinity for the Gothic style. Additionally, Ward expanded the estate by acquiring adjoining land and transformed it into a more spacious layout, incorporating features like a deer park.

Parliament of Ireland
| Preceded by Arthur Hill; Robert Hawkins Magill | Member of Parliament for County Down; 1745–1770; With: Arthur Hill 1745–1766; Henry Seymour-Conway 1766–1768; Roger Hall 1768–1770 | Succeeded by Roger Hall; Robert Stewart |
| Preceded by Alexander Hamilton; James Stevenson | Member of Parliament for Killyleagh; 1761; With: John Congreve | Succeeded by John Blackwood; John Congreve |
| Preceded by John Parnell; Robert Hamilton | Member of Parliament for Bangor; 1768; With: John Blackwood | Succeeded by Hon. Nicholas Ward; John Blackwood |
Peerage of Ireland
| New creation | Viscount Bangor; January–May 1781 | Succeeded by Nicholas Ward |
| New creation | Baron Bangor; 1770–1781 | Succeeded by Nicholas Ward |
