= David Campbell (Down politician) =

David Campbell was an MP in the Irish Parliament.

Campbell was born in Westminster and educated at Trinity College, Dublin. He was MP for Bangor from 1692 to 1698.
