= Bangor (Parliament of Ireland constituency) =

Pre-1801 Irish constituency

Coordinates: 54.655°N 5.675°W

- Former borough constituency for the Irish House of Commons
- County: County Down
- Borough: Bangor

1613–1801
- Replaced by: Disfranchised

Bangor was a constituency represented in the Irish House of Commons until 1800.

== History ==
In the Patriot Parliament of 1689 summoned by James II, Bangor was not represented.

== Members of Parliament, 1613–1801 ==
Election	First MP	Second MP	
1613	Edward Brabazon	John Dalway	
1634	Malby Brabazon	Arthur Bassett	
1639	John Hamilton	James Hamilton	
1661	William Conyngham	Thomas Boyd (expelled 1665)	
1689	Bangor was not represented in the Patriot Parliament		
1692	Francis Annesley	David Campbell	
1695	Sir James Hamilton	David Campbell	
1698	Sir James Hamilton	Henry Maxwell	Whig
1707	Charles O'Neill	Henry Maxwell	Whig
1713	Capel Moore	Robert Ward	
1715	Michael Ward (Note: Also elected for County Down in 1715, for which he chose to sit)	Hans Hamilton (Note: Also elected for Newry in 1715, for which he chose to sit)	
1716	Edward Riggs	Acheson Moore	
November 1727	Michael Ward	Acheson Moore	
1727	Sir Robert Maude, 1st Bt	Acheson Moore	
1751	Mathew Forde	Acheson Moore	
1761	Robert Ward	Robert Hamilton	
1767	John Parnell	Robert Hamilton	
1768	Bernard Ward (Note: Also elected for County Down in 1768, for which he chose to sit)	John Blackwood (Note: Succeeded as 2nd Baronet in 1774)	
1771	Hon. Nicholas Ward	John Blackwood	
1776	Hon. Pierce Butler (Note: Also elected for Callan in 1776, for which he chose to sit)	Hon. Edward Ward (Note: Also elected for County Down in 1783, for which he chose to sit)	
1778	Edward Hunt	Hon. Edward Ward	
1783	Edward Hunt	Richard Magenis	
1790	Sir John Blackwood, 2nd Bt	Sir John Parnell, 2nd Bt (Note: Also elected for Queen's County in 1790, for which he chose to sit)	
1791	Sir John Blackwood, 2nd Bt	John Keane	
1798	Hon. Robert Ward	John Stewart	
1801	Disenfranchised		

== Bibliography ==
- O'Hart, John (2007). The Irish and Anglo-Irish Landed Gentry: When Cromwell came to Ireland. Vol. II. Heritage Books. ISBN 0-7884-1927-7.
- Leigh Rayment's historical List of Members of the Irish House of Commons. Cites: Johnston-Liik, Edith Mary (2002). The History of the Irish Parliament 1692-1800 (6 volumes). Ulster Historical Foundation.
