= Francis Savage =

Irish politician

Francis Savage (1769 – 19 September 1823) was an Irish politician. He was the eldest son of Charles Savage of Ardkeen and educated at Trinity College Dublin.

He was appointed Sheriff of County Down for 1791-92 and 1819–20. He was elected member of parliament for County Down in the Parliament of Ireland, 1794–1800 and for County Down in the United Kingdom Parliament, 1801–1812.

Parliament of Ireland
Preceded by Earl of Hillsborough; Hon. Robert Stewart	Member of Parliament for County Down; 1794–1801; With: Hon. Robert Stewart, later Viscount Castlereagh	Succeeded by Parliament of the United Kingdom
Parliament of the United Kingdom
New constituency	Member of Parliament for Down; 1801–1812; With: Robert Stewart, Viscount Castlereagh 1801–1805; Hon. John Meade 1805–1812	Succeeded by Hon. John Meade; Hon. Robert Ward
