= Hampton Villa =

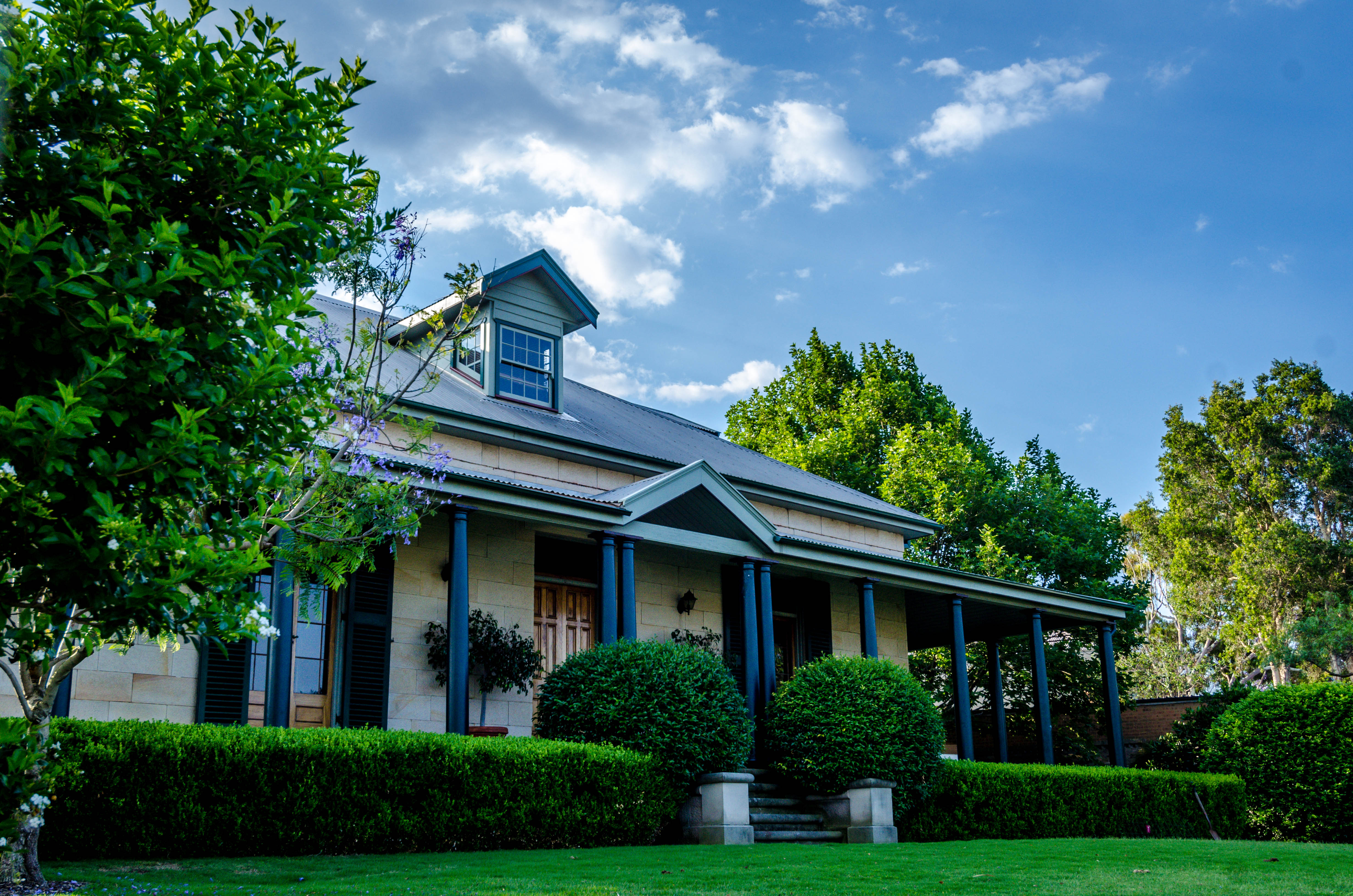

- Location within Sydney Location within Australia
- 33.8600°S 151.1889°E
- Location: 12b Grafton Street, Balmain, Inner West Council, Sydney, New South Wales, Australia

History
- Built: 1847–1849

Site notes
- Architect: John Verge (attributed)

New South Wales Heritage Register
- Official name: Hampton Villa; Hampton Cottage
- Type: state heritage (built)
- Designated: 27 May 2005
- Reference no.: 1725
- Type: Villa
- Category: Residential buildings (private)
- Builders: Edward Hunt

Hampton Villa is a heritage-listed residence at 12b Grafton Street, Balmain, New South Wales, a suburb of Sydney, Australia. It was built c. 1847-1849 by Edward Hunt; the design is uncertain, but has been attributed to John Verge. Among its notable residents was Henry Parkes, tenant from 1888 to 1892. The villa replaced an earlier building known as Hampton Cottage. It was added to the New South Wales State Heritage Register on 27 May 2005.

== History ==
Hampton Villa was built between 1847 and 1849 by the prominent Sydney cabinet maker, Edward Hunt. Hunt had arrived in Sydney with his brother Charles in 1814 and quickly rose to prominence within the community. In 1820 he was a member of the committee of the Sydney Bible Association, a subscriber to the Benevolent Society from 1821, contributed to the building of the Scots Church in Sydney and in 1827 was appointed to the Wesleyan Auxiliary Missionary Society. In 1842 he was elected as one of the first aldermen of the City of Sydney. In 1858 was elected to the New South Wales Legislative Council.

Edward Hunt possibly occupied the property of Hampton Villa from as early as 1840 at the peak of his business success, influence and affluence. At this time, a small weatherboard cottage with associated outbuildings and stables, known as Hampton Cottage, existed on the site, which may have been built by Hunt. Ownership of the property changed in quick succession during the early 1800s between real estate speculators before it was purchased by Hunt in 1847. In 1801 the 1800 land grant to William Balmain was transferred to John Gilchrist, to discharge Balmain's debts to Gilchrist. Gilchrist sold the original land grant in six parcels, including three lots to Thomas Hynde in 1837. Ownership was transferred in 1840 to John Terry Hughes who headed a consortium of speculators, and was again transferred in 1841 to Adolphus William Young when Hughes defaulted on his loan from Young. In 1847 Hunt purchased Lots 1-3 and 5 of Young's subdivision. The land title deeds were held by Young until the purchase price of 1,100 pounds (plus additional interest etc.) was repaid by Hunt to Young in 1851. Hunt appears to have been the first owner of the property to repay the loan for its purchase or other loans on the property and to therefore retain its ownership. Edward Hunt and his widow owned and occupied Hampton Villa for 35 years, and the Hunt family owned the property for nearly 50 years.

Edward Hunt is believed to have built Hampton Villa in c. 1847-1849, a sandstone gentleman's residence with attic. The design of the villa has been attributed to the prominent Sydney architect, John Verge, although not conclusively established. John Verge practiced from 1831-1838, with some of his commissions completed after 1838 by his assistant, John Bibb. Verge became the most sought-after domestic architect from this period, who designed gentleman's residences for the elite of Sydney society. Edward Hunt, a leading cabinet maker, and John Verge, the leading architect of the time, are known to have had several clients in common amongst the elite of Sydney who could afford to commission their work. A further connection between Hunt and Verge is that Hunt hired Verge to build his Jamieson Street showroom and house in 1833. The success and influence of Edward Hunt during this period also makes it probable that he would commission the leading and most sought-after architect of the time to build his home. In addition to the connections between Verge and Hunt, the physical fabric of Hampton Villa supports that the building was designed by John Verge because it combines many of the characteristics that are known to be typical of works by Verge. These include the use of sandstone quoining and very fine ashlar construction, the stone-flagged verandah, the depth of the verandah, the hipped roof, the generous proportions of rooms, the exceptionally high ceilings for the period (14 feet), the exceptionally fine cedar joinery that is a dominant feature of the interiors, the use of French doors with slender glazing bars and louvred shutters, the non-glazed kick-panels in the French doors (a Verge trademark), the elevated situation of building with a commanding hill top view, and the careful situation of the building within a planned and ordered landscape. Moreover, the overall quality and combination of these elements is indicative of a highly skilled architect, of whom there were few in the subject period, and no others known with the reputation of Verge.

Both the c. 1847 sandstone Hampton Villa and the c. 1840 timber Hampton Cottage remained on the allotment for some time. Between 1851 and 1856, Hunt purchased a number of the surrounding lots accumulating approximately 3.5 acres (1.4 ha) occupying all the land between Adolphus Street and Camerons Cove.

Hunt died in the house in December 1866, after which his widow Hannah continued to live there until 1872. In 1872 Hampton Villa was leased to businessman, etcher and gallery director Eliezer Levi Montefiori. Montefiori had relocated from Victoria, where he had helped found the Victorian Academy of Art and was a trustee of the Melbourne Public Library, Museums and National Gallery. In Sydney he joined with Thomas Sutcliffe Mort and others to found the NSW Academy of Art. Between 1871 and 1891 he was a director of the Pacific Fire and Insurance Co, and was one of the original founders of the National Art Gallery of New South Wales which opened in September 1880.

In 1878 the extension of Ewenton Street to Grafton Street effectively split the property in two, leaving the house on the eastern portion of land. This represented the first of a number of future subdivisions of the property.

In 1888, Sir Henry Parkes, Premier of New South Wales, moved in to Hampton Villa as a tenant. Parkes' residency at Hampton Villa coincided with a most tumultuous time in his political career and personal life. Parkes' first wife of 50 years, Clarinda, had died immediately prior to his move to Hampton Villa. In February 1889 he married his long-time mistress Eleanor Dixon, by whom he had three children. In May 1890 Parkes was thrown from a carriage in the city and broke his leg in two places, confining him to the house for two and half months and intermittently for the remainder of the year. During this time debates over the Constitutional Convention for Federation were taking place in the Parliament of New South Wales. Parkes kept in constant contact with the Parliament, with at least one cabinet meeting held at Hampton Villa during the year and ongoing official correspondence and government business being carried out from Parkes' study at the house. Parkes remained at Hampton Villa until 1892 when pressing financial problems forced Parkes to relocate to North Annandale.

In 1893 the Hunt family subdivided the Hampton Villa estate and lots were sold by the Savings Bank of NSW. Hampton Cottage was demolished at this time. Hampton Villa was purchased by Frances Perry in 1897 and the Perry family lived there for 15 years. In 1912 the house was purchased by Frank Bourne Wilson, who retained the property until 1943 when it was passed to his son, who in turn sold it in 1947. Frank Wilson operated a knitting business from Hampton Villa, first from the old stone kitchen, and later from a small brick factory building constructed in the rear yard on the site of the former stables. The factory employed 52 female workers producing ladies knitwear. Initially trading as the Knitting Co, it was later renamed Wilson Baker knitting Co when control passed to Frank's brother Harold in partnership with others. As a family business the company prospered until a fire destroyed the factory in 1925. The company continued to trade on a reduced basis from Hampton Villa, as HS Wilson and Co, until being wound up around 1932.

In April 1943 Frank Wilson gave the house to his son John Hector who sold it in May 1947. To this time the house had had only three owners in 100 years.

Following Wilson's ownership, Hampton Villa was converted to flats until restoration in the later 1970s returned it to a private house, which it remains to this day.

== Description ==
=== Villa ===
Hampton Villa is an early Victorian house, two storied, surrounded on three sides by a wide sandstone verandah. The main entrance door is a double six panelled door flanked by two pairs of shuttered French doors with panelling and margin bars. There are a further two pairs of French doors on each side verandah. The verandah ceiling is lined with painted timber boards and supported by regularly placed concrete columns.

There is an attic storey above, with seven dormer windows, two each to the north, south and west and one to the east. The roof is of corrugated iron, replacing an earlier terracotta tile roof, which itself had replaced the original roof.

The ground floor interior consists of four main rooms paired either side of a wide central corridor, which is divided by internal double doors. Each room is approximately 6 metres X 6 metres with high 4 metre ceilings. The rooms all have original fireplaces, cedar skirting boards and six panelled cedar doors. Likewise internal staircases are also of cedar.

To the rear are pantry, laundry and bathroom to one side and kitchen, a second bathroom and dressing room to the other. These are contained within two additional wings constructed in 1988.

The first floor is made up of five bedrooms and a sitting room plus bathroom.

The site has some archaeological potential in terms of the former detached kitchen, stables and outbuildings, as well as potential remains of the cottage that predated Hampton Villa, close to the northern property boundary. Remains of the early twentieth century Knitting Factory may also be present.

=== Garden ===
A masonry fence defines the boundary. The villa is fronted with a sloping lawn. On its Grafton Street side a grove of Cocos Island (or Queen) palms, Syragus romannzoffianum flanks the house. The villa is located on the crest of a hill with commanding views over Sydney Harbour to the city.

=== Modifications and dates ===
- 1840+: Hampton Cottage was on this site
- 1847-9: villa is built.
- 1851-56: Hunt purchased a number of the surrounding lots accumulating approximately 3.5 acres (1.4 ha) occupying all the land between Adolphus Street and Camerons Cove.
- 1878: the extension of Ewenton Street to Grafton Street effectively split the property in two lots, leaving the house on the eastern portion of land. This represented the first of a number of future subdivisions of the property and produced the current site boundary by 1957.
- 1915: stables demolished and replaced by factory building. Factory removed following a fire in 1925.
- c. 1947: Hampton Villa converted to two flats, with new bathroom created downstairs. Verandah roof replaced c. 1950.
- c. 1960: roof replaced with terracotta tiles.
- 1973/74: Hampton Villa restored to a single family home by then owner David Ashton. Work at this time included the removal of fibro infill on the verandah, removal of the roof tiles and replacement with corrugated iron, removal of paint from external sandstone walls and internal cedar woodwork. North and south dormer windows were added at this stage.
- 1988: two new wings added extending the bathroom and kitchen/family areas. Extensive work carried out in the garden as well. The verandah was re-laid with sandstone, replacing the original flag stones. Timber posts were replaced by concrete columns, the ceiling was lined and a triangular pediment was created over the entrance. Internally a new doorway was created between the lounge room and bedroom 1. Chimneys were replaced, rear staircase was rebuilt and an underground garage and storage area built beneath the front lawn.

== Heritage listing ==
Constructed in 1847, Hampton Villa is a fine and rare surviving example of an early Victorian marine villa designed in the Georgian style situated on the waterfront of Sydney Harbour.

Hampton Villa is associated with a number of prominent colonial personalities, most notably Sir Henry Parkes, who lived at Hampton Villa between 1888 and 1892 during his term as Premier of NSW; Edward Hunt, who built the house and was a councillor on the first Sydney Council and member of the Legislative Assembly; and Eliezer Montefiori a founder of the Art Gallery of NSW.

Through its connection to Sir Henry Parkes, Hampton Villa is associated with the move towards Australian Federation, as it was the venue for at least one NSW Cabinet meeting and various government business during the 1890 constitutional debates.

The house retains its visual relationship with the harbour and Sydney City and is a prominent landmark feature on the Balmain peninsula. The grandeur, quality and situation of the house provide evidence of the standing of the house's occupants and demonstrate the careful positioning of the villa in its original setting.

The subdivision of the Hampton Villa estate is still visible in the surrounding street pattern and provides a good example of the 19th century encroachment of suburban development on early Sydney estates.

Hampton Villa was listed on the New South Wales State Heritage Register on 27 May 2005 having satisfied the following criteria.

The place is important in demonstrating the course, or pattern, of cultural or natural history in New South Wales.

Hampton Villa has historical significance as one of the few remaining gentlemen's marine villas, from the early Victorian Period, on the Balmain peninsula. It displays the late nineteenth century subdivision pattern of Balmains' waterfront and demonstrates the encroachment of suburbia on colonial landscapes in Sydney.

The place has a strong or special association with a person, or group of persons, of importance of cultural or natural history of New South Wales's history.

Hampton Villa has strong historical associative significance as the home of Sir Henry Parkes, NSW Premier, and his family from 1888 to 1892. During this period Parkes was confined to Hampton Villa through injury and administered his office as Premier from the house. Parkes was a leading political figure in both NSW and national politics, being a prominent personality in the Federation movement. Parkes formulated parts of his Federation debate from the house and held at least one Cabinet meeting at Hampton Villa, during the time of the Constitutional debates in 1890. Hampton Villa was built by Edward Hunt, a councillor on Sydney's first city council and member of the Legislative Council. After Hunt, Elezier Montefiori, a founder of the National Art Gallery of NSW, also lived in Hampton Villa.

The place is important in demonstrating aesthetic characteristics and/or a high degree of creative or technical achievement in New South Wales.

Hampton Villa has aesthetic significance as a well detailed gentlemen's marine villa of the early Victorian period in the Georgian mode. The building is of high quality construction and presents a strong visual and waterscape element. The building gives an insight into the construction and layout of an early Victorian house, while the surrounds and yard retain elements of its former setting. The house retains views from Sydney city and the Anzac Bridge, recalling its prominent setting overlooking the harbour.

The place has strong or special association with a particular community or cultural group in New South Wales for social, cultural or spiritual reasons.

Hampton Villa has social significance for its role in the lead up to the Federation of Australia as the home and office of Sir Henry Parkes. The subdivision of the estate in 1893 set the pattern of streets and waterfront allotments which are characteristic for this area of the Balmain peninsula. The site is also significant for the operation of the Knitting Co, which employed 52 local women in the early years of the twentieth century, making it one of the main employers of women in the Balmain area at this time.

The place has potential to yield information that will contribute to an understanding of the cultural or natural history of New South Wales.

Hampton Villa has technical and research potential as a relatively intact example of an early Victorian marine villa. Archaeological evidence of its stables, detached kitchen and associated outbuildings may also exist within the allotment.

The place possesses uncommon, rare or endangered aspects of the cultural or natural history of New South Wales.

Hampton Villa remains as a rare surviving example of an early Victorian marine villa on the Balmain peninsula. Throughout Sydney villas of this type are becoming increasingly rare. Its prominent position, and maintained views to the water are equally rare as modern harbourside development overshadows earlier surviving colonial structures.

The place is important in demonstrating the principal characteristics of a class of cultural or natural places/environments in New South Wales.

Hampton Villa is a good representative example of an early Victorian gentleman's marine villa.
