= Edward Ward (politician) =

Irish politician

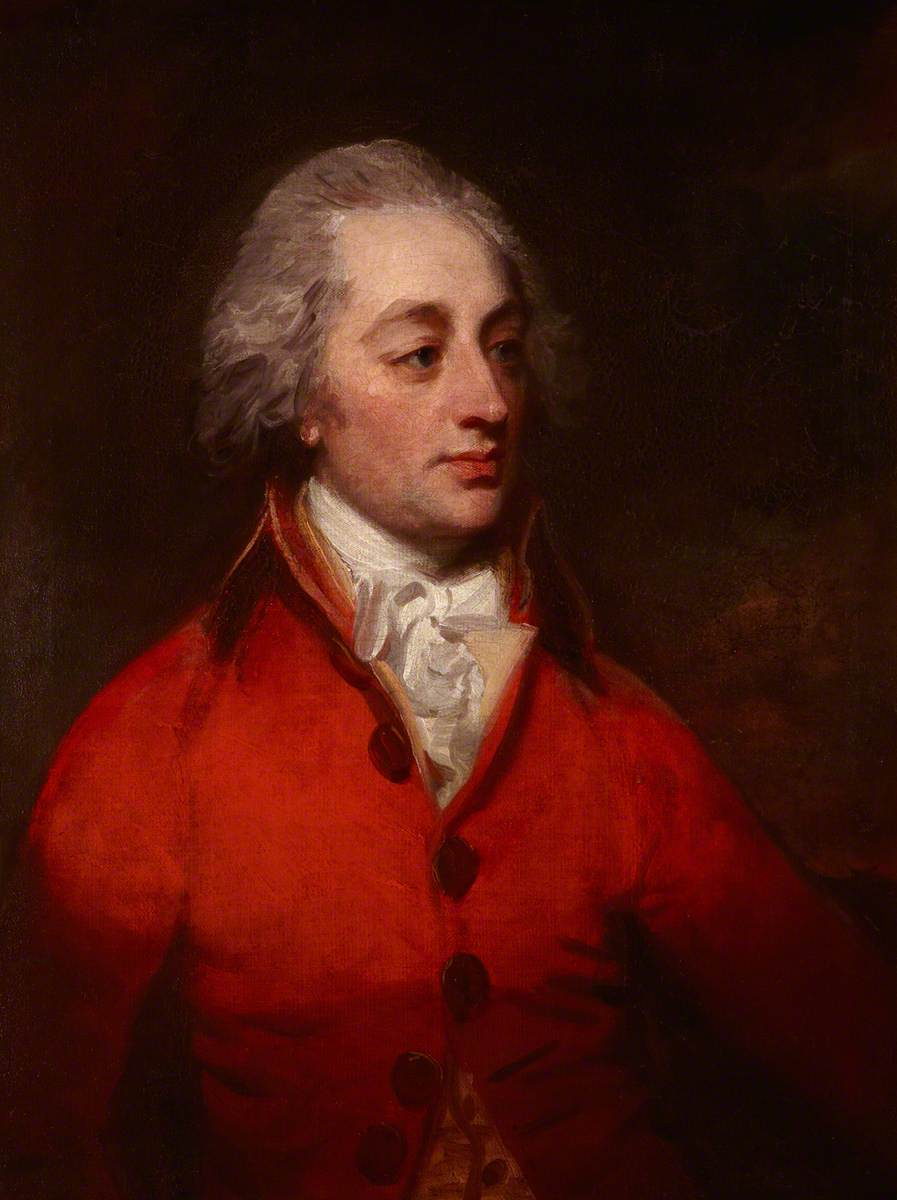

Edward Ward (30 April 1753 – November 1812), styled The Honourable from 1770, was an Irish politician.

He was the third son of Bernard Ward, 1st Viscount Bangor and his wife Lady Ann Bligh, daughter of John Bligh, 1st Earl of Darnley and his wife Theodosia Bligh, 10th Baroness Clifton. His brothers were Nicholas Ward, 2nd Viscount Bangor and Robert Ward. In 1785, he and his uncle Sir John Parnell, 2nd Baronet petitioned the Irish House of Lords successfully to place Nicholas under disability.

Ward entered the Irish House of Commons in 1776, sitting for Bangor, the same constituency his father and his older brother had also represented, until 1776. Subsequently, he was returned for County Down until 1790.

On 15 February 1783, he married his maternal cousin Lady Arabella Crosbie, youngest daughter of William Crosbie, 1st Earl of Glandore and had by her six daughters and five sons. Ward died at the family's residence Castle Ward in 1812. His third and oldest surviving son Edward succeeded as Viscount Bangor in 1827.

Parliament of Ireland
| Preceded by Hon. Nicholas Ward; Sir John Blackwood, 2nd Bt | Member of Parliament for Bangor; 1776–1783; With: Hon. Pierce Butler 1776–1778; Edward Hunt 1778–1783 | Succeeded by Edward Hunt; Richard Magenis |
| Preceded by Viscount Kilwarlin; Robert Stewart | Member of Parliament for County Down; 1783–1790; With: Viscount Kilwarlin | Succeeded by Viscount Kilwarlin; Hon. Robert Stewart |
