= Sir John Blackwood, 2nd Baronet =

Irish politician and baronet

Sir John Blackwood, 2nd Baronet (1721 – 27 February 1799) was an Irish politician and baronet.

He was the eldest son of Sir Robert Blackwood, 1st Baronet of Ballyleidy Blackwood entered the Irish House of Commons for Killyleagh in 1761 and sat for it until 1768. He was then returned for Bangor until 1776. He was member of parliament for Killyleagh again until 1790 and subsequently for Bangor until 1798. From the latter year to his death in 1799, he represented Killyleagh a third time.

He married Dorcas Stevenson (afterwards Dorcas Blackwood, Baroness Dufferin and Claneboye), eldest daughter and co-heir of James Stevenson, of Killyleagh, County Down (by his wife Ann, daughter of General Nicholas Price), son of Hans Stevenson by his wife Anne, daughter and eventually sole heiress of James Hamilton, of Neilsbrook, County Antrim, the nephew and sole heir of James Hamilton, 1st Viscount Claneboye, father of James Hamilton, 1st Earl of Clanbrassil. They had 11 children:

- Robert Blackwood (1752–1786), MP for Killyleagh, died unmarried after he was killed falling off a horse.
- James Stevenson Blackwood, 2nd Baron Dufferin and Claneboye (1755–1836).
- Rev. John Blackwood (9 October 1757 – 5 January 1833), who married firstly in 1778 Sophia (who died in 1803), daughter of Hill Benson, Archdeacon of Down, and married secondly in 1803 Eliza, eldest daughter of Josias Dupré, of Wilton Park, Buckinghamshire and died without issue.
- Hans Blackwood, 3rd Baron Dufferin and Claneboye (1758–1839).
- Price Blackwood (24 January 1760 – 1816), who married firstly in 1787 Louisa (who died on 20 September 1802), second daughter and co-heir of William Southwell, and married secondly in 1804 Anne, second daughter of Richard Cox, of Castletown Cox, County Kilkenny, only son of Michael Cox, Archbishop of Cashel and died without issue.
- Leeson Blackwood (1766–1804).
- Sir Henry Blackwood, 1st Baronet, of the Navy (1770–1832).
- Four daughters Anne, Sophia, Dorcas and Catharine. Anne married firstly John Ryder (Dean of Lismore) and secondly Reverend James Jones (died 1825), a Church of Ireland clergyman in Urney, County Tyrone, and son of Theophilus Jones Mp (1729–1811).

Parliament of Ireland
Preceded by Bernard Ward; John Congreve	Member of Parliament for Killyleagh; 1761–1768; With: John Congreve	Succeeded by Viscount Ikerrin; Sir Archibald Acheson, 6th Bt
Preceded by John Parnell; Robert Hamilton	Member of Parliament for Bangor; 1768–1776; With: Bernard Ward 1768–1771; Hon. Nicholas Ward 1771–1776	Succeeded by Hon. Pierce Butler; Hon. Edward Ward
Preceded by Arthur Johnston; Hon. Pierce Butler	Member of Parliament for Killyleagh; 1776–1790; With: Robert Blackwood 1776–1788; James Stevenson Blackwood 1788–1790	Succeeded by Hon. Robert Ward; James Stevenson Blackwood
Preceded by Edward Hunt; Richard Magenis	Member of Parliament for Bangor; 1790–1798; With: Sir John Parnell, 2nd Bt 1790–1798; John Keane 1791–1798	Succeeded by Hon. Robert Ward; John Stewart
Preceded by Hon. Robert Ward; James Stevenson Blackwood	Member of Parliament for Killyleagh; 1798–1799; With: James Stevenson Blackwood	Succeeded by Hans Blackwood; Sir James Blackwood, 3rd Bt
Baronetage of Ireland
Preceded by Robert Blackwood	Baronet (of Killyleagh); 1774–1799	Succeeded by James Blackwood
