= Hillsborough (Parliament of Ireland constituency) =

Pre-1801 Irish constituency

Coordinates: 54.4643°N 6.076°W

- Former borough constituency for the Irish House of Commons
- County: County Down
- Borough: Hillsborough

1662–1801
- Seats: 2
- Replaced by: Disfranchised

Hillsborough was a constituency represented in the Irish House of Commons until 1800.

== History ==
In the Patriot Parliament of 1689 summoned by James II, Hillsborough was not represented.

== Members of Parliament, 1662–1801 ==
- 1662–1666 Sir Robert Colville and Carrol Bolton

=== 1689–1801 ===
Election	First MP	Second MP
1689	Hillsborough was not represented in the Patriot Parliament	
1692	Sir John Magill	William Shaw
1695	Michael Hill	William Shaw
1703	Thomas Keightley (Note: Also elected for County Kildare in 1703, for which he chose to sit.)	Samuel Waring
1703	William Richardson	Samuel Waring
1713	Trevor Hill	Samuel Waring
1715	Arthur Hill	Samuel Waring
1727	Thomas Carter	Francis Stoyte
1733	Thomas Carter	William Cooper (Note: Created a baronet in 1758)
1761	Arthur Trevor	William Montgomery
1771	Charles Powell Leslie I	William Montgomery
1776	Charles Dunbar (Note: Also elected for Blessington in 1776, for which he chose to sit)	William Montgomery
1777	James Bailie	William Montgomery
1788	Robert Johnson	William Montgomery
January 1800	Robert Johnson	Chichester Fortescue
February 1800	William Edmond Reilly	Chichester Fortescue
1801	Disenfranchised	

== Bibliography ==
- O'Hart, John (2007). The Irish and Anglo-Irish Landed Gentry: When Cromwell came to Ireland. Vol. II. Heritage Books. ISBN 0-7884-1927-7.
- Leigh Rayment's historical List of Members of the Irish House of Commons. Cites: Johnston-Liik, Edith Mary (2002). The History of the Irish Parliament 1692-1800 (6 volumes). Ulster Historical Foundation.
