= Sir John Magill, 1st Baronet =

Sir John Magill, 1st Baronet (ante 1639 – 18 January 1700) was an Anglo-Irish politician.

Magill was given the name John Johnston at birth, the son of William Johnston and Susanna Magill. He changed his surname to Magill in 1677.

On 5 November 1680 he was made a knight bachelor by James Butler, 1st Duke of Ormond. On 10 November 1680 he was created a baronet, of Gill Hall in the Baronetage of Ireland. Between 1692 and 1693 Magill was the Member of Parliament for Hillsborough in the Irish House of Commons. He then represented Downpatrick from 1695 to 1699.

He married, firstly, Elizabeth Mary Hawkins on 13 October 1677. He married, secondly, Hon. Arabella Susanna Hamilton, daughter of Hugh Hamilton, 1st Viscount of Glenawly. Magill had no sons by either marriage and his title became extinct upon his death.

Parliament of Ireland
Preceded by Not represented in the Patriot Parliament	Member of Parliament for Hillsborough; 1692–1693; With: William Shaw	Succeeded by Michael Hill; William Shaw
Preceded by James Hamilton; Nicholas Price	Member of Parliament for Downpatrick; 1695–1699; With: Francis Annesley	Succeeded by Mathew Forde; Francis Annesley
Baronetage of Ireland
New creation	Baronet (of Gill Hall); 1680–1700	Extinct
