= Narcissus Luttrell =

English historian, diarist, bibliographer and Member of Parliament

Narcissus Luttrell (1657–1732) was an English historian, diarist and bibliographer, and briefly Member of Parliament for two different Cornish boroughs. His Brief Historical Relation of State Affairs from September 1678 to April 1714, a chronicle of the Parliaments of England and Great Britain, was distilled from his diary and published in 1857, after Macaulay had drawn attention to the manuscript in All Souls College, Oxford.

== Writing career ==
Although Luttrell was for most of his life a private citizen and relied primarily on secondary sources for the workings of Parliament, he is often the best source available for legal and political matters of the time. The legislation itself is covered by the official parliamentary journals, but Luttrell's diary is often the only record of debates within the Palace of Westminster. As a result, Luttrell provides crucial political information which cannot be found elsewhere; as one example out of many, he notes that the debate on taxation of 1691 was divided according to geography, with Norfolk and Suffolk arguing against the remainder of the country over methods of taxation. Since individual members' votes were not recorded, the political significance of the legislation would be less clear without Luttrell's record.

Luttrell's diary also covers major events in diplomacy, literature and the arts, as well as parliamentary proceedings, and is supplemented in those areas by annotations within his massive library. He also compiled a bibliography of texts relating to the Popish Plot, The Compleat Catalogue of Stitch’d Books and Single Sheets, &c. Luttrell had one of the most impressive book collections of his time, and it was his wish that the library would be preserved intact, perhaps in an institution such as Gray's Inn (where he was called to the bar in 1680). After the death in 1749 of Luttrell's only surviving son, Francis, the library passed to Luttrell's sister, Dorothy Wynne. Her grandson, Luttrell Wynne, a fellow of All Souls College Oxford, gave Luttrell's MSS to the Codrington Library at All Souls College, but other material was dispersed through sales.

On 21 January 1694 the future Anne, Queen of Great Britain lost another child to stillbirth. Although she had a surviving son in the person of Prince William, Duke of Gloucester, she had suffered two stillbirths, three miscarriages, and lost 4 babies within hours, minutes, months, or years after they were born. Some sources say this child was a girl, who was 6 months gestation. Luttrell wrote that Anne “miscarried of a dead child.” He did not specify a gender. Anne would fall pregnant 6 more times, but they would end in miscarriage or stillbirth. Her son William died in 1700 at the age of 11 from an unknown illness.

== Scattered remnants of his collection ==
While many pieces from Luttrell's collection were eventually acquired by the British Library, many were not. Material purchased by Professor James Osborn from two sales at Sotheby's (in 1936 and 1957) was later given to Beinecke Library at Yale University. Various portions of the collection are now housed in several libraries in Britain and the United States, notably the British Library, Beinecke Library, Newberry Library and Huntington Library. The whereabouts of other material remains unknown.

== Major published works ==
- A Brief Historical Relation of State Affairs: from September 1678 to April 1714 (reprint of the 6 volume University Press, Oxford, 1857 ed.). Wilmington, DE: Scholarly Resources. 1974. ISBN 978-0842014236. OCLC 1675354. Volumes at Internet Archive:
- Volume 1: September 1678 to December 1689.
- Volume 2: January 1690 to January 1693.
- Volume 3: January 1693 to December 1696.
- Volume 4: January 1696 to December 1700.
- Volume 5: January 1701 to December 1705.
- Volume 6: January 1706 to April 1714.
- Index to all volumes.
- The Compleat Catalogue of Stitch’d Books and Single Sheets, &c. Printed Since the First Discovery of the Popish Plot (London, 1680).
- The Parliamentary Diary of Narcissus Luttrell, 1691–1693; ed. Henry Horwitz (Oxford: Clarendon Press, 1972, ISBN 0-19-822367-6).
- Narcissus Luttrell's Popish Plot Catalogues (Oxford: Blackwell for the Luttrell Society, 1956).

Parliament of England
Preceded by William Coryton; John Tregagle	Member of Parliament for Bossiney; 1679–1681; With: Charles Robartes	Succeeded by Charles Robartes; Sir Peter Colleton, Bt
Preceded by Sir John Carew; Richard Carew	Member of Parliament for Saltash; 1691–1695; With: Sir John Carew 1691–1692; Michael Hill 1692–1695	Succeeded by Francis Buller; Walter Moyle
