= Downpatrick (Parliament of Ireland constituency) =

Pre-1801 Irish constituency

Coordinates: 54.324°N 5.703°W

- Former borough constituency for the Irish House of Commons
- County: County Down
- Borough: Downpatrick

1586–1801
- Seats: 2
- Replaced by: Downpatrick (UKHC)

Downpatrick was a constituency represented in the Irish House of Commons until 1801.

== History ==
In the Patriot Parliament of 1689 summoned by James II, Downpatrick was not represented.

== Members of Parliament, 1586–1801 ==
- 1613-1615: Richard Wingfield, 1st Viscount Powerscourt and Richard West
- 1634–1635: Edward Kynaston (died 1634) and William Billingsly
- 1639–1649: Mark Trevor and William Billingsly
- 1661–1666: Nicholas Ward and Daniel O'Neill

=== 1689–1801 ===
Election	First member	First party	Second member	Second party
1689	Downpatrick was not represented in the Patriot Parliament			
1692	James Hamilton		Nicholas Price	
1695	Sir John Magill, 1st Bt		Francis Annesley (Note: Expelled in 1703)	
1703	Mathew Forde		Francis Annesley	
1705	Mathew Forde		Isaac Manley	
1713	Mathew Forde		Francis Annesley	
1715	Sir Emanuel Moore, 3rd Bt		Thomas Medlycott	
1727	Edward Southwell		Cromwell Price	
1755	Bowen Southwell		Cromwell Price	
1761	Mathew Forde		Hon. Francis Charles Annesley	
1771	Mathew Forde		Clotworthy Rowley	
1776	Hon. Robert Henry Southwell		Clotworthy Rowley	
1783	Hon. Hercules Rowley (Note: Also elected for County Antrim in 1783, for which he chose to sit.)		Clotworthy Rowley	
October 1783	Andrew Caldwell		Clotworthy Rowley	
1790	Jonathan Chetwood		Clotworthy Rowley	
1798	Josias Rowley		Clotworthy Rowley	
1801	Succeeded by the Westminster constituency Downpatrick			

== Bibliography ==
- O'Hart, John (2007). The Irish and Anglo-Irish Landed Gentry: When Cromwell came to Ireland. Vol. II. Heritage Books. ISBN 0-7884-1927-7.
- Leigh Rayment's historical List of Members of the Irish House of Commons. Cites: Johnston-Liik, Edith Mary (2002). The History of the Irish Parliament 1692-1800 (6 volumes). Ulster Historical Foundation.
