= Michael Hill (1672–1699) =

English politician

Michael Hill (7 August 1672 – 1699) was a politician in England and Ireland.

== Biography ==
He was the son of William Hill, of Hillsborough by his wife Eleanor, daughter of Archbishop Michael Boyle.

Michael Hill was Member of Parliament for Saltash in the English House of Commons from 1692 to 1695, and for Hillsborough in the Irish House of Commons from 1695 to 1699. He also served as Governor and Custos Rotulorum of County Down and appointed to the Privy Council of Ireland in 1694.

== Family ==
In 1690, he married Anne, daughter of Sir John Trevor; they had two sons and one daughter. His eldest son and heir Trevor was made Viscount Hillsborough. Through his second son, Arthur Hill-Trevor, 1st Viscount Dungannon, he is the great-grandfather of Arthur Wellesley, 1st Duke of Wellington.

== Notes ==
Parliament of England
Preceded by Sir John Carew; Narcissus Luttrell	Member of Parliament for Saltash; 1692–1695; With: Narcissus Luttrell	Succeeded by Francis Buller; Walter Moyle
Parliament of Ireland
Preceded by Sir John Magill; William Shaw	Member of Parliament for Hillsborough; 1695–1699; With: William Shaw	Succeeded by Thomas Keightley; Samuel Waring
