= Castleward Opera =

Northern Ireland opera company

Castleward Opera was a Northern Ireland opera company which staged an annual opera festival at Castle Ward, a National Trust house near Strangford in County Down. It was founded in 1985 by Ian Urwin and Jack Smith, with performances taking place in a converted stable on the grounds of the castle. Following the cut to its core funding by the Arts Council of Northern Ireland, the festival saw its final opera performances in June 2009 and in September 2010 held two gala farewell concerts of highlights from the company's 25-year history. In January 2010, a new venture, supported by the Arts Council of Northern Ireland, was proposed—Opera Company NI—which the Arts Council said would "incorporate the best resources from Castleward Opera and Opera Fringe".

== Past productions ==
- 1985 – Così fan tutte
- 1986 – Don Giovanni and The Impresario
- 1987 – The Magic Flute and Dido and Aeneas
- 1988 – L'elisir d'amore and Trial by Jury
- 1989 – Pagliacci and Gianni Schicchi
- 1990 – Don Pasquale and Opera Scenes
- 1991 – Così fan tutte and Opera Scenes
- 1992 – La traviata and Gems from the Irish Ring
- 1993 – Lucia di Lammermoor and La belle Hélène
- 1994 – La Cenerentola and Orpheus in the Underworld
- 1995 – I Capuleti e i Montecchi and L'étoile
- 1996 – Ariadne auf Naxos and La bohème
- 1997 – Carmen and La bohème (revived for the Grand Opera House, Belfast)
- 1998 – La traviata and Carmen (revived for the Grand Opera House, Belfast)
- 1999 – The Barber of Seville, La Sonnambula, and La traviata (revived for the Grand Opera House, Belfast)
- 2000 – Madame Butterfly, Martha, and The Barber of Seville (revived for the Grand Opera House, Belfast)
- 2001 – The Marriage of Figaro, Madame Butterfly, and Martha (revived for the Grand Opera House, Belfast)
- 2002 – Lucia di Lammermoor, La belle Hélène, and The Marriage of Figaro (revived for the Millennium Forum, Londonderry)
- 2003 – La rondine and Tosca
- 2004 – Albert Herring and Rigoletto
- 2005 – The Magic Flute and Carmen
- 2006 – La bohème and The Bohemian Girl
- 2007 – Un ballo in maschera
- 2008 – Così fan tutte
- 2009 – Die Fledermaus (also performed at Wexford Festival Opera)

== See also ==
- List of opera festivals
- Country house opera
- Country House Theatres

== Sources ==
- Arts Council of Northern Ireland, "New opera company for Northern Ireland", 26 January 2010
- Couling, Della, "Castleward Opera, Northern Ireland", The Independent, 14 June 1995
- Dervan, Michael, "North stages opera revamp", Irish Times, 8 February 2010
- Spackman, Conor, "The fat lady sings for Castle Ward opera", BBC News, 6 September 2010
