= Nicholas Ward (Irish politician) =

Irish politician

Nicholas Ward (born 1630) was an Irish politician.

== Early life ==
Ward was the oldest son of Bernard Ward and his wife Anne, daughter of Richard West.

== Career ==
In 1661, Ward entered the Irish House of Commons, sitting for Downpatrick until 1666.

== Personal life ==
Ward married Sarah Buckworth, daughter of Theophilius Buckworth, and had by her two daughters and five sons. His grandson was Michael Ward.
