= Arthur Trevor (cricketer) =

English cricketer

Arthur Hill Trevor (14 November 1858 – 27 September 1924) was an English cricketer active from 1878 to 1885 who played for Sussex. He appeared in 31 first-class matches as a righthanded batsman who bowled slow underarm. He scored 1,064 runs with a highest score of 103 and took one wicket with a best performance of one for 5.

Trevor was born in Calcutta, a son of Charles Binny Trevor of the Indian Civil Service. He was educated at Winchester College and Corpus Christi College, Oxford. He was called to the bar at the Inner Temple in 1884. He was a Commissioner in Lunacy 1907–14 and a Commissioner on the India Board from 1914. He died in Elvanfoot, Lanarkshire.
