= Nicholas Ward, 2nd Viscount Bangor =

Irish politician and peer

Nicholas Ward, 2nd Viscount Bangor (5 December 1750 – 11 September 1827), styled The Honourable from 1770 until 1781, was an Irish politician and peer.

He was the eldest son of Bernard Ward, 1st Viscount Bangor and his wife Lady Ann Bligh, daughter of John Bligh, 1st Earl of Darnley and his wife Theodosia Bligh, 10th Baroness Clifton. His younger brothers were Edward Ward and Robert Ward. He was educated at Christ Church, Oxford, where he matriculated in 1769.

Ward entered the Irish House of Commons in 1771, sitting for Bangor until 1776. He succeeded his father as viscount in 1781 and was considered a lunatic from 1785, having been placed under disability by a bill of the Irish House of Lords on petition of his brother Edward and his cousin Sir John Parnell, 2nd Baronet. Ward died, aged 76, at his residence Castle Ward, unmarried and succeeded in the viscountcy by his nephew Edward.

Parliament of Ireland
Preceded by Bernard Ward; John Blackwood	Member of Parliament for Bangor; 1771–1776; With: John Blackwood	Succeeded by Hon. Pierce Butler; Hon. Edward Ward
Peerage of Ireland
Preceded by Bernard Ward	Viscount Bangor; 1781–1827	Succeeded by Edward Southwell Ward
