= Michael Ward (Irish politician) =

Irish politician and judge

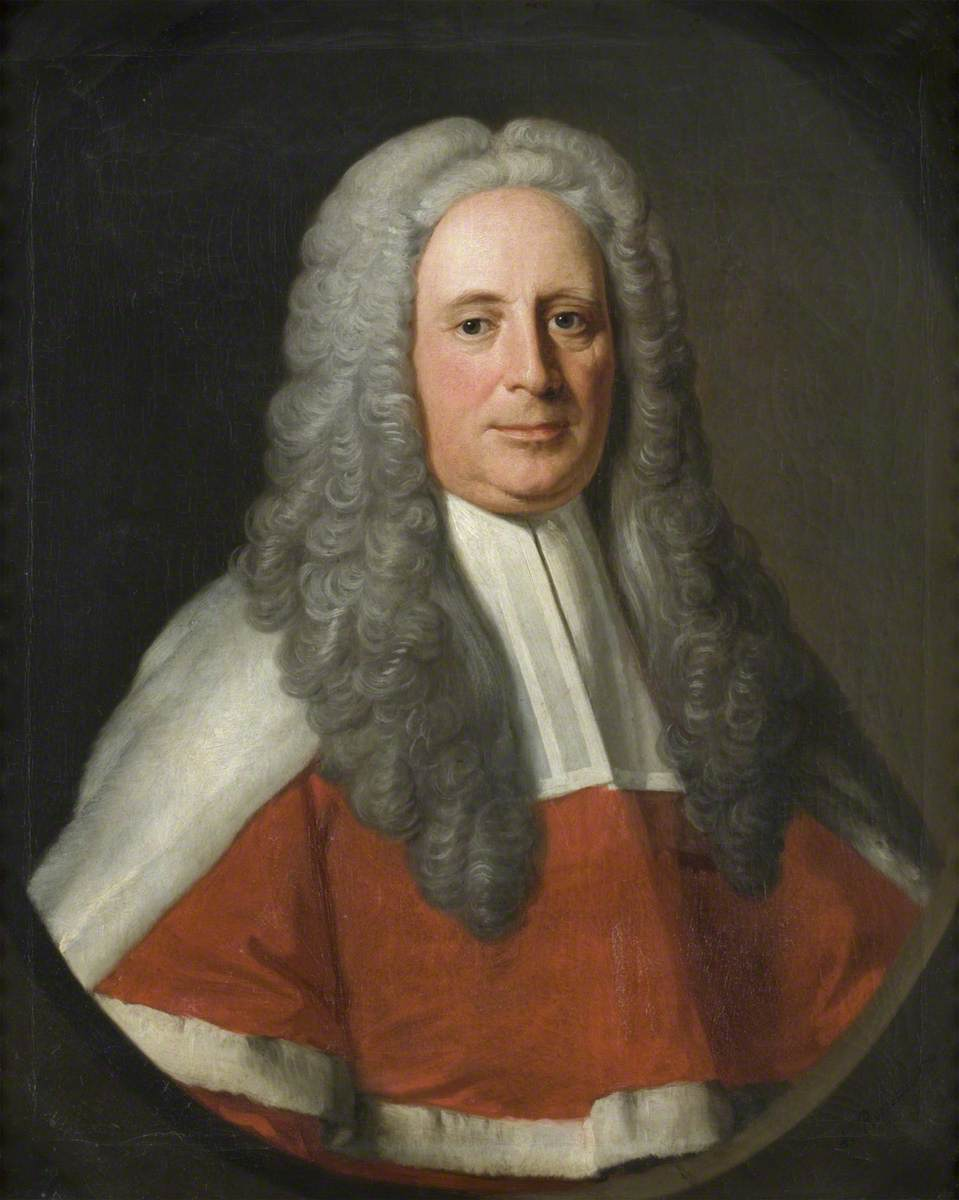
Judge Michael Ward (1683–1759), painting by Allan Ramsay, 1742.

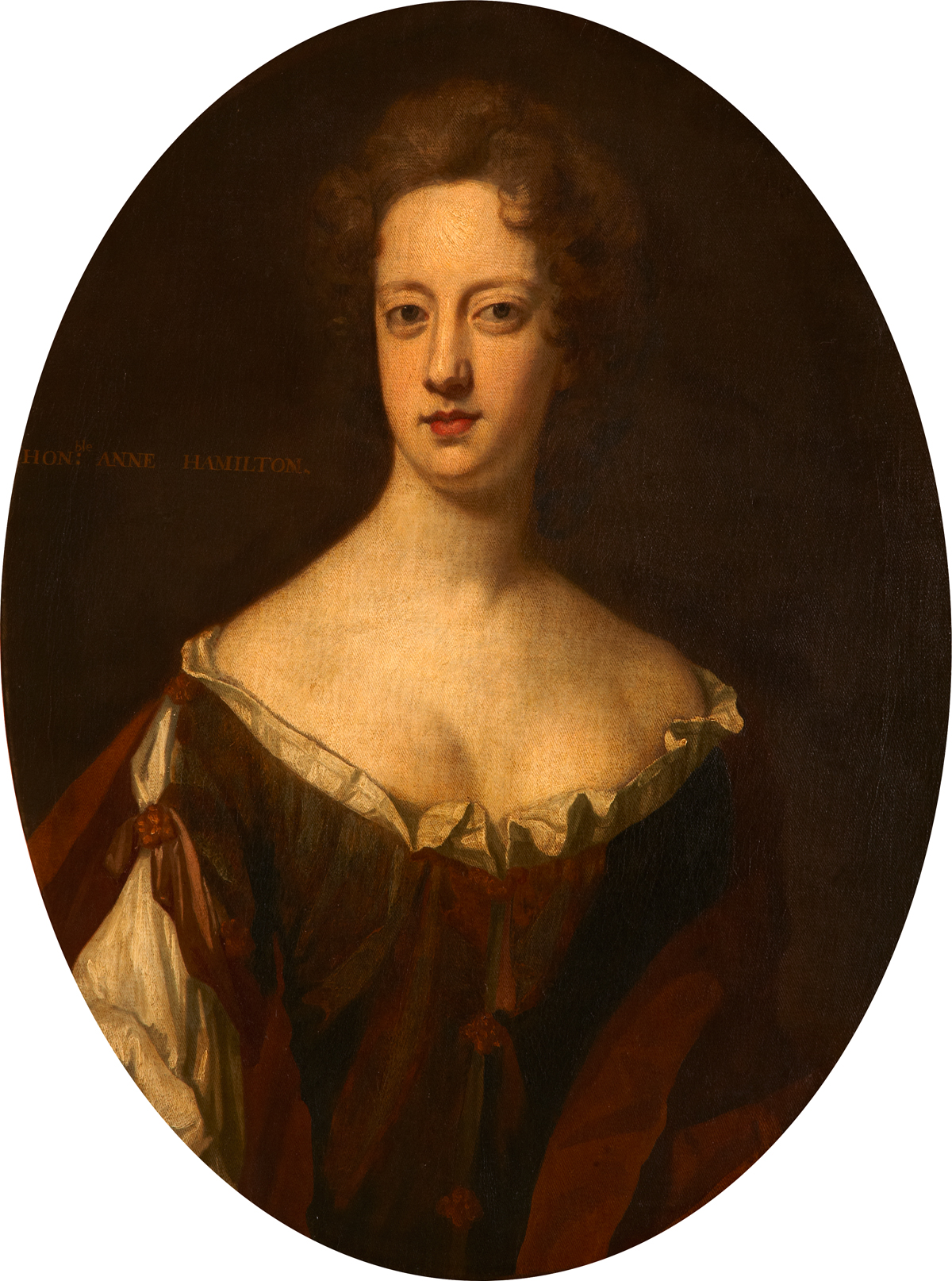
Anne Catharine Hamilton, wife of Michael Ward, portrait attributed to Sir Godfrey Kneller

Michael Ward (1683 – 21 February 1759) was an Irish politician and judge.

He was the second but only surviving son of Bernard Ward of Castle Ward, County Down, and his wife Mary Ward, daughter of Richard Ward of Newport, Shropshire and sister of Michael Ward (died 1681), who was very briefly Bishop of Derry. His father was killed in a duel in 1690, when serving as High Sheriff of Down, by Jocelyn Hamilton of Clanbrassil, who was fatally wounded in return. Michael matriculated from Trinity College Dublin in 1699 and entered the Inner Temple in 1700. He was called to the Irish Bar in 1703.

Ward entered the Irish House of Commons for County Down in 1713. In 1715 and 1727, he stood also for Bangor, (both constituencies had long been controlled by his wife's family, the Hamiltons), but chose to sit for Down both times. In the latter year Ward was appointed a Justice of the Court of King's Bench (Ireland), an office he held until 1758, although increasing ill-health made it impossible for him to sit on the Bench in his last years. He transformed Killough into a port and built a road to Castle Ward, the family's residence, to enable the lead mined on the estate to be carried to the ships.

In 1709, he married Anne Catharine Hamilton, daughter and co-heiress of James Hamilton of Bangor, County Down and Sophia Mordaunt, daughter of John Mordaunt, 1st Viscount Mordaunt and Elizabeth Carey. She died a year after her husband. They had three children, a daughter and two sons. His only surviving son Bernard was elevated to the Peerage of Ireland, first as Baron Bangor in 1770 and then as Viscount Bangor in 1781. His daughter Anne married Sir John Parnell, 1st Baronet; the couple were direct ancestors of Charles Stewart Parnell.

An obituary praised him for his thirty years service on the Bench, during which he had displayed "probity and assiduity".

Parliament of Ireland
Preceded by John Hawkins Magill; Nicholas Price	Member of Parliament for County Down; 1713–1727; With: Nicholas Price 1713–1715; Trevor Hill 1715–1717; Sir John Rawdon, 3rd Bt 1717–1724; Robert Hawkins Magill 1724–1727	Succeeded by Robert Hawkins Magill; Arthur Hill
Preceded by Capel Moore; Robert Ward	Member of Parliament for Bangor; 1715–1716; With: Hans Hamilton	Succeeded by Edward Riggs; Acheson Moore
Preceded by Edward Riggs; Acheson Moore	Member of Parliament for Bangor; 1727; With: Acheson Moore	Succeeded by Sir Robert Maude, 1st Bt; Acheson Moore
