= Clotworthy Rowley of Mount Campbell =

Irish Member of Parliament (~1731–1805)

Clotworthy Rowley (c. 1731 – 1805) was an Anglo-Irish barrister who served as Member of Parliament in the Irish Parliament for the constituency of Downpatrick from 1771 to 1800, and was appointed to but did not sit in the UK Parliament, in 1801, for the same constituency.

== Biography ==
Clotworthy Rowley was the son of Admiral Sir William Rowley and his wife Arabella, daughter of Captain George Dawson of Dawson Park, County Londonderry, Ireland.

He was educated at Trinity Hall, Cambridge and the Inner Temple from 1750, being called to the bar in 1754. He married on 5 May 1763, Letitia, daughter of Samuel Campbell of Mount Campbell, County Leitrim, and through her inherited the Mount Campbell estate. (Note: The Mount Campbell Estate is outside Drumsna, County Leitrim, Ireland.) The family had four sons and one daughter, amongst whom were William Rowley who sat as MP for Kinsale, Josias Rowley, a naval officer who rose to the rank of Admiral; and Samuel Campbell Rowley, who served as a naval officer and an MP in the Irish and UK parliaments.

Rowley sat as Member of Parliament for Downpatrick in the Irish Parliament from 1771 to 1800, according to the History of parliament in the interests of Edward Southwell, 20th Baron de Clifford, who was married to Sophia Campbell, sister of Rowley's wife. He voted with the opposition in the early years of his terms of office, and with the government in later terms.

He was co-opted as Member of Parliament for Downpatrick (UK Parliament constituency) in the Parliament of the United Kingdom in January 1801, but did not take his seat, resigning by February 1801 on being appointed Commissioner of Union Compensation.

Rowley died on 25 March 1805.
