= Edward Hunt (politician) =

Australian politician and businessman

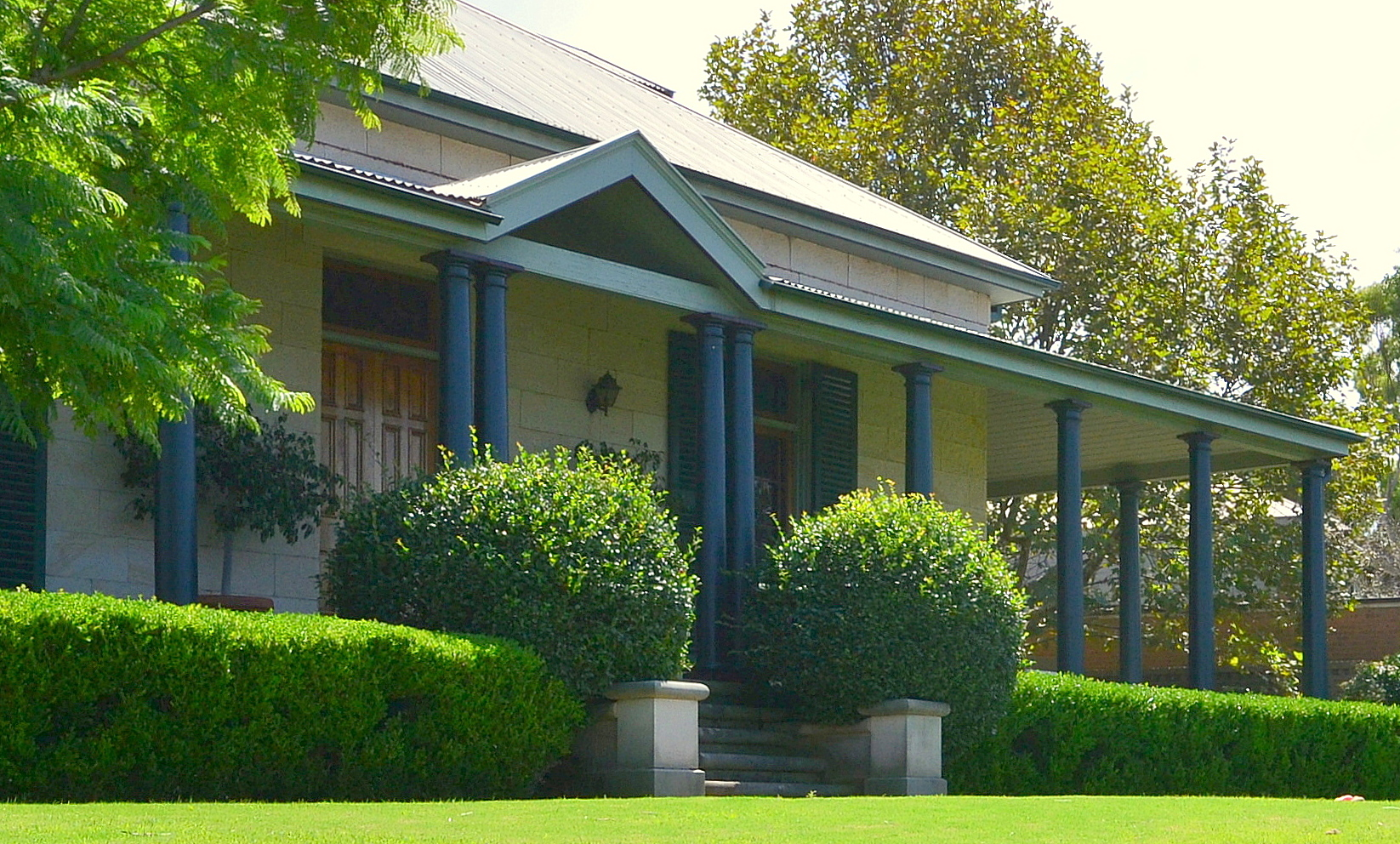
Hampton Villa, Hunt's home in the last years of his life

Edward Hunt (1792–1866) was a businessman and politician who migrated from Great Britain to Australia and made his career in Sydney.

== Life and career ==
Edward Hunt was born in London, England. He was trained as a cabinet maker and then migrated to Australia, arriving in Sydney on 28 January 1814. In Sydney he had a successful career as a businessman and became a leading manufacturer in the cabinet maker industry.

In 1842, Hunt became a founding member of Sydney City Council and in 1858 was appointed to the New South Wales Legislative Council.

On 20 June 1821, Hunt married Hannah Padgett Mason in St John's Church, Parramatta. Two daughters, both named Hannah, are recorded: the first was born 1825 and died 1828, the second born 1828. Hunt and his wife had six children in all.

From 1847 to 1849, Hunt built a fine residence called Hampton Villa in Grafton Street, Balmain. He died in this house in December 1866. The house was later rented by Henry Parkes from 1888 to 1892. It has a state heritage listing.
