= Castle Ward =

Country house in Northern Ireland

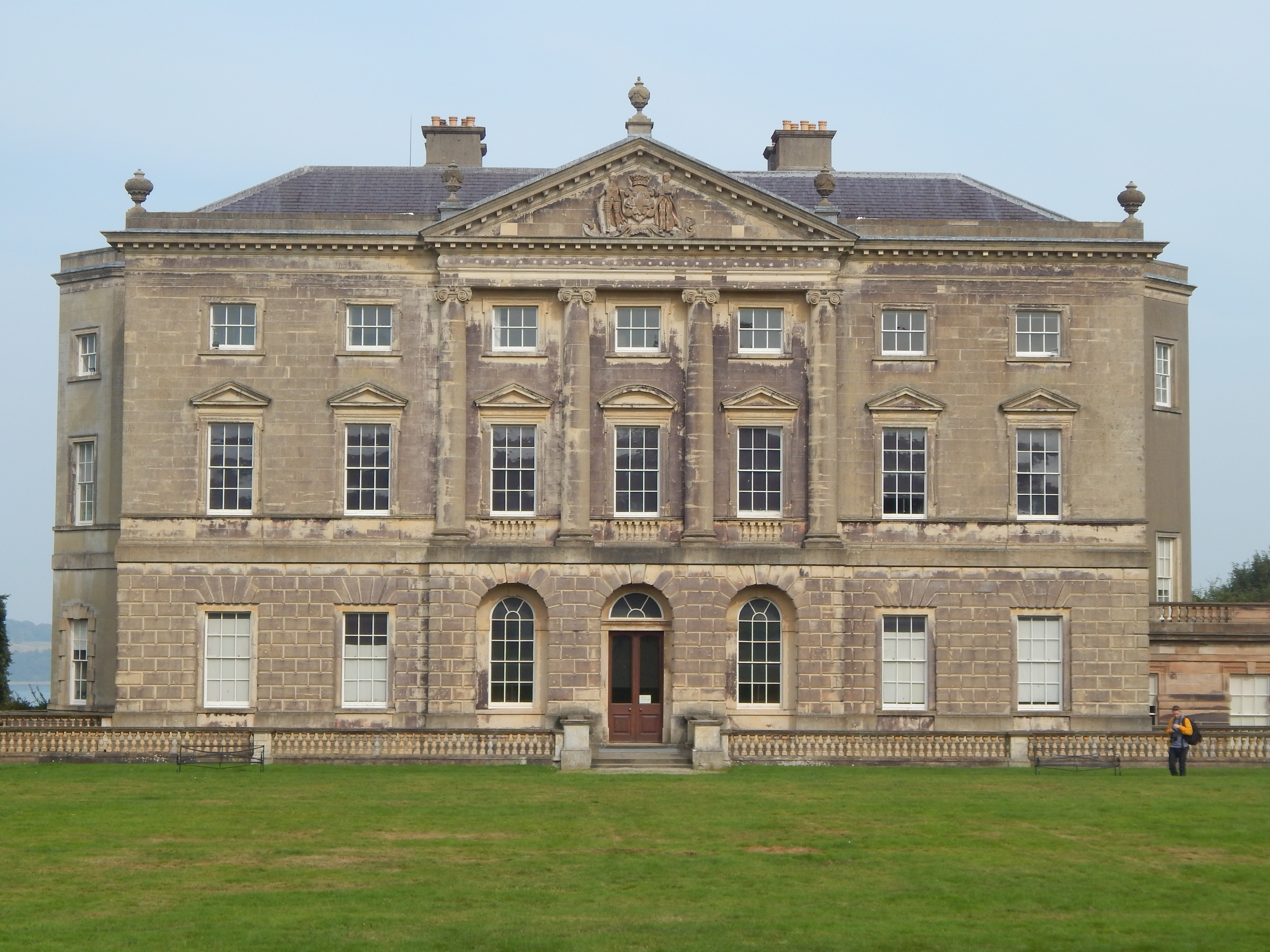
- Castle Ward Classical (south-west) Façade, September 2014
- Interactive map of the Castle Ward area

General information
- Type: House
- Architectural style: Georgian (classical front), Gothic rear
- Coordinates: 54.373°N 5.579°W
- Construction started: 1762
- Estimated completion: 1772
- Owner: National Trust

Technical details
- Material: Bath stone
- Floor count: 3 over basement

Design and construction
- Architects: not known, possibly James Bridges or Thomas Paty of Bristol
- Developer: Bernard Ward, 1st Viscount Bangor

Castle Ward is an 18th-century National Trust property located near the village of Strangford, in County Down, Northern Ireland, in the townland of the same name. It overlooks Strangford Lough and is 7 miles from Downpatrick and 1.5 miles from Strangford.

Castle Ward is open to the public and includes 332 hectares (820 acres) of landscaped gardens, a fortified tower house, Victorian laundry, theatre, restaurant, shop, saw mill and a working corn mill. It has a shore on Strangford Lough. From 1985 to 2010 it has also hosted Castleward Opera, an annual summer opera festival.

== Features ==
Castle Ward is known for its dual architecture, representing the differing tastes of Bernard Ward, 1st Viscount Bangor and his wife, Lady Ann Bligh. While the entrance side of the building is in a classical Palladian style with columns supporting a triangular pediment, the opposite side is Georgian Gothic with pointed windows, battlements and finials. This difference in style continues throughout the interior of the house with the divide down the centre.

There is a tower house in the estate's farmyard, built as a defensive structure during 1610 by Nicholas Ward.

== History ==
The north end of Strangford Manor was originally called Carrick na Sheannagh (from Irish carraig na sionnach 'rock of the foxes') and owned by the Earls of Kildare. In 1570, it was bought by Bernard Ward, father of Sir Robert Ward, Surveyor-General of Ireland, and renamed Castle Ward. The 850 acre walled demesne also dates from the 16th century. The Ward family built a succession of homes in their estate; Old Castle Ward, built about 1590 near to Strangford Lough, still survives, but a mansion built about 1720 by Judge Michael Ward was demolished about 1850, although some of the associated landscaping remains.

The architect of the current building, built during the early 1760s for Michael Ward's son, Bernard Ward, is unknown, although he may have come from the Bristol area, with which the Ward family had associations. It may have been James Bridges, who practised in Bristol between 1757 and 1763 and whose work there has some similarity to Castle Ward. Bernard Ward was elevated to the Peerage of Ireland as the 1st Baron Bangor in May 1770. In January 1781, Lord Bangor was further advanced in the Peerage of Ireland when he was created the 1st Viscount Bangor.

The property was inherited in May 1781, under a settlement made in 1748, by the 1st Viscount's eldest son and heir apparent, Nicholas Ward, 2nd Viscount Bangor, who was clearly insane. When his younger brother, Edward, died in 1812, leaving a young son, the youngest brother Robert took the opportunity to relocate the insane Lord Bangor into a smaller house in Downpatrick and strip Castle Ward of everything valuable. The house stood empty until the death of the 2nd Viscount in September 1827, when it was inherited by Edward's son, also named Edward, now the 3rd Viscount. He and his descendants restored the building and its furnishings, but on the death of Maxwell Ward, 6th Viscount Bangor in 1950 the house and estate were given in lieu of death duties to the Government of Northern Ireland, who presented the house and its gardens to the National Trust in 1952.

On 10 February 1973, Leonard O'Hanlon (age 23) and Vivienne Fitzsimmons (age 17), both members of the Provisional Irish Republican Army, were killed when the bomb they planted exploded prematurely in the grounds of Castle Ward estate.

=== Gallery ===
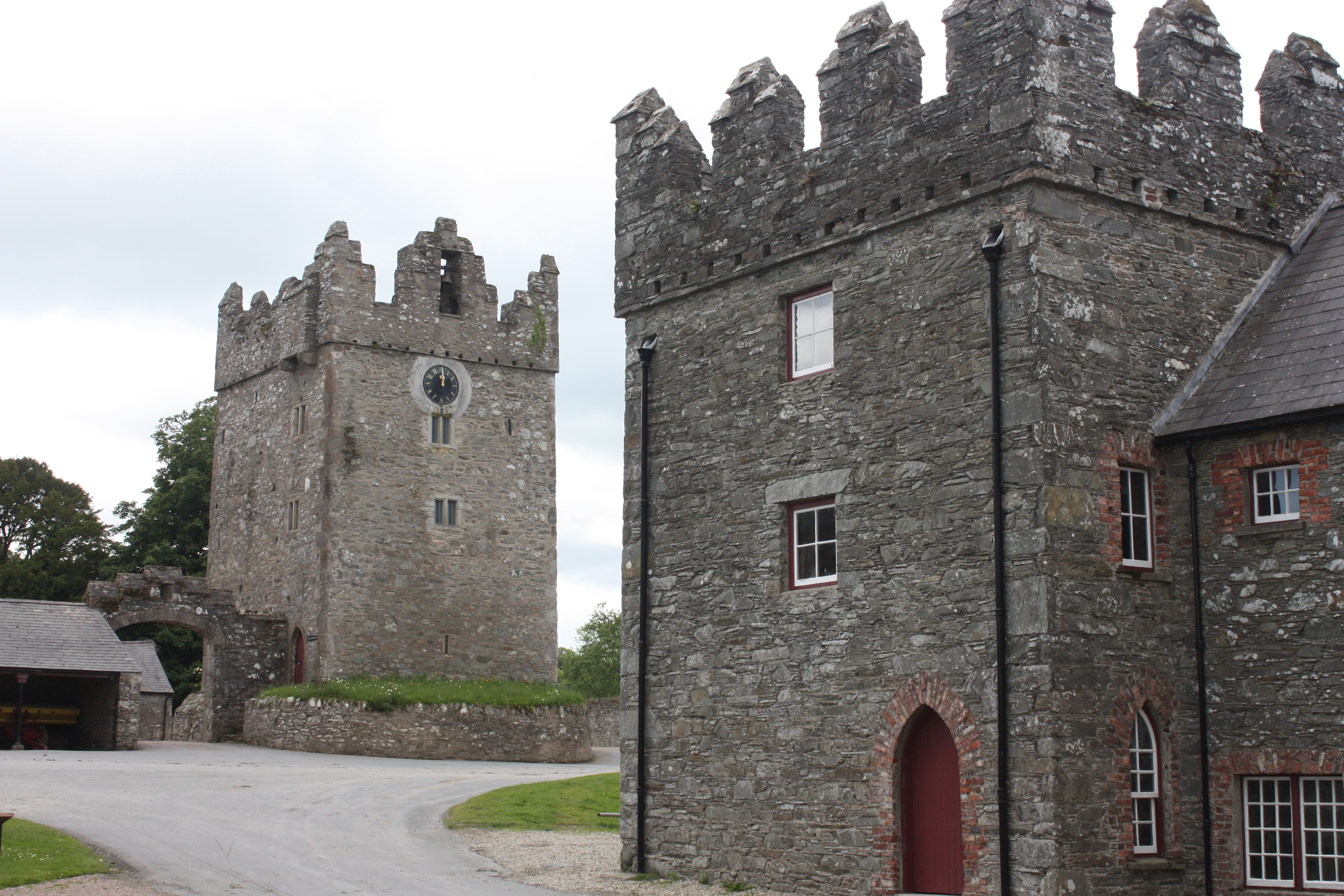
Old Castle Ward

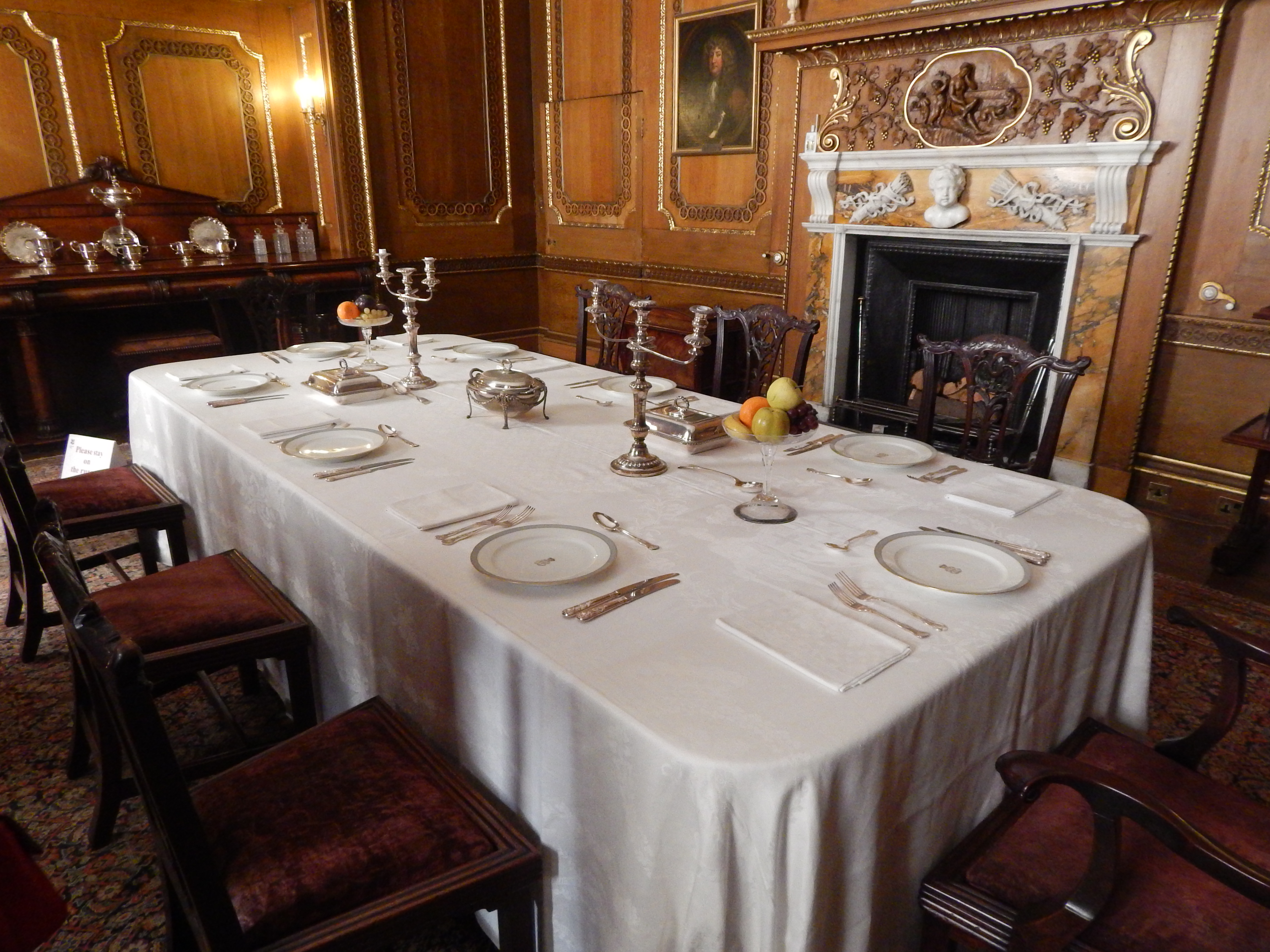
The dining room.

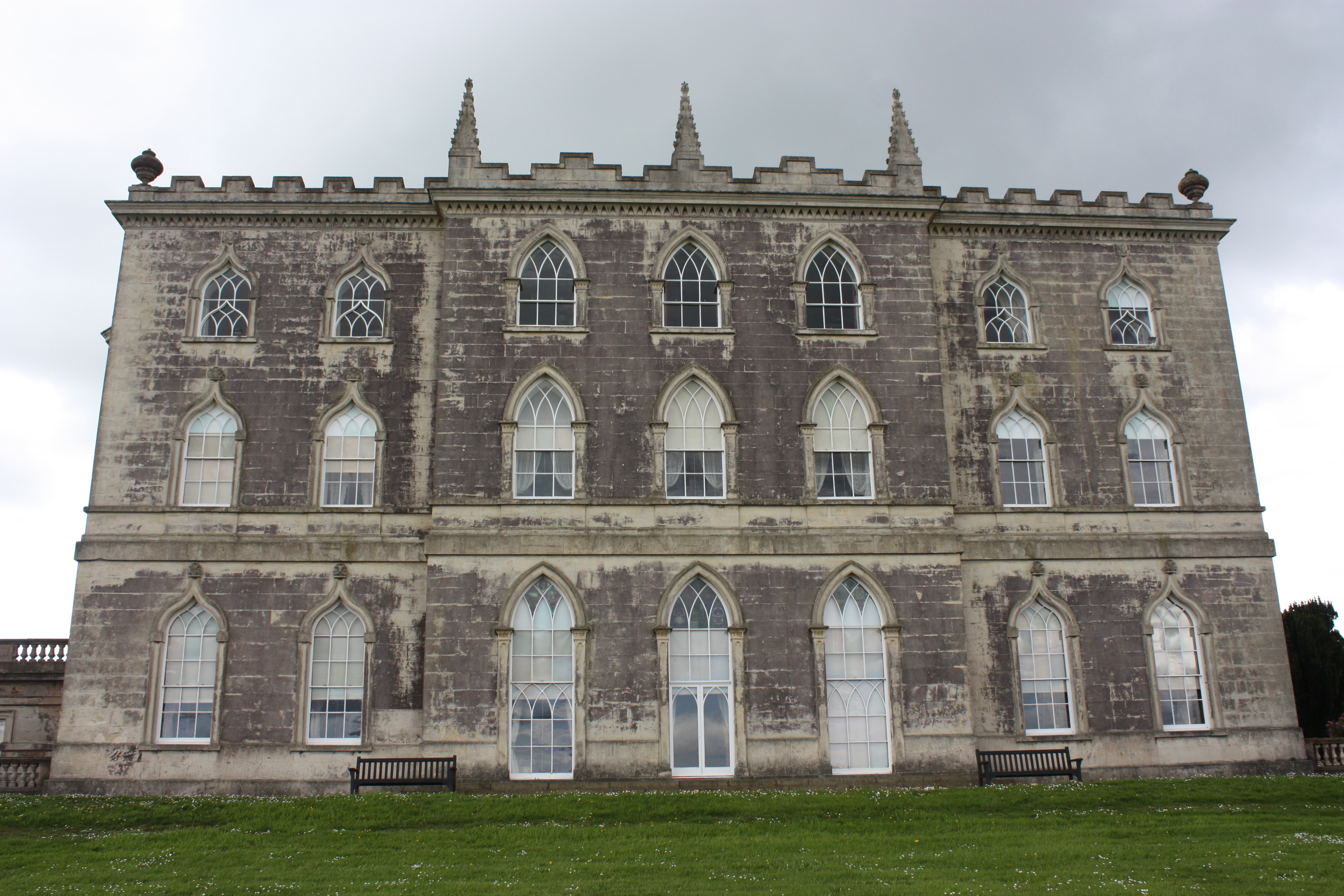
Castle Ward Gothic (north-east) façade, June 2011.

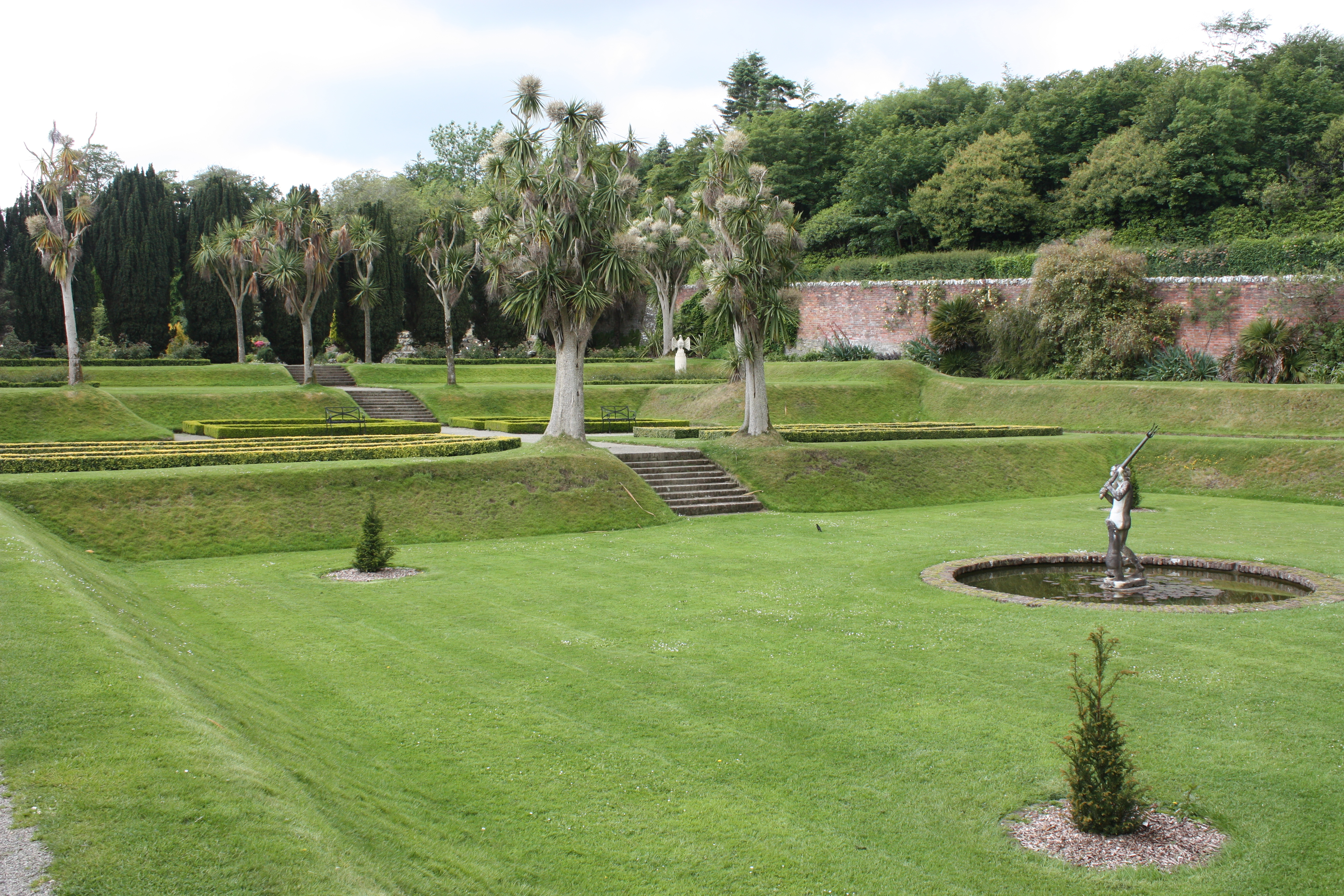
Walled Garden, June 2011.

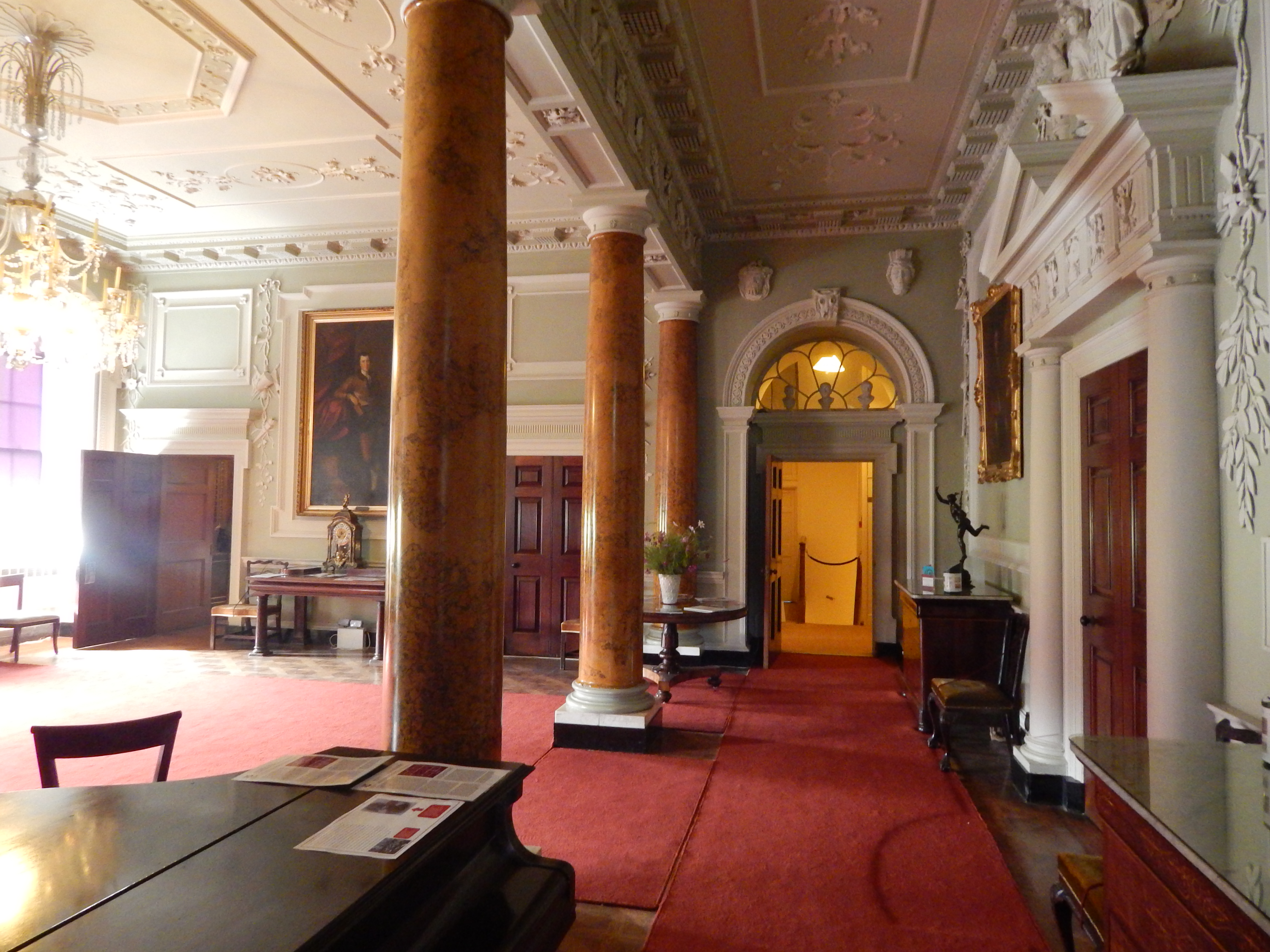
Grand hallway to front entrance.

== In popular culture ==
Castle Ward was used as a filming location for Winterfell in the HBO television series Game of Thrones.

== See also ==
- The Troubles in Strangford
