= Arthur Hill-Trevor, 1st Viscount Dungannon =

Irish politician

Arthur Hill-Trevor, 1st Viscount Dungannon (c. 1694 – 30 January 1771), was an Irish politician.

Born Arthur Hill, he adopted the surname Hill-Trevor in 1759. He was the second son of Michael Hill of Hillsborough, M.P. and Privy Councillor, and Anne Trevor. His maternal grandfather was the leading seventeenth-century statesman Sir John Trevor. Arthur's elder brother was Trevor Hill. 1st Viscount Hillsborough, father of the 1st Marquess of Downshire. He was grandfather to Arthur Wellesley, 1st Duke of Wellington

He represented Hillsborough in the Irish House of Commons from November 1715 and then County Down from 1727 until he was raised to the Irish House of Lords when created Viscount Dungannon and Baron Hill of Olderfleet in the Peerage of Ireland on 17 February 1766. He was appointed High Sheriff of Down for 1736 and appointed to the Privy Council of Ireland on 13 August 1750.

== Marriages and children ==
He married firstly Barbara Deane (who died young), of Crumlin, Dublin, daughter of Joseph Deane, Chief Baron of the Irish Exchequer; and secondly in 1737 Anne Stafford of Brownstown, County Meath (marriage settlement dated 11 January 1737/8), by whom he had three children. Their only son predeceased his father and the title passed to their grandson, Arthur Hill-Trevor, 2nd Viscount Dungannon. Through his daughter, Anne, who married Garret Wesley, 1st Earl of Mornington, Lord Dungannon was maternal grandfather of the 1st Duke of Wellington. All three of his children had issue.

- Hon. Arthur Hill Trevor (24 December 1738 - 19 June 1770), m. the Hon. Letitia Morres, daughter of Hervey Morres, 1st Viscount Mountmorres and Lady Letitia Ponsonby
- Hon. Anne Hill-Trevor (23 June 1742 - 10 September 1831), m. Garret Wesley, 1st Earl of Mornington, son of Richard Wesley, 1st Baron Mornington and Elizabeth Sale, on 6 February 1759; they were parents, among others, of Arthur Wellesley, 1st Duke of Wellington and Richard Wellesley, 1st Marquess Wellesley
- Hon. Prudence Penelope Hill-Trevor (born 17 Mar 1745), m. Charles Powell Leslie (1731–1800), son of Robert Leslie and Frances Rogerson

== Ancestors ==
Ancestors of Arthur Hill-Trevor, 1st Viscount Dungannon

4. William Hill
2. Michael Hill
10. Michael Boyle, Archbishop of Armagh
5. Eleanor Boyle
11. Mary O'Brien
1. Arthur Hill-Trevor, 1st Viscount Dungannon
12. John Trevor
6. Sir John Trevor
13. Jane Jeffreys
3. Anne Trevor
14. Sir Roger Mostyn, 1st Baronet
7. Jane Mostyn
15. Prudence Lumley

Parliament of Ireland
Preceded by Trevor Hill; Samuel Waring	Member of Parliament for Hillsborough; 1715 – 1727; With: Samuel Waring	Succeeded by Thomas Carter; Francis Stoyte
Preceded by Michael Ward; Robert Hawkins Magill	Member of Parliament for County Down; 1727 – 1766; With: Robert Hawkins Magill to 1745; Bernard Ward from 1745	Succeeded by Henry Seymour-Conway; Bernard Ward
Peerage of Ireland
New creation	Viscount Dungannon; 2nd creation 1766–1771	Succeeded by Arthur Hill-Trevor
