= Arthur Trevor (MP) =

Irish politician

Arthur Trevor (24 December 1738 – 19 June 1770) was an Irish politician.

He was MP for Hillsborough from 1761 to 1770.
