= John Congreve =

Irish politician

John Congreve was an Irish politician.

Congreve was born in County Cork and educated at Trinity College, Dublin.

Congreve represented Killyleagh from 1761 to 1768.
