= 1761 Irish general election =

All 300 seats of the House of Commons 151 seats were needed for a majority
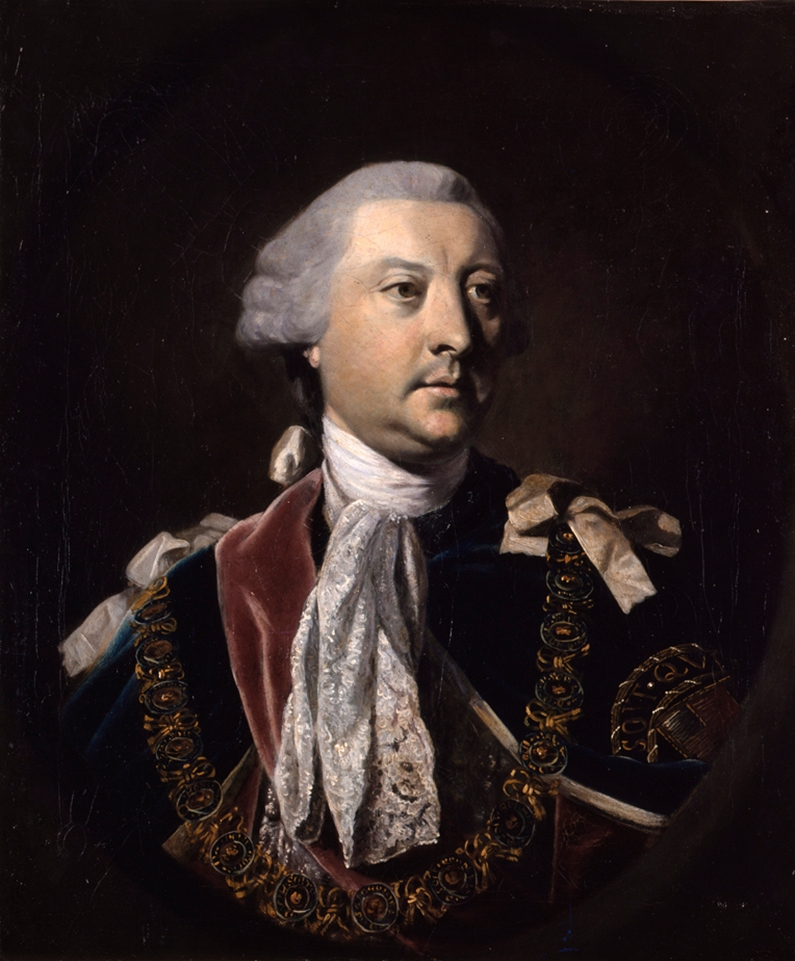

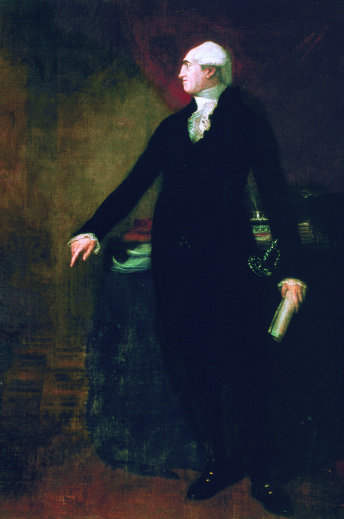
	First party	Second party
Leader	Earl of Halifax	Henry Flood
Party	Tory	Patriot
Popular vote	-	-
Percentage	-	-

The 1761 Irish general election was the first general election to the Irish House of Commons in over thirty years, with the previous general election having taken place in 1727. Despite few constituencies hosting electoral contests, the election was significant due to it taking place in a time of rising political awareness within the Irish public, with many being drawn to the cause of patriotism.

== Background ==
Unlike England, which had passed the Triennial Acts in 1694, thereby requiring elections every 3 years (and following 1716 every 7 years), Ireland had passed no similar pieces of legislation. As a result, the only limit on a term of parliament was the life of the monarch. This did not mean that the Commons had the same membership between 1727 and 1761, and numerous vacancies had occurred over the years, which had in turn been filled through by-elections.

By the late 1750s the lack of frequent elections was becoming a contested issue, and the issue was taken up by the patriot opposition in the House of Commons. This had seen some success, and in November 1757 the Commons had voted unanimously for heads of a bill on the subject.

In October 1760 King George II died, thereby making a new election unavoidable. Adding to this was that none of Britain's Chief Undertakers in Ireland; the Earl of Shannon, Archbishoper George Stone, John Ponsonby, or any other members of the Privy Council, were willing to risk the electoral consequences that would ensue should it appear they were not taking a popular and patriotic stance.

== Election ==
Despite being the first general election in over 30 years, and the fact that the period preceding the election had seen great debate over implementing changes to the electoral system so as to make elections more common, ultimately the election result was largely anticlimactic, with only 26 of Ireland's 150 constituencies actually witnessing any form of electoral contest. Of these 26 constituencies 9 were counties and 17 were boroughs.

There were several reasons for the low number of electoral contests. One issue was a sense of political apathy, whilst the other was that the immense costs of standing for election dissuaded individuals from standing.

== Dates of election ==
At this period elections did not take place at the same time in every constituency. The returning officer in each county or parliamentary borough fixed the precise date (see hustings for details of the conduct of the elections).

== Constituencies hosting contests ==
- Counties
  - County Antrim
  - County Cavan
- Boroughs
  - Dublin City

== See also ==
- List of parliaments of Ireland
- MPs elected in the Irish general election, 1761
