= County Down (Parliament of Ireland constituency) =

Pre-1801 Irish constituency

Coordinates: 54.557°N 6.311°W

- Former county constituency for the Irish House of Commons
- County: County Down

–1801
- Seats: 2
- Replaced by: Down (UKHC)

County Down was a constituency represented in the Irish House of Commons until 1800.

== History ==
In the Patriot Parliament of 1689 summoned by James II, Down was represented with two members.

== Members of Parliament ==
Election	First MP	Second MP
1585	Sir Nicholas Bagnoll of The Newry, County Down	Sir Hugh Magennies of Rathfriland, County Down
1613	Sir James Hamilton of Bangor and Killileagh, County Down	Sir Hugh Montgomery of Newtown, County Down
1634	Sir Hugh Montgomery of Newtown, County Down	Sir James Hamilton of Bangor and Killileagh, County Down
1639	Sir Edward Trevor of Rosetrevor, County Down	Sir James Montgomery of Rosemount, Greyabbey, County Down
1661	Marcus Trevor of Rosetrevor, County Down	Arthur Hill of Hillsborough, County Down
1662 by-election (Note: Caused by the creation of Trevor as Viscount Dungannon)	Vere Essex Cromwell	Arthur Hill of Hillsborough, County Down
1665 by-election (Note: Caused by death of Hill in April 1663)	Vere Essex Cromwell	Marcus Trevor of Rosetrevor, County Down (Note: A son of the man elected in 1661 - see Edward M. Furgol, ‘Trevor, Marcus, first Viscount Dungannon (1618–1670)’, Oxford Dictionary of National Biography, Oxford University Press, 2004; online edn, May 2008 accessed 15 May 2014)
1689	Murtagh Magennis of Greencastle, County Down	Ever Magennis of Castlewellan, County Down
1692	James Hamilton	Sir Arthur Rawdon, 2nd Bt
1695	James Hamilton	Sir Arthur Rawdon, 2nd Bt
1695 by-election (Note: Caused by the death of Rawdon)	James Hamilton	Nicholas Price
1703	John Hawkins Magill	Nicholas Price
1713	Michael Ward	Nicholas Price
1715	Michael Ward	Trevor Hill
1717 by-election (Note: Caused by Hill's creation as Viscount Hillsborough)	Michael Ward	Sir John Rawdon, 3rd Bt
1724 by-election (Note: Caused by the death of Rawdon)	Michael Ward	Robert Hawkins Magill
1727	Arthur Hill (Note: Changed surname to Hill-Trevor in 1759)	Robert Hawkins Magill
1745 by-election (Note: Caused by the death of Hawkins-Magill)	Arthur Hill	Bernard Ward
1761	Arthur Hill	Bernard Ward
1766 by-election (Note: Caused by Hill-Trevor's creation as Viscount Dungannon)	Henry Seymour-Conway	Bernard Ward
1768	Roger Hall	Bernard Ward
1771 by-election (Note: Caused by Ward's creation as Baron Bangor)	Roger Hall	Robert Stewart
1776	Arthur Hill, Viscount Kilwarlin (Note: Styled as Earl of Hillsborough from 1789)	Robert Stewart
1783	Arthur Hill, Viscount Kilwarlin	Hon. Edward Ward
1790	Arthur Hill, Viscount Kilwarlin	Hon. Robert Stewart (Note: Styled as Viscount Castlereagh from 1796)
1794 by-election (Note: Caused by Hill's succession as second Marquess of Downshire)	Francis Savage	Hon. Robert Stewart
1801	Succeeded by the Westminster constituency Down	

== Elections ==
=== Elections in the 1790s ===
At the 1797 general election Francis Savage and Robert Stewart, Viscount Castlereagh were elected unopposed.

At the by-election in 1793 following Hill's succession as second Marquess of Downshire, Francis Savage was returned unopposed.

General Election 1790: Down
Party	Candidate	Votes	%	±%
Nonpartisan	Arthur Hill, Earl of Hillsborough	3534	29.88	▼11.39
Tory	Hon. Robert Stewart	3114	26.33	▼2.20
Nonpartisan	Hon. Edward Ward	2958	25.00	▼5.19
Nonpartisan	Captain George Matthews	2223	18.79	N/A

=== Election in the 1780s ===
General Election 1783: Down
Party	Candidate	Votes	%	±%
Nonpartisan	Arthur Hill, Viscount Kilwarlin	2831	41.27	N/A
Nonpartisan	Hon. Edward Ward	2071	30.19	N/A
Tory	Robert Stewart	1957	28.53	N/A

=== Elections in the 1770s ===
At the 1776 general election Arthur Hill, Viscount Kilwarlin and Robert Stewart were elected unopposed.

At the by-election in 1771 following Ward's creation as Baron Bangor

=== Elections in the 1760s ===
At the 1768 general election Roger Hall and Bernard Ward were elected unopposed.

=== Election in the 1610s ===
General Election 1613: Down
Party	Candidate	Votes	%	±%
Nonpartisan	Sir James Hamilton	131		N/A
Nonpartisan	Sir Hugh Montgomery	131		N/A
Nonpartisan	Sir Arthur Magennis	101		N/A
Nonpartisan	Rowland Savage	101		N/A

"In the co. of Down, May-day was the county court day for the election, which the sheriff held at Newry, at which day the sheriff proceeding to the election, moved the freeholders to choose Sir Richard Wingfield and Sir James Hamilton, being recommended to him by the Lord Deputy; but the natives named Sir Arthur Magenisse and Rowland Savage; whereupon all the British freeholders, being 131, cried “Hamilton and Montgomery”, omitting Wingfield; and the Irish, to the number of 101, cried “Magenisse and Savage”. Exception being presently taken to divers of the British for want of freehold, 14 were examined on oath by the sheriff and deposed they were freeholders, and thereupon the sheriff returned Hamilton and Montgomery; to which some of the Irish made objections, which were found partly untrue, and partly frivolous."

== Bibliography ==
- O'Hart, John (2007). The Irish and Anglo-Irish Landed Gentry: When Cromwell came to Ireland. Vol. II. Heritage Books. ISBN 978-0-7884-1927-0.
- Leigh Rayment's historical List of Members of the Irish House of Commons. Cites: Johnston-Liik, Edith Mary (2002). The History of the Irish Parliament 1692-1800 (6 volumes). Ulster Historical Foundation.
- Peter Jupp, County Down Elections, 1783–1831, Irish Historical Studies 18, no. 70 (1972): 177–206
- Johnston-Liik, Edith Mary (2002). History of the Irish Parliament 1692–1800, Volume II, Commons, Constituencies and Statutes. Ulster Historical Foundation. ISBN 1-903688-71-X.
