= Lady Caroline Blackwood =

English writer (1931–1996)

Caroline Blackwood
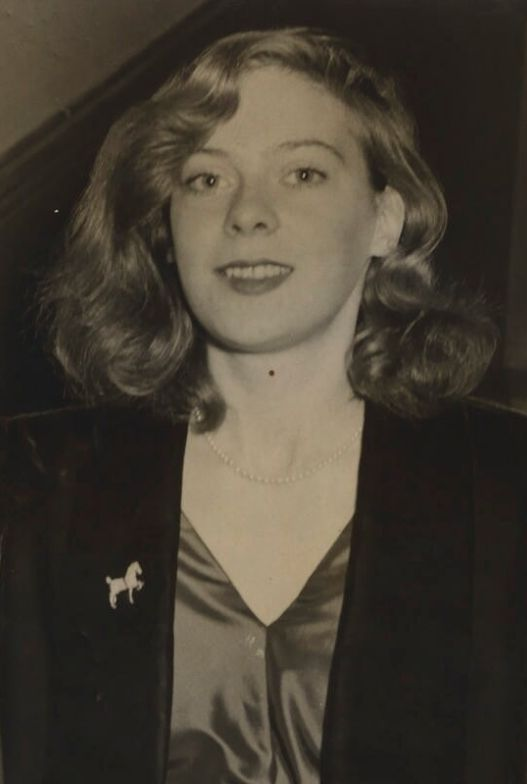
- Blackwood in 1953
- Born: Caroline Maureen Hamilton-Temple-Blackwood; 16 July 1931; London, England
- Died: 14 February 1996 (aged 64); New York City, U.S.
- Occupation: Writer
- Years active: 1973–1995
- Spouses: Lucian Freud (m. 1953; div. 1959) Israel Citkowitz (m. 1959; div. 1972) Robert Lowell (m. 1972; died 1977)
- Children: 4, including Eugenia
- Parents: Maureen Constance Guinness; The 4th Marquess of Dufferin and Ava
- Relatives: The 3rd Marquess of Dufferin and Ava (grandfather); Ernest Guinness (grandfather); Aileen Plunket (aunt); Oonagh Guinness (aunt); Gay Kindersley (cousin); The 5th Marquess of Dufferin and Ava (brother); Garech Browne (cousin); Tara Browne (cousin); Lindy, Marchioness of Dufferin and Ava (fourth cousin and sister-in-law); Julian Sands (son-in-law)
- Family: Guinness

Lady Caroline Maureen Hamilton-Temple-Blackwood (16 July 1931 – 14 February 1996), known as Caroline Blackwood, was an English writer, socialite, and muse. Her novels have been praised for their wit and intelligence. One of her works is an autobiography, which detailed her wealthy but unhappy childhood. She was born into an aristocratic British family, the eldest child of the 4th Marquess of Dufferin and Ava and of Maureen Constance Guinness. Her husbands were accomplished figures in their own fields.

== Early life ==
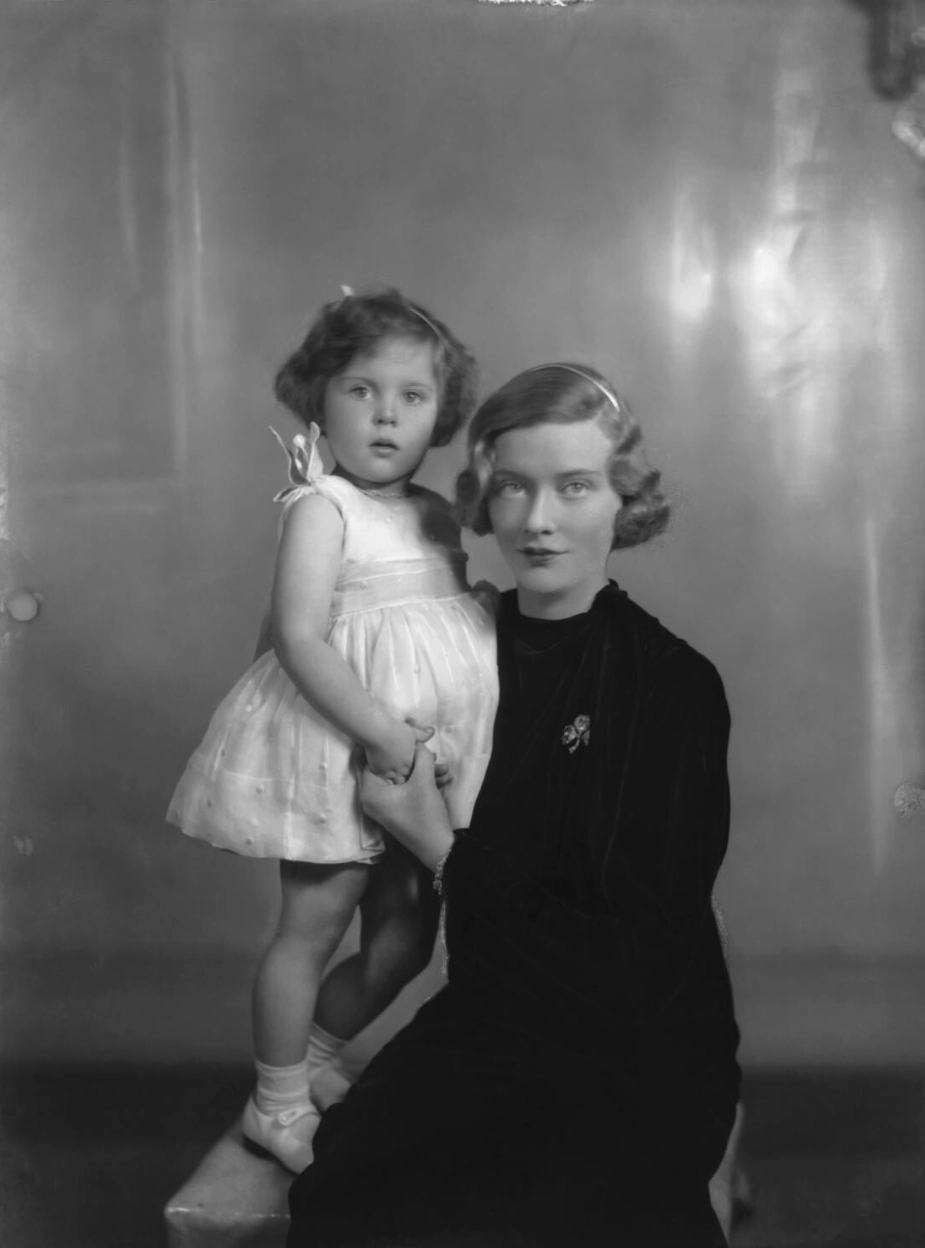
Blackwood and her mother Maureen Constance Guinness in 1933

Caroline Maureen Hamilton-Temple-Blackwood was born on 16 July 1931 at 4 Hans Crescent in Knightsbridge, her parents' London home. Her parents, the 4th Marquess of Dufferin and Ava and Maureen Constance Guinness, were both from Anglo-Irish families.

Blackwood was, self-admittedly, "scantily educated" at Rockport School in County Down and Downham School near Hatfield Heath, Essex, among other schools.

In 1949, after a finishing school in Oxford, Blackwood was presented as a debutante at a ball held at Londonderry House.

== Career ==
Blackwood's first job was with Hulton Press as a secretary, but she was soon given small reporting jobs by Claud Cockburn. In Paris she met Picasso (and reportedly refused to wash for three days after he drew on her hands and nails).

After marrying artist Lucian Freud in 1953, she became a figure in London's bohemian circles, the Gargoyle Club and Colony Room replacing Belgravia drawing rooms. She sat for several of Freud's portraits, including Girl in Bed. She was impressed by the vision of Freud and painter Francis Bacon, and her later fiction was influenced by their view of humanity.

In the early 1960s, Blackwood began contributing to Encounter, London Magazine, and other periodicals on subjects such as beatniks, Ulster sectarianism, feminist theatre and New York free schools. According to Christopher Isherwood, "she is only capable of thinking negatively. Confronted by a phenomenon, she asks herself: what is wrong with it?" During the mid-1960s, she had an affair with Robert Silvers, the American founder and co-editor of The New York Review of Books.

Her third husband, American poet Robert Lowell, was an influence on her talents as a novelist. He encouraged her to write her first book, For All That I Found There (1973), the title of which is a line from the Percy French song "The Mountains of Mourne". It includes a memoir of her daughter's treatment in a burns unit.

Blackwood published her first novel The Stepdaughter (1976) three years later, and it received much acclaim and won the David Higham Prize for best first novel.

Great Granny Webster followed in 1977 and was partly derived from her own childhood. It depicts an old woman's destructive impact on her daughter and granddaughter. It was short-listed for the 1977 Booker Prize.

The Last of the Duchess was completed in 1980. A study of the relations between the Duchess of Windsor and her lawyer, Suzanne Blum, it could not be published until after Blum's death in 1995.

Blackwood's third novel, The Fate of Mary Rose (1981), describes the effect on a Kent village of the rape and torture of a ten-year-old girl named Maureen. It is narrated by a historian whose obsessions destroy his domestic life.

After this, she completed a collection of five short stories, Good Night Sweet Ladies (1983). Her final novel, Corrigan, was published in 1984.

Blackwood's later books were based on interviews and vignettes, including On The Perimeter (1984), which focused her attentions on the Greenham Common Women's Peace Camp at RAF Greenham Common in Berkshire, and In The Pink (1987), which explores the hunting and the hunt saboteur fraternities.

== Published works ==
Blackwood published 10 books during her lifetime. Never Breathe a Word: The Collected Stories of Caroline Blackwood was published posthumously.

=== Novels ===
- The Stepdaughter (1976) ISBN 978-0-7156-0967-5
- Great Granny Webster (1977) ISBN 978-1-59017-538-5
- The Fate of Mary Rose (1981) ISBN 978-0-224-01791-6
- Corrigan (1984) ISBN 978-1-59017-539-2

=== Collections ===
- For All That I Found There (1973) ISBN 978-0-8076-0742-8
- Good Night Sweet Ladies (1983) ISBN 978-0-434-07465-5
- Never Breathe a Word: The Collected Stories of Caroline Blackwood (2010) ISBN 978-1-58243-707-1

=== Other ===
- (with Anna Haycraft) Darling, You Shouldn’t Have Gone to So Much Trouble (1980) ISBN 978-0-224-01834-0
- On the Perimeter (1984) ISBN 978-0-14-008322-4
- In the Pink (1987) ISBN 978-0-7475-0050-6
- The Last of the Duchess (1995) ISBN 978-0-517-17722-8

== Personal life ==
Blackwood was married three times, and had four children.

- Lucian Freud, married 9 December 1953, divorced 1959.
- Israel Citkowitz, married 15 August 1959, divorced 1972, three daughters, including Natalya, Eugenia, and Ivana
- Robert Lowell, married 21 October 1972, one son.

Ann Fleming, the wife of Ian Fleming, introduced Blackwood to Lucian Freud. After they started seeing each other, the couple eloped in Paris on 9 December 1953.

By 1966, when Blackwood and Citkowitz's youngest child was born, their marriage was over. Citkowitz continued to live nearby and helped raise their daughters until his death.

During the mid-1960s, Blackwood had an affair with Robert Silvers, a founder and co-editor of The New York Review of Books. He stayed close to the family thereafter. According to Ivana, she and Silvers both suspected that he was her biological father. But Blackwood revealed on her deathbed that Ivana's father was another lover: the screenwriter Ivan Moffat. He was a grandson of actor-manager Sir Herbert Beerbohm Tree and his wife.

On 22 June 1978, Natalya, Blackwood's eldest daughter with Citkowitz, died at age 17 from postural asphyxia due to a drug overdose.

Blackwood and Lowell lived in London and at Milgate House in Kent. The sequence of poems in Lowell's The Dolphin (1973) provides a disrupted narrative of his involvement with Blackwood and the birth of their son. (Lowell's friend, fellow poet Elizabeth Bishop, strongly advised Lowell not to publish the book, advice he ignored). Lowell suffered from bipolar disorder, and Blackwood reacted to his manic episodes with distress, confusion, feelings of uselessness, and fear about the effects on their children.

In 1977, Lowell died, reportedly clutching one of Freud's portraits of Blackwood, while in the back seat of a New York cab. He was returning to his former wife, the writer Elizabeth Hardwick.

Ten years later, in 1987, she moved to the United States, settling in a large house in Sag Harbor, on eastern Long Island in New York. Although her abilities were reduced by alcoholism, she continued to write; her work of that era includes two memoirs, of Princess Margaret and of Francis Bacon, published in The New York Review of Books in 1992.

== Death ==
On 14 February 1996, Lady Caroline Blackwood died from cancer, at the Mayfair Hotel on Park Avenue in New York City, aged 64.
