= Lady Dufferin =

Lady Dufferin may refer to:

- Helen Blackwood, Baroness Dufferin and Claneboye (1807–1867), songwriter, poet, and society lady
- Hariot Hamilton-Temple-Blackwood, Marchioness of Dufferin and Ava (1843–1935), who supported her husband's diplomatic work in Canada and India, where she founded many hospitals for women
  - Lady Dufferin Hospital, Pakistan, named after the above
- Maureen Constance Guinness (1907–1998), society figure who married Basil Hamilton-Temple-Blackwood, 4th Marquess of Dufferin and Ava in 1930
- Lindy Hamilton-Temple-Blackwood, Marchioness of Dufferin and Ava, artist, chatelaine of Clandeboye, and widow of Sheridan Hamilton-Temple-Blackwood, 5th Marquess of Dufferin and Ava

== See also ==
- Baron Dufferin and Claneboye
