= Evgenia Citkowitz =

American author and journalist (born 1964)

- Born: Eugenia Citkowitz; 1964 (age 61–62); New York, U.S.
- Occupations: Playwright, author, journalist
- Years active: 2007–present
- Spouse: Julian Sands (m. 1990; died 2023)
- Children: 2
- Parents: Israel Citkowitz; Lady Caroline Blackwood
- Relatives: Maureen Constance Guinness (grandmother); The 4th Marquess of Dufferin and Ava (grandfather); Robert Lowell (stepfather)
- Family: Guinness
- Website: evgeniacitkowitz.com

Evgenia Citkowitz (born Eugenia Citkowitz; 1964) is a British-American playwright, author and journalist.

== Early life and family ==
Eugenia Citkowitz was born in 1964 in the state of New York, the youngest of two daughters to Israel Citkowitz, an American pianist, composer and piano teacher, and Lady Caroline Blackwood, an English writer. Citkowitz grew up in London; about her childhood, she said [she had a] "chaotic home life, lonely at times, although I met many interesting people." Her parents divorced in 1972, although her father continued to live nearby and helped raise her and her sisters until his death. Citkowitz has four half-siblings. Her stepfather was Robert Lowell, an American poet.

Citkowitz attended a boarding school in Devon. During her teenage years, she attended St Paul's Girls' School in Hammersmith. Citkowitz graduated with a degree in English literature from Oxford University. She was educated, briefly, in the United States.

=== Family ===
Through her mother, Citkowitz is a member of the Guinness family, a prominent Irish and British family in brewing, banking and politics. Citkowitz is an heiress to the Guinness beer fortune.

Citkowitz's maternal grandparents were Maureen Constance Guinness, an Anglo-Irish socialite, and the 4th Marquess of Dufferin and Ava, an English-born Anglo-Irish politician. Her uncle and aunt were the 5th Marquess of Dufferin and Ava, an Anglo-Irish noble, and Lindy, Marchioness of Dufferin and Ava, an English conservationist, and Citkowitz's fifth cousin.

== Career ==
Citkowitz's first book Ether was published in 2010, a collection of seven short stories and a novella. Ether was picked as The New York Times Editors' Choice and included in The New Yorker's Book Club.

Citkowitz's debut novel The Shades, a psychological thriller, was published on 19 June 2018. The Shades covers the impact of a daughter's death on a family as they try to move on with their grief. Citkowitz stated that the purpose of the novel was to look into the "fragility of human existence" and the original story grew from the idea of "someone returning to their childhood home" that she then expanded upon. One of her primary focuses was to create characters that felt "authentic as people" in order to form empathy in the reader and also why she researched the intricacies of the fields and hobbies each of the characters practice in the novel, such as pottery.

Citkowitz has written for various publications in the United Kingdom and the United States, including The Sunday Times, The London Magazine, The Guardian, The New York Times and Harper's Bazaar.

=== Published works ===
- Citkowitz, Evgenia (2010). Ether. Farrar, Straus and Giroux. ISBN 978-0-374-29887-6.
- Citkowitz, Evgenia (2018). The Shades. W. W. Norton & Company. ISBN 978-0-393-25412-9.

=== Accolades ===
Citkowitz has previously been longlisted for The Sunday Times EFG Private Bank Short Story Award, and was one of the winners of The Word Factory's Neil Gaiman, Fables for a Modern World story competition.

== Personal life ==
Citkowitz keeps her personal life mostly private. On 22 September 1990, Citkowitz married Julian Sands, after being introduced to him by John Malkovich. Sands disappeared in January 2023 during a hiking trip, and his remains were found in June 2023. The couple had two daughters, and Citkowitz is stepmother to a son from Sands' first marriage. Since 1990, she and her family have resided in Los Angeles, California.
