= Ernest Guinness =

Anglo-Irish engineer; member of the Guinness family

The Honourable Ernest Guinness
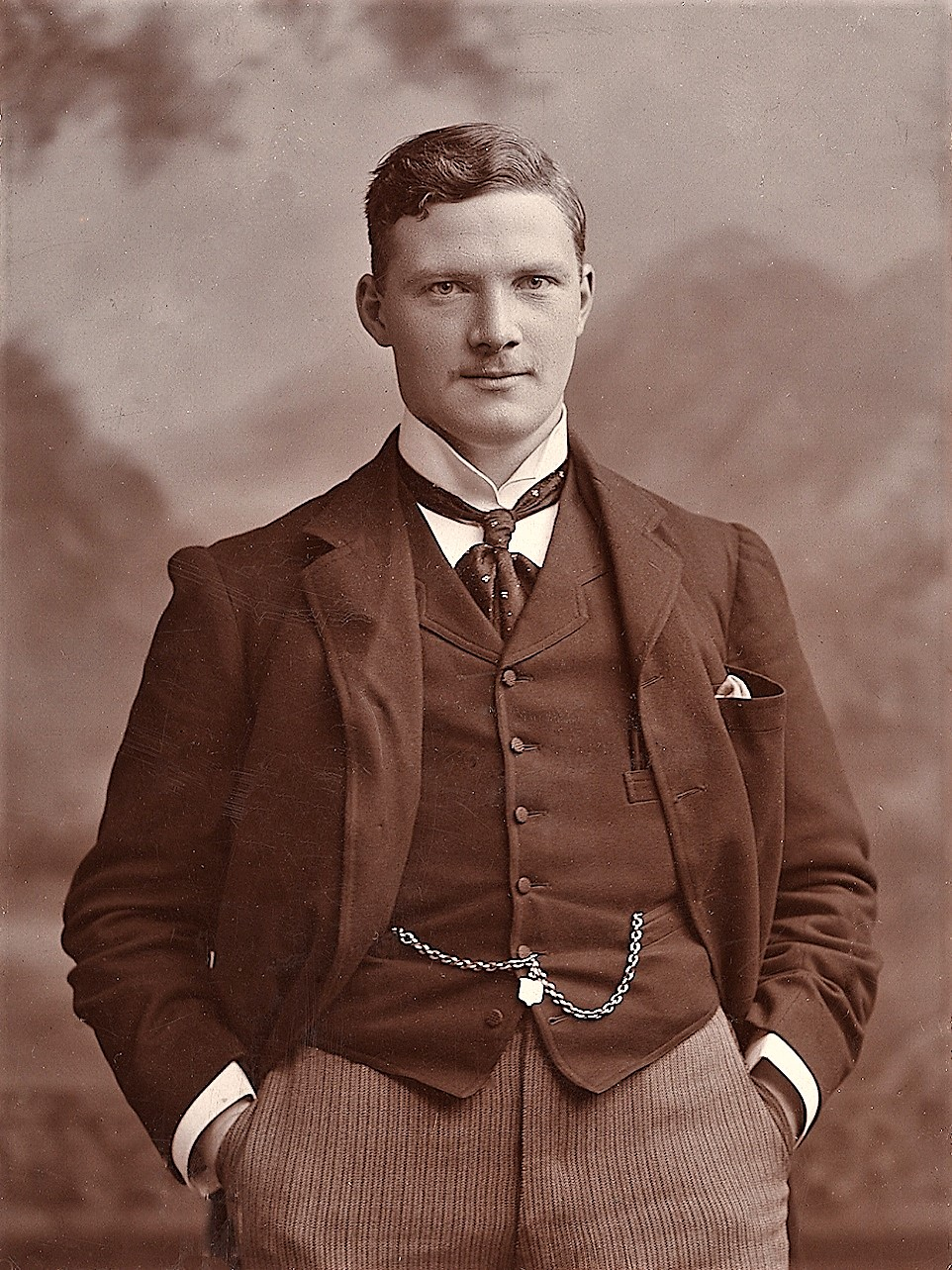
- Born: Arthur Ernest Guinness; 2 November 1876; Dublin, Ireland
- Died: 22 March 1949 (aged 72); Dublin, Ireland
- Spouse: Marie Clothilde Russell
- Children: Aileen; Maureen; Oonagh
- Parents: Edward Guinness, 1st Earl of Iveagh (father); Adelaide Maria Guinness (mother)

Arthur Ernest Guinness JP DL (2 November 1876 – 22 March 1949) was an Anglo-Irish engineer and a senior member of the Guinness family.

== Family ==
Portrait of Marie Clothilde Guinness by Frank Dicksee, 1912

Guinness was the second son of brewing magnate Edward Guinness, 1st Earl of Iveagh and Adelaide Guinness. On 15 July 1903 he married Marie Clothilde Russell, the daughter of Sir George Russell, 4th Baronet, and his wife Charlotte. Ernest and Marie Clothilde had:

- Aileen (1904–1999), who married the Hon. Brinsley Plunket;
- Maureen (1907–1998), the wife of Basil Hamilton-Temple-Blackwood, 4th Marquess of Dufferin and Ava, whose children included the author Caroline Blackwood;
- Oonagh (1910–1995), the wife of the Hon. Philip Kindersley, and then of Dominick Browne, 4th Baron Oranmore and Browne, whose children included Garech Browne and Tara Browne.

== Career ==
Guinness was seen as the modernising technical expert among the Guinness family directors at Guinness from 1900 to the 1930s, until he was seriously injured in a motorboat accident at sea in Killary lough. A keen motorist, he bought a custom-built V16 Cadillac, from Mayfair dealer Lendrum & Hartman Limited which was exhibited at 1930 London Motor Show. In 1934 he was involved in building a new brewery at Park Royal in the suburbs of London. In 1923 he bought the "Fantome II", a 3-masted barque.

He was educated at Eton College before going up to Trinity College, Cambridge, where he gained his MA. He served as a Lieutenant with the London Rifle Brigade and fought during World War I. He was a Deputy Lieutenant and a Justice of the peace for County Dublin.
