= Elmer Bernstein =

American composer and conductor (1922–2004)

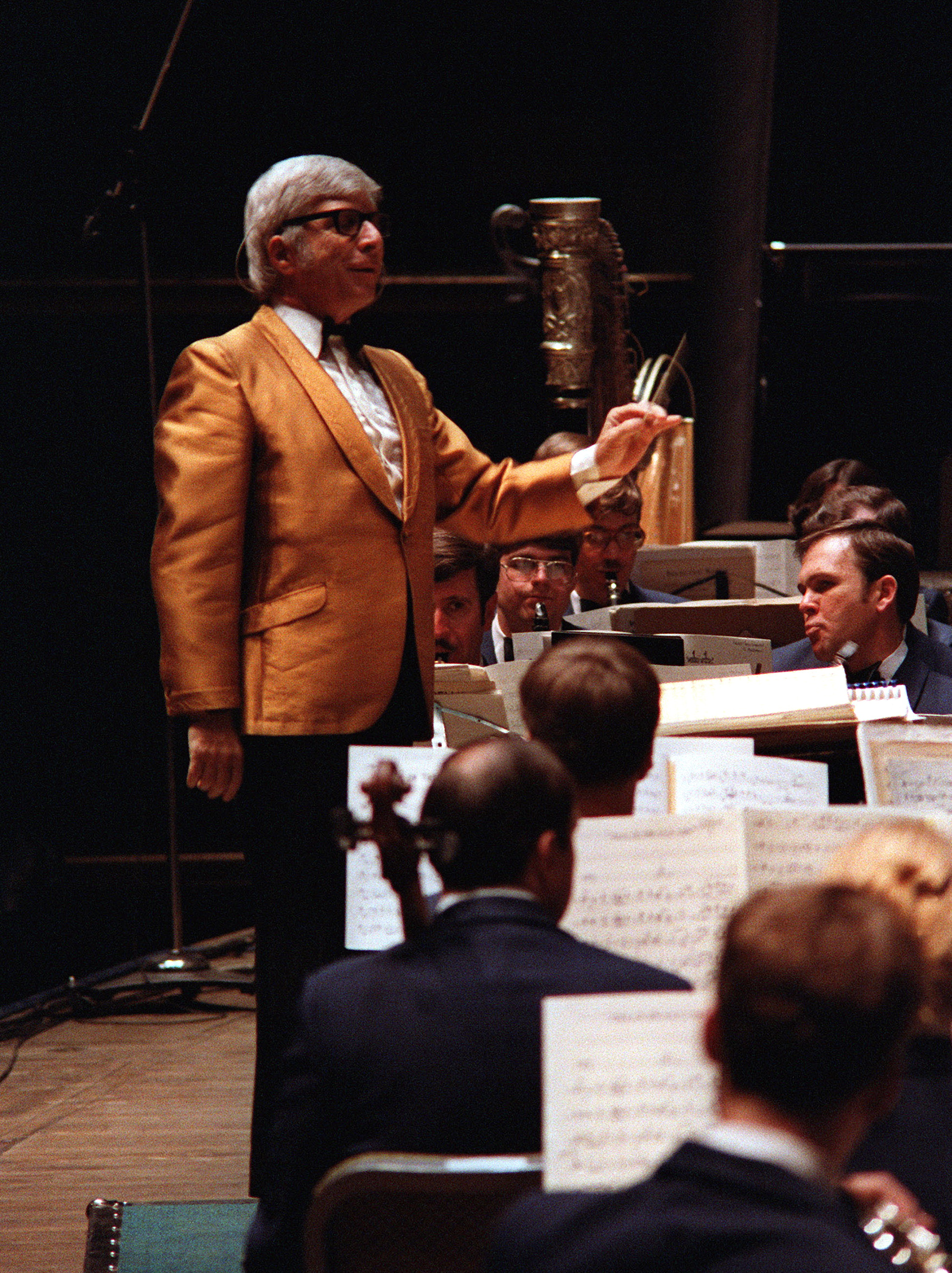
- Bernstein guest conducting the U.S. Air Force Band in 1981

Background information
- Born: April 4, 1922; New York City, United States
- Died: August 18, 2004 (aged 82) Ojai, California, United States
- Genres: Film scores, crime jazz
- Occupations: Composer; conductor; songwriter
- Instrument: Keyboards
- Years active: 1951–2004
- Spouses: Rhoda Federgreen (m. 1942; div. 1945); Pearl Glusman (m. 1946; div. 1965); Eve Adamson (m. 1965)

Elmer Bernstein (/ˈbɜːrnstiːn/ BURN-steen; April 4, 1922 – August 18, 2004) was an American composer and conductor. In a career that spanned over five decades, he composed "some of the most recognizable and memorable themes in Hollywood history", including over 150 original film scores, as well as scores for nearly 80 television productions. For his work, he received an Academy Award for Thoroughly Modern Millie (1967) and a Primetime Emmy Award. He also received seven Golden Globe Awards, five Grammy Awards, and two Tony Award nominations.

Bernstein composed and arranged over 100 film scores, including Sudden Fear (1952), The Man with the Golden Arm (1955), The Ten Commandments (1956), Sweet Smell of Success (1957), The Magnificent Seven (1960), To Kill a Mockingbird (1962), The World of Henry Orient (1964), The Great Escape (1963), Hud (1963), Thoroughly Modern Millie (1967), True Grit (1969), My Left Foot (1989), The Grifters (1990), Cape Fear (1991), Twilight (1998), and Far from Heaven (2002). He is known for his work on the comedic films Animal House (1978), Meatballs (1979), Airplane! (1980), The Blues Brothers (1980), Stripes (1981), Heavy Metal (1981), Trading Places (1983), Ghostbusters (1984), Spies Like Us (1985), The Black Cauldron (1985) and Three Amigos (1986).

He also worked on frequent collaborations with directors Martin Scorsese, Robert Mulligan, John Landis, Ivan Reitman, John Sturges, Bill Duke, George Roy Hill, Richard Fleischer, John Frankenheimer, and Henry Hathaway.

In 1985, Bernstein composed the dark, orchestral score for Disney's animated feature The Black Cauldron. Utilizing the eerie electronic tones of the ondes Martenot, with no songs, his work marked a distinct musical shift for Disney animation, though a significant amount of his music was cut out due to last-minute revisions.

== Early life ==
Bernstein was born to a Jewish family in New York City, the son of Selma (née Feinstein, 1901–1991), from Ukraine, and Edward Bernstein (1896–1968), from Austria-Hungary.

He was not related to fellow composer and conductor Leonard Bernstein, though they were friends. Within the world of professional music, they were distinguished from each other by the use of the nicknames Bernstein West (Elmer) and Bernstein East (Leonard), based on their bases of operation: East for New York City, West for Hollywood and Los Angeles. They also pronounced their surnames differently; Elmer pronounced his name "BERN-steen", and Leonard used "BERN-styne".

During his childhood, Bernstein performed professionally as a dancer and an actor, in the latter case playing the part of Caliban in The Tempest on Broadway, and he also won several prizes for his painting. He attended Manhattan's progressive Walden School and gravitated toward music. At the age of 12 he was awarded a piano scholarship by Henriette Michelson, a Juilliard teacher who guided him throughout his entire career as a pianist. She took him to play some of his improvisations for composer Aaron Copland, who was encouraging and selected Israel Citkowitz as a teacher for the young boy.

Bernstein was drafted into the United States Army Air Forces during the World War II era where he wrote music for the Armed Forces Radio.

Elmer Bernstein's music has some stylistic similarities to Copland's music, most notably in his western scores, particularly sections of Big Jake, in the Gregory Peck film Amazing Grace and Chuck, and in his spirited score for the 1958 film adaptation of Erskine Caldwell's novel God's Little Acre.

He had a lifelong enthusiasm for an even wider spectrum of the arts than his childhood interests would imply and, in 1959, when he was scoring The Story on Page One, he considered becoming a novelist and asked the film's screenwriter, Clifford Odets, to give him lessons in writing fiction.

== Scoring career ==
=== Early 1950s: Hollywood blacklist ===
External audio
- You may hear Elmer Bernstein's Theme Song for the movie The Magnificent Seven performed in 1960 Here on archive.org

Bernstein's first film scores were at Columbia Pictures for director David Miller, notably 1952's film noir thriller Sudden Fear, which was nominated for several Academy Awards. However, his career quickly faced a setback that same year when, along with many other artists in Hollywood, Bernstein faced censure during the McCarthy era. Bernstein was called by the House Un-American Activities Committee when it was discovered that he had written some music reviews for a Communist newspaper. He later said in a 2002 interview, "I’d been involved in so-called left-wing activities. During the war we were allies with the Soviet Union and I’d done benefit concerts and such things for Friends of the Soviet Union. That was enough. It was a paranoid era and pretty terrifying."

After he refused to name names, pointing out that he had never attended a Communist Party meeting, Bernstein was "greylisted". He found work scoring low-budget B movies like Robot Monster and Cat-Women of the Moon (both 1953), both of which were produced independently by Al Zimbalist. His score for Robot Monster, which gained a cult following as one of the worst films ever made, gained some notoriety among cult movie fans. During this period, he also worked as a session musician in studio music departments, notably as the rehearsal pianist for Oklahoma! (1955).

His most high-profile score during his greylist period was for the addiction-themed drama The Man with the Golden Arm (premiered 1955, but not released widely until 1956), directed by Otto Preminger and starring Frank Sinatra. The jazz-inflected score earned him the first of 14 Academy Award nominations.

=== Late 1950s-1960s: Breakthrough ===
Bernstein was hired by Cecil B. DeMille to score his 1956 Biblical epic The Ten Commandments. He was originally hired only to write and record diegetic music for the film's dance sequences and other onscreen musical passages, but was promoted after DeMille's regular composer Victor Young declined due to failing health. In total, Bernstein wrote 2½ hours of music for the film, which proved a massive hit and cemented his status as a top score composer.

Bernstein wrote the theme songs or other music for more than 200 films and TV shows, including The Magnificent Seven, The Great Escape, The Ten Commandments (1956), Johnny Staccato (1959 TV theme and Capitol Records album) received little attention in the US but the single went to number four in Britain, True Grit, The Man with the Golden Arm, To Kill a Mockingbird, Robot Monster, Ghostbusters, Baby the Rain Must Fall (1965), and the fanfare used in the National Geographic television specials.

His theme for The Magnificent Seven is also familiar to television viewers, as it was used in commercials for Marlboro cigarettes. Bernstein also provided the score to many of the short films of Ray and Charles Eames.

In 1961 Bernstein co-founded Äva Records, an American record label based in Los Angeles together with Fred Astaire, Jackie Mills and Tommy Wolf.

=== Broadway ===
In addition to his film music, Bernstein wrote the scores for two Broadway musicals, How Now, Dow Jones, with lyricist Carolyn Leigh, in 1967 and Merlin, with lyricist Don Black, in 1983.

One of Bernstein's tunes has since gained a lasting place in U.S. college sports culture: in 1968, University of South Carolina football head coach Paul Dietzel wrote new lyrics to "Step to the Rear", from How Now, Dow Jones. The South Carolina version of the tune, "The Fighting Gamecocks Lead the Way", has been the school's fight song ever since.

=== 1980s: Comedic works ===
John Landis grew up near Bernstein, and befriended him through his children. Years later, he requested that Bernstein compose the music for National Lampoon's Animal House, over the studio's objections. He explained to Bernstein that he thought that Bernstein's score, playing it straight as if the comedic Delta frat characters were actual heroes, would emphasize the comedy further.

The opening theme of the film is based upon a slight inversion of a secondary theme from Brahms's Academic Festival Overture. Bernstein accepted the job, and it sparked a second wave in his career, where he continued to compose music for high-profile comedies such as Ghostbusters, Stripes, Airplane! and The Blues Brothers, as well as most of Landis's films for the next 15 years, including An American Werewolf in London, Trading Places, and the music video to the Michael Jackson song "Thriller".

=== 1990s: Continued work ===
External audio
- You may hear Elmer Bernstein's music for the movie The Age of Innocence performed by the London Philharmonic in 1993 Here on archive.org

When Martin Scorsese announced that he was re-making Cape Fear, Bernstein adapted Bernard Herrmann's original score to the new film. Bernstein leapt at the opportunity to work with Scorsese, as well as to pay homage to Herrmann. Scorsese and Bernstein subsequently worked together on two more films, The Age of Innocence (1993) and Bringing Out the Dead (1999). Bernstein had previously conducted Herrmann's original unused score for Alfred Hitchcock's 1966 Torn Curtain.

== Classical ==
Having studied composition under Aaron Copland, Roger Sessions, and Stefan Wolpe, Bernstein also performed as a concert pianist between 1939 and 1950 and wrote numerous classical compositions, including three orchestral suites, two song cycles, various compositions for viola and piano and for solo piano, and a string quartet.

As president of the Young Musicians Foundation, Bernstein became acquainted with classical guitarist Christopher Parkening and wrote a Concerto for Guitar and Orchestra, which Parkening recorded with the London Symphony Orchestra under Bernstein's baton for the Angel label in 1999. In addition, Bernstein was a professor at the University of Southern California's Thornton School of Music and conductor of the San Fernando Valley Symphony in the early 1970s.

== Personal life and death ==
Bernstein was married three times, first to Rhoda Federgreen. Their marriage lasted from 1942 to 1946. Bernstein's second wife was Pearl Glusman, whom he wed in Philadelphia, Pennsylvania, on December 21, 1946. After the couple's divorce in 1965, Bernstein married Eve Adamson. They remained together for 39 years, until his death.

In the 1960s, Bernstein was an owner in the Triad Stable Thoroughbred racing partnership, named for a music term. His partners included his assistant, Robert Helfer, and the wife of the Triad Stable's trainer Morton Lipton.

The Bernsteins in the 1990s resided in Hope Ranch, a suburb of Santa Barbara, California. Later, they moved to a home in Ojai, California, where Bernstein died of cancer on August 18, 2004. His publicist Cathy Mouton simply stated at the time that Bernstein had died following a lengthy illness. He was survived by his wife Eve and their two daughters, Emilie and Elizabeth; by his two sons, Peter and Gregory Bernstein, from his earlier marriage to Pearl Glusman; and by five grandchildren.

== Influences and legacy ==
Bernstein considered these artists as influences on his work: Benny Goodman, Count Basie, Dimitri Tiomkin, Duke Ellington, Erich Wolfgang Korngold, Franz Waxman, Miklós Rózsa, Jimmie Lunceford, Max Steiner, Victor Young, Aaron Copland, Bernard Herrmann, Nino Rota, Roger Sessions, Stefan Wolpe.

Composers who have acknowledged the influence of Bernstein's work on their own include James Newton Howard, Alan Silvestri, Georges Delerue, Howard Shore, John Barry, Lalo Schifrin, Dick Hyman, Hans Zimmer, James Horner, Jerry Goldsmith, John Williams, Trevor Jones, Mark Isham, Bear McCreary (who was mentored by Bernstein), Ennio Morricone, Danny Elfman, Alan Menken, Randy Newman, and Randy Edelman.

== Discography ==
=== Albums ===
- Walk On the Wild Side, 1962, No. 33 US
- The Carpetbaggers, 1964, No. 141 US

== Awards and nominations ==
Over the course of his career, Bernstein won an Academy Award, an Emmy Award, and two Golden Globe Awards. In addition, he was nominated for the Tony Award three times and a Grammy Award five times. He received 14 Academy Award nominations and was nominated at least once per decade from the 1950s until the 2000s, but his only win was for Thoroughly Modern Millie for Best Original Music Score. Bernstein was recognized by the Hollywood Foreign Press Association with Golden Globes for his scores for To Kill a Mockingbird and Hawaii. In 1963, he won the Primetime Emmy Award for his score of The Making of The President 1960. He is the recipient of Western Heritage Awards for The Magnificent Seven (1960) and The Hallelujah Trail (1965).

Additional honors included lifetime achievement awards from the Academy of Motion Picture Arts and Sciences, American Society of Composers, Authors and Publishers (ASCAP), the Society for the Preservation of Film Music, the US, Woodstock, Santa Barbara, Newport Beach and Flanders International Film Festivals and the Foundation for a Creative America. In 1996, Bernstein was honored with a star on Hollywood Boulevard. In 1999, he received an honorary Doctorate of Music from Five Towns College in New York and was honored by the American Film Institute in Los Angeles. Bernstein again was honored by ASCAP with its marquee Founders Award in 2001 and with the NARAS Governors Award in June 2004. Bernstein was the subject of This Is Your Life in 2003 when he was surprised by Michael Aspel at London's Royal Albert Hall, after conducting the Royal Philharmonic Orchestra as part of his 80th year celebrations.

His scores for The Magnificent Seven and To Kill a Mockingbird were ranked by the American Film Institute as the eighth and seventeenth greatest American film scores of all time, respectively, on the list of AFI's 100 Years of Film Scores. Bernstein, Bernard Herrmann, Max Steiner, and Jerry Goldsmith are the only composers to have two scores listed, and are therefore in second place for the most scores on the list, behind John Williams, who has three. Other Bernstein film scores nominated for the list are as follows: The Age of Innocence (1993), Far from Heaven (2002), The Great Escape (1963), Hawaii (1966), The Man with the Golden Arm (1955), Summer and Smoke (1961), Sweet Smell of Success (1957), The Ten Commandments (1956), and Walk on the Wild Side (1962).
