= Julian Sands =

British actor (1958–2023)

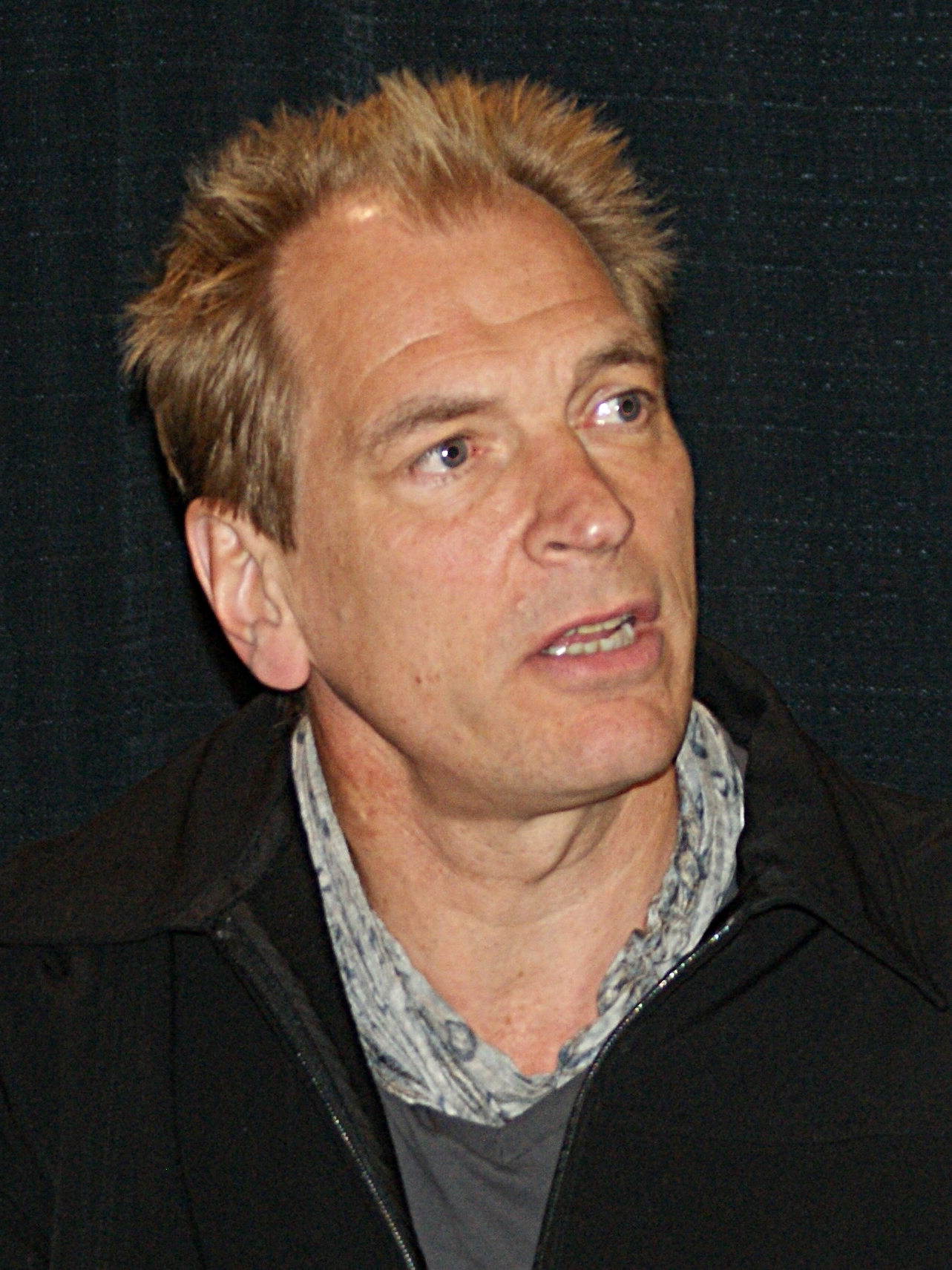
- Sands in 2011
- Born: 4 January 1958; Otley, England
- Died: c. 13 January 2023 (aged 65); San Gabriel Mountains, U.S.
- Body discovered: 24 June 2023
- Occupation: Actor
- Years active: 1982–2023
- Spouses: Sarah Harvey (m. 1984; div. 1987) Evgenia Citkowitz (m. 1990)
- Children: 3
- Relatives: Israel Citkowitz (father-in-law); Lady Caroline Blackwood (mother-in-law)

Julian Richard Morley Sands (4 January 1958 – c. 13 January 2023) was an English actor. He had co-starring roles in Oxford Blues and The Killing Fields in 1984. The following year, Sands played George Emerson in A Room with a View; this became his breakout role. He then went on to appear in Gothic (1986); Warlock (1989); Arachnophobia (1990); Naked Lunch (1991); Leaving Las Vegas (1995); and The Girl with the Dragon Tattoo (2011). His television roles included Nick Hardaway in Rose Red (2002), Vladimir Bierko in 24 (2006) and Jor-El in Smallville (2009–2010); he also voiced the character of Valmont in Jackie Chan Adventures (2000–2002).

In January 2023, Sands went missing while hiking in the San Gabriel Mountains. Several unsuccessful searches for him were undertaken. Five months later, his remains were discovered in the area he had been visiting.

== Early life ==
Julian Richard Morley Sands was born in Otley on 4 January 1958. He was the son of Conservative Party councillor Brenda (née Leach) and soil analyst William Sands. Brenda Sands was a leading figure in the local amateur dramatic society. Sands was educated at Lord Wandsworth College in Long Sutton, Hampshire and at London's Central School of Speech and Drama.

== Career ==
Sands appeared in small roles in Oxford Blues (1984) and The Killing Fields (1984). He also had a cameo as a Greek soldier in the BBC adaptation of The Box of Delights in 1984. Sands appeared in After Darkness in 1985.

Sands played the romantic lead role of George Emerson in the 1985 film A Room with a View. This role became his breakout role. Following the success of A Room with a View and Ken Russell's Gothic (1986), Sands abandoned the lead role he had signed on to play in Maurice and moved to Hollywood to pursue a career in American films.

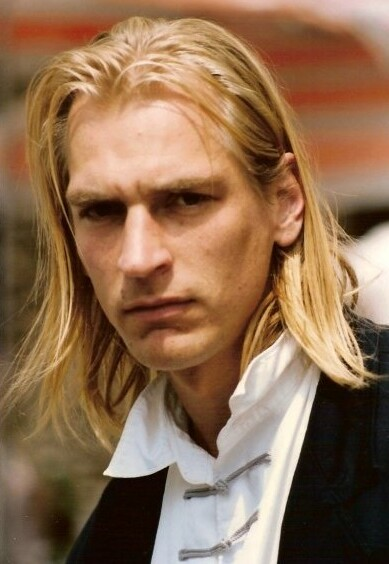
Sands at the 1990 Cannes Film Festival

Sands played the title role in the horror film Warlock (1989) and its sequel Warlock: The Armageddon (1993), the role of Franz Liszt in Impromptu (1991), and the role of Yves Cloquet in Naked Lunch (1991). He also played prominent roles in Arachnophobia (1990), Boxing Helena (1993), Tale of a Vampire (1992), and Leaving Las Vegas (1995). Sands played the lead role of Erik in the 1998 horror-film version of The Phantom of the Opera. He played Laurence Olivier in BBC Four's In Praise of Hardcore (2005), a drama about the critic and impresario Kenneth Tynan.

In television work, he voiced Valmont in seasons 1 and 2 of Jackie Chan Adventures, before being replaced by Andrew Ableson and Greg Ellis in the remaining seasons. He played the Doci of the Ori in two episodes of the ninth season of Stargate SG-1 (a role he reprised in the film, Stargate: the Ark of Truth). He played a college professor in a Season One episode of The L Word. In 2002, he starred in Stephen King's Rose Red and the Austrian ambassador Klemens von Metternich in the miniseries Napoléon. In the 2006 season of 24, he played terrorist Vladimir Bierko.

Sands played Jor-El, Superman's father, in the ninth season of Smallville, and reprised the role in the series' final (tenth) season. In 2009, he played Reg Hunt in Bollywood Hero. In 2012, he played Alistair Wesley in the seventh episode of the second season of Person of Interest.

In August 2011, he appeared onstage at the Edinburgh Fringe Festival in A Celebration of Harold Pinter, directed by John Malkovich at the Pleasance Courtyard. The play transferred to the Irish Repertory Theatre in New York. His performance in the play was nominated for "Outstanding Solo Performance" for the 58th Annual Drama Desk Awards (2013).

In 2011, Sands appeared in the mystery thriller film The Girl with the Dragon Tattoo, an English-language remake of the original version, as the younger Henrik Vanger. In 2012, Sands voiced the character of DeFalco in Call of Duty: Black Ops 2. In 2013, Sands appeared as Miles Castner, a wealthy international businessman, during the eighth season of Dexter.

== Personal life ==
Sands was married to Sarah Harvey, a British journalist and author, from 1984 until 1987. The couple had one son. On 22 September 1990, Sands married Evgenia Citkowitz – an American playwright, author, and journalist who is the daughter of Polish-American composer Israel Citkowitz and Lady Caroline Blackwood – after being introduced by John Malkovich, a friend of Sands. The couple had two daughters. Sands was fiercely protective of his family and rarely spoke about his wife or children in interviews.

Sands and his family lived in Los Angeles in the United States from 1990 until his death.

== Disappearance and death ==
On 13 January 2023, Sands, a dedicated mountaineer, went hiking at Mount San Antonio, California in the San Gabriel Mountains northeast of Los Angeles. He was reported missing later that evening. An initial search for Sands was hampered by severe storms that occurred shortly after he went missing. His car was located on 18 January. The following day, it was reported that Sands's three adult children had joined the ground search for their father. His son Henry, along with an experienced climber, retraced the route his father was believed to have taken. Sands was believed to be traversing the Baldy Bowl Trail, "which climbs 3,900 feet (1,200 m) over 4.5 miles (7.2 km) to the highest summit in the San Gabriel Mountains". Reports state there was "evidence of avalanches" in the region. On the 11th day after Sands went missing, the Sands family released a statement praising "the heroic search teams" and their efforts "on the ground and in the air to bring Julian home".

The SBSD stated on 19 June that two days earlier, more than 80 search and rescue volunteers had descended into remote areas across Mount Baldy to search for Sands. The SBSD added that since January, there had been eight official search missions to find Sands; more than 500 volunteer search hours were spent on those search missions. On 23 June, the Sands family released a statement saying, "We continue to hold Julian in our hearts with bright memories of him as a wonderful father, husband, explorer, lover of the natural world and the arts and as an original and collaborative performer."

Sands' body was found by hikers on 24 June. On 24 July, the cause of death was listed as "undetermined" due to "the condition of the body ... [which is] common when dealing with cases of this type."

== Filmography ==
=== Film ===
Year	Title	Role	Notes	Ref.
1983	Privates on Parade	Sailor		
1984	Oxford Blues	Colin Gilchrist Fisher		
1984	The Killing Fields	Jon Swain		
1985	After Darkness	Laurence Hunninger		
1985	The Doctor and the Devils	Dr. Murray		
1985	A Room with a View	George Emerson		
1986	Gothic	Percy Bysshe Shelley		
1987	Siesta	Kit		
1988	Vibes	Dr. Harrison Steele		
1988	Wherever You Are...	Julian Castor		
1989	Warlock	Warlock		
1989	Tennessee Nights	Wolfgang Leighton		
1989	Manika, une vie plus tard	Daniel Mahoney		
1990	Arachnophobia	Dr. James Atherton		
1990	The Sun Also Shines at Night	Sergio Giuramondo		
1991	Impromptu	Franz Liszt		
1991	The Wicked	Gustav		
1991	Grand Isle	Alcee Arobin		
1991	Husband and Lovers	Stefan		
1991	Naked Lunch	Yves Cloquet		
1992	Tale of a Vampire	Alex		
1992	The Turn of the Screw	Mr. Cooper		
1993	Boxing Helena	Dr. Nick Cavanaugh		
1993	Warlock: The Armageddon	Warlock		
1994	The Browning Version	Tom Gilbert		
1994	Mario and the Magician	Professor Fuhrmann		
1995	Leaving Las Vegas	Yuri Butso		
1995	America			
1996	Never Ever	Roderick		
1997	One Night Stand	Nurse Chris		
1998	The Phantom of the Opera	Erik, The Phantom of the Opera		
1998	Long Time Since	Michael James		
1999	The Loss of Sexual Innocence	Adult Nic		
2000	Mercy	Dr. Dominick Broussard		
2000	Timecode	Quentin		
2000	Vatel	Louis XIV		
2000	The Million Dollar Hotel	Terence Scopey		
2000	Love Me	The sailor		
2001	Hotel	Tour Guide		
2002	The Scoundrel's Wife	Dr. Lenz		
2003	The Medallion	AJ "Snakehead" Staul		
2003	Easy Six	Packard Schmidt		
2004	Romasanta	Manuel Blanco Romasanta		
2005	Her Name Is Carla	Bill		
2006	La piste	Gary		
2007	Ocean's Thirteen	Greco Montgomery		
2008	Stargate: The Ark of Truth	Doci		
2008	Cat City	Nick Compton		
2008	Heidi 4 Paws	Peter the Goatherder	Voice	
2008	Demetra's Dream	Photoreporter	Short	
2009	Blood and Bone	Franklin McVeigh		
2009	Second Chance	Principal	Short	
2010	Golf in the Kingdom	Peter McNaughton		
2010	The Good Life	Robert	Short	
2010	Assisting Venus	Dominic		
2011	The Girl with the Dragon Tattoo	Young Henrik Vanger		
2011	The Maiden and the Princess	Bernard	Short	
2012	Hirokin	Viceroy Griffin		
2012	Suspension of Disbelief	DCI Hackett		
2012	Il turno di notte lo fanno le stelle	Mark	Short	
2013	All Things to All Men	Cutter		
2013	The Last Impresario	Himself – Interviewee		
2014	Cesar Chavez	Victore Representative		
2014	Jetty	Himself	Short	
2014	Six Dance Lessons in Six Weeks	Winslow Cunard		
2014	GHB: To Be or Not to Be	Le client		
2014	Me	Sam Citkowitz		
2015	Extraordinary Tales	Narrator	Voice, segment: "The Facts in the Case of M. Valdemar"	
2015	A Postcard from Istanbul	Julian	Short	
2015	Sariel	God	Short	
2016	The Persian Connection	Evgeny		
2016	The Chosen	Kotov		
2016	Honey Flood	CD McKee	Short	
2016	Surfing	Advertiser	Voice, short	
2017	Crooked House	Philip Leonides		
2017	The Escape	Lambert	Short	
2017	Borley Rectory	Narrator		
2018	Walk Like a Panther	Tony 'Sweet Cheeks' Smith		
2018	The Keeper	Fred Tilson		
2018	Toy Gun	Detective Antony Jonta		
2019	The Garden of Evening Mists	Older Frederik Gemmell		
2019	The Painted Bird	Garbos		
2020	Yeh Ballet	Saul Aaron		
2020	Death Rider in the House of Vampires	Count Holiday		
2020	Bobbleheads: The Movie	Purrbles	Voice, direct-to-video	
2021	Benediction	Chief Medical Officer		
2021	The Survivalist	Heath Grant	Direct-to-video	
2021	The Ghosts of Borley Rectory	Lionel Foyster		
2022	The Ghosts of Monday	Bruce		
2023	Seneca – On the Creation of Earthquakes	Rufus	Posthumous release	
2023	Double Soul	Orlandi	Posthumous release	
2023	The Piper	Gustafson	Posthumous release	
2023	Body Odyssey	Kurt	Posthumous release	
2024	The Last Breath	Levi	Posthumous release; final film role	

=== Television ===
Year	Title	Role	Notes	Ref.
1982	Play for Today	Groom	Episode: "Soft Targets"	
1983	A Married Man	Guy Lough	3 episodes	
1984	The Box of Delights	Greek Soldier	Episode: "Beware of Yesterday"	
1984	The Sun Also Rises	Gerald	Episode #1.3	
1985	Romance on the Orient Express	Sandy	Television film	
1985	The Holy Experiment	Captain Arago	Television film	
1986	Harem	Charles Forest	Television film	
1987	Basements	Mr. Sands	Segment: "The Room"	
1989	Murder by Moonlight	Maj. Gregorivitj Kirilenko	Television film	
1992	Crazy in Love	Mark Constable	Television film	
1994	Witch Hunt	Finn Macha	Television film	
1995	End of Summer	Reverend Basil March	Television film	
1995	The Great Elephant Escape	Clive Potter	Television film	
1995	Biker Mice from Mars	Sir Lancelot	Voice, 2 episodes	
1996	Adventures from the Book of Virtues	Henry	Voice, episode: "Responsibility"	
1996	The Tomorrow Man	Ken	Television film	
1996	The Real Adventures of Jonny Quest	Kreed	Voice, episode: "Race Against Danger"	
1996	Chicago Hope	Bradford Whittle	Episode: "Mummy Dearest"	
2000–2002	Jackie Chan Adventures	Valmont	Voice, 26 episodes	
2002	Rose Red	Nick Hardaway	3 episodes	
2002	Napoleon	Klemens von Metternich	Episode: "1812-1821"	
2002	Ozzy and Drix	Penicillin G	Voice, episode: "Strepfinger"	
2004	Dark Kingdom: The Dragon King	Hagen	Television film	
2004	The L Word	Nick	Episode: "Lies, Lies, Lies"	
2005	Law & Order: Special Victims Unit	Barclay Pallister	Episode: "Design"	
2005	Stargate SG-1	Doci	2 episodes	
2005	Kenneth Tynan: In Praise of Hardcore	Laurence Olivier	Television film	
2006	Law & Order: Criminal Intent	Philip Reinhardt	Episode: "Dramma Giocoso"	
2006	24	Vladimir Bierko	11 episodes	
2006	The Haunted Airman	Dr. Hal Burns	Television film	
2007	Agatha Christie's Marple	Thomas Royde	Episode: "Towards Zero"	
2007	Blood Ties	Javier Mendoza	2 episodes	
2007	Ghost Whisperer	Ethan Clark	2 episodes	
2008	Lipstick Jungle	Hector Matrick	5 episodes	
2009	Bollywood Hero	Reg Hunt	3 episodes	
2009	Beyond Sherwood Forest	Malcolm	Television film	
2009–2010	Smallville	Jor-El	2 episodes	
2010	Castle	Teddy Farrow	Episode: "Inventing the Girl"	
2011	Above Suspicion	Damian Nolan	2 episodes	
2011	NTSF:SD:SUV::	Doctor	Episode: "I Left My Heart in Someone's Cooler"	
2012	Person of Interest	Alistair Wesley	Episode: "Critical"	
2013	Dexter	Miles Castner	Episode: "Dress Code"	
2014	Banshee	Yulish Rabitov	3 episodes	
2014	Banshee Origins	Yulish Rabitov	2 episodes	
2014	Crossbones	William Jagger	8 episodes	
2014	The Village	Lord Kilmartin	2 episodes	
2014	Unknown Heart	Richard Mellor	Television film	
2014	Crónica de Castas	Anthony	Episode: "El hijo de la chingada"	
2015	Gotham	Dr. Gerald Crane	2 episodes	
2015	We're Doomed! The Dad's Army Story	John Le Mesurier	Television film	
2017	Man in an Orange Shirt	Caspar Nicholson	Episode #1.2	
2017	Will	Barrett Emerson	4 episodes	
2018	Medici: The Magnificent	Piero di Cosimo de' Medici	2 episodes	
2018	The Blacklist	Sutton Ross	2 episodes	
2018	Elementary	Jasper Wells	Episode: "The Adventure of the Ersatz Sobekneferu"	
2019	What/If	Liam Strom	4 episodes	
2019	Into the Dark	Steven	Episode: "A Nasty Piece of Work"	

=== Video games ===
Year	Title	Voice role	Ref.
2012	Call of Duty: Black Ops II	DeFalco	

== See also ==
- List of solved missing person cases (2020s)
- List of unsolved deaths
