= Suki Potier =

English model (1947–1981)

- Born: Melanie Susan Potier; 14 November 1947; Surrey, England
- Died: 23 June 1981 (aged 33); Portugal
- Occupation: Model
- Spouse: Robert Ho

Melanie Susan Potier (14 November 1947 – 23 June 1981), better known as Suki Potier, was an English model.

== Early life ==
Melanie Susan Potier was born on 14 November 1947 in Surrey, England. Her father was Gilbert Potier, and her mother was Mary (nee Moore) Potier. Potier had one sibling, Sarah Sally Rosemary Potier (born 12 February 1946).

== Modelling ==
As a teenager, Potier was a model for many English designers and agencies, including English Boy, an agency on the King's Road in Chelsea, London, England. In 1967, she modelled for Ossie Clark's April 1967 collection.

Potier had a small acting role in the 1968 psychedelic film Wonderwall, and archive footage of her was also used in a 2011 music documentary George Harrison: Living in the Material World.

== Personal life ==
In 1966, Potier was dating Tara Browne, an heir to the Guinness fortune. On 18 December 1966, aged 19, Potier was a passenger in his turquoise Lotus Elan when he was driving through South Kensington. Browne collided with a parked truck and died from his injuries the next day. Potier was not injured in the accident. The Beatles song "A Day in the Life" is often considered to allude to this incident.

Potier had a relationship with Brian Jones (1942–1969), the Rolling Stones guitarist, living with him in Sussex, England.

Potier met Robert Ho, future Hong Kong businessman, the eldest son of Macau gaming tycoon Stanley Ho, while he was a student at the London School of Business, and subsequently married him. Potier and her family lived in Hong Kong. They had two daughters, Sarah Ho and Faye Ho. Potier's daughters were raised in Macau.

== Death ==
On 23 June 1981, Potier and her husband both died in a car crash while on holiday in Portugal.
