= Belem (ship) =

French barque

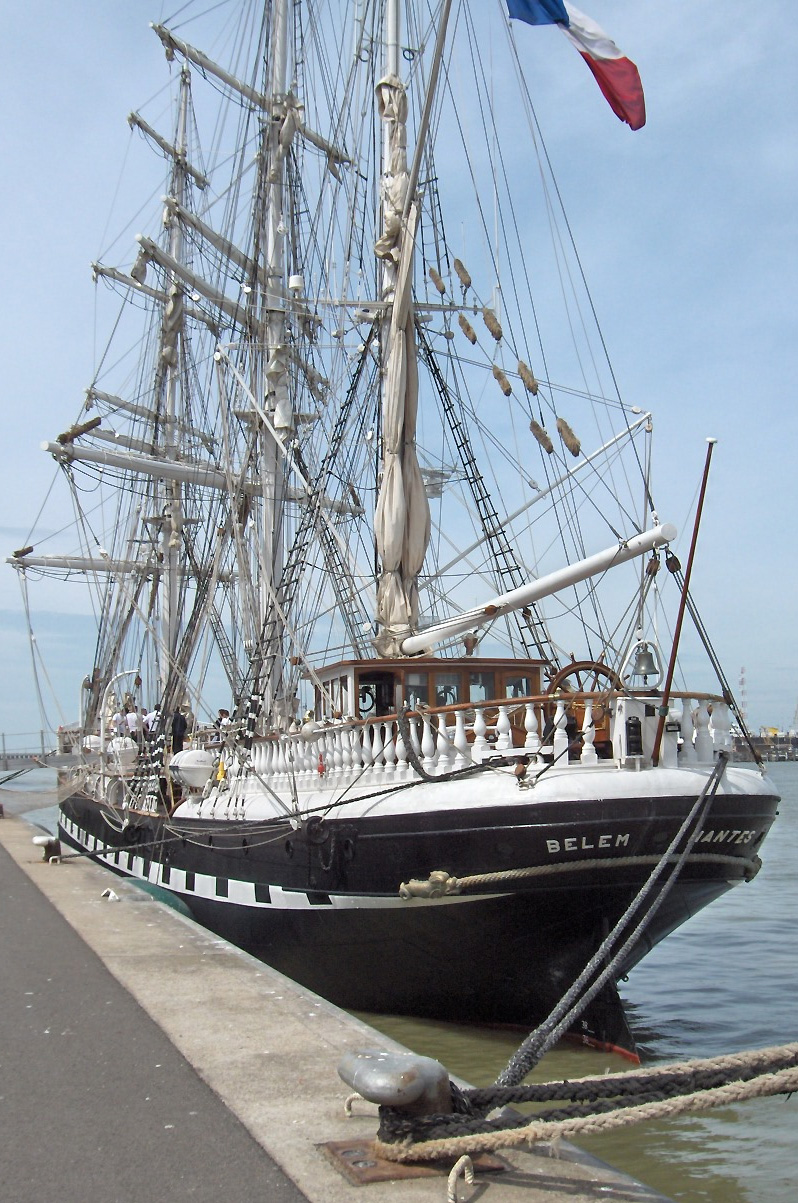
- Belem moored at Ostend, Belgium

History

France
- Name: Belem (1896–1914); Petit Antillais (1914–1921); Fantôme II (1921–1952); Giorgio Cini (1952–1979); Belem (1979–present)
- Namesake: Belém, Brazil
- Builder: Chantiers Dubigeon, Nantes (Chantenay-sur-Loire)
- Launched: 10 June 1896
- Maiden voyage: 31 July 1896 to Montevideo and Belém, Brazil
- Home port: Nantes
- Identification: IMO number: 8622983; MMSI number: 227051000; Callsign: FUZW
- Status: Active

General characteristics
- Tonnage: 406 tons; 534 GRT
- Displacement: 750 tons
- Length: 51 m (167 ft 4 in) LPP; 48 m (157 ft 6 in) LOA; 58 m (190 ft 3 in) (LPP + bowsprit)
- Beam: 8.8 m (28 ft 10 in)
- Draught: 3.6 m (11 ft 10 in)
- Propulsion: 2 x diesel engines
- Sail plan: Barque

Belem is a three-masted barque from France.

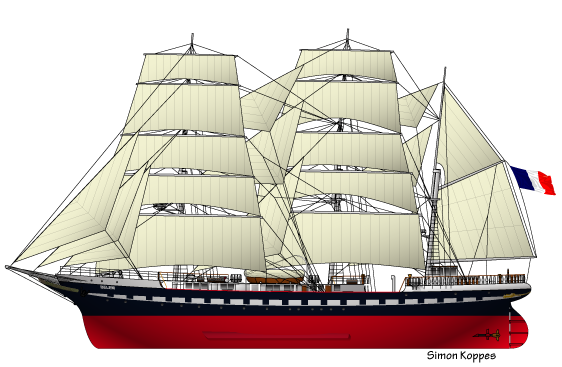
Line art of Belem

She made her maiden voyage as a cargo ship in 1896, transporting sugar from the West Indies, cocoa, and coffee from Brazil and French Guiana to Nantes, France.

== History ==
Belem escaped the eruption of Mount Pelée in Saint-Pierre, Martinique, on 8 May 1902. On arriving at Saint Pierre ahead of the eruption, Captain Julien Chauvelon found that roadsteads were full of vessels. With no place to anchor the ship Chauvelon angrily decided to anchor some miles further away off a beach, which provided shelter when the volcano erupted.

She was sold in 1914 to Hugh Grosvenor, 2nd Duke of Westminster, who converted her to his private luxurious pleasure yacht, complete with two auxiliary Bolinder Diesel engines of 300 HP each.

In 1922 she became the property of Sir Ernest Guinness, of the Guinness family, who renamed her the Fantôme II and revised the rig from a square rigger. Guinness was Rear Commodore of the Royal St. George Yacht Club, in Kingstown, Ireland, from 1921 to 1939. He was Vice Commodore from 1940 to 1948. He took the Fântome II on a cruise in 1923 with his daughters Aileen, Maureen, and Oonagh. They sailed around the world via the Panama and Suez Canals including a visit to Spitsbergen. During her approach to Yokohama harbour while sailing the Pacific Ocean the barque managed to escape another catastrophe - an earthquake which destroyed the harbour and parts of Yokohama city. Guinness died in 1949. The Fântome II was moored in the roads of Cowes, Isle of Wight.

In 1951 she was sold to the industrialist Vittorio Cini, who named her the Giorgio Cini after his son, who had died in a plane crash near Cannes on 31 August 1949 . She was rigged to a barkentine and used as a sail training ship until 1965, when she was considered too old for further use and was moored at the Island of San Giorgio Maggiore, Venice.

In 1972 the Italian carabinieri attempted to restore her to the original barque rig. When this proved too expensive, she became the property of the shipyard. In 1976 the ship was re-rigged to a barque.

Finally, in January 1979, she came back to her home port as the Belem under tow by a French seagoing tug, flying the French flag after 65 years. Fully restored to her original condition, she began a new career as a sail training ship.

On 8 and 9 May 2024, she carried the Olympic flame for the 2024 Summer Olympics torch relay by sailing from Athens, Greece to Marseille.

In August 2025, she is the flagship of Hanse Sail.

== Current specifications of the Belem ==
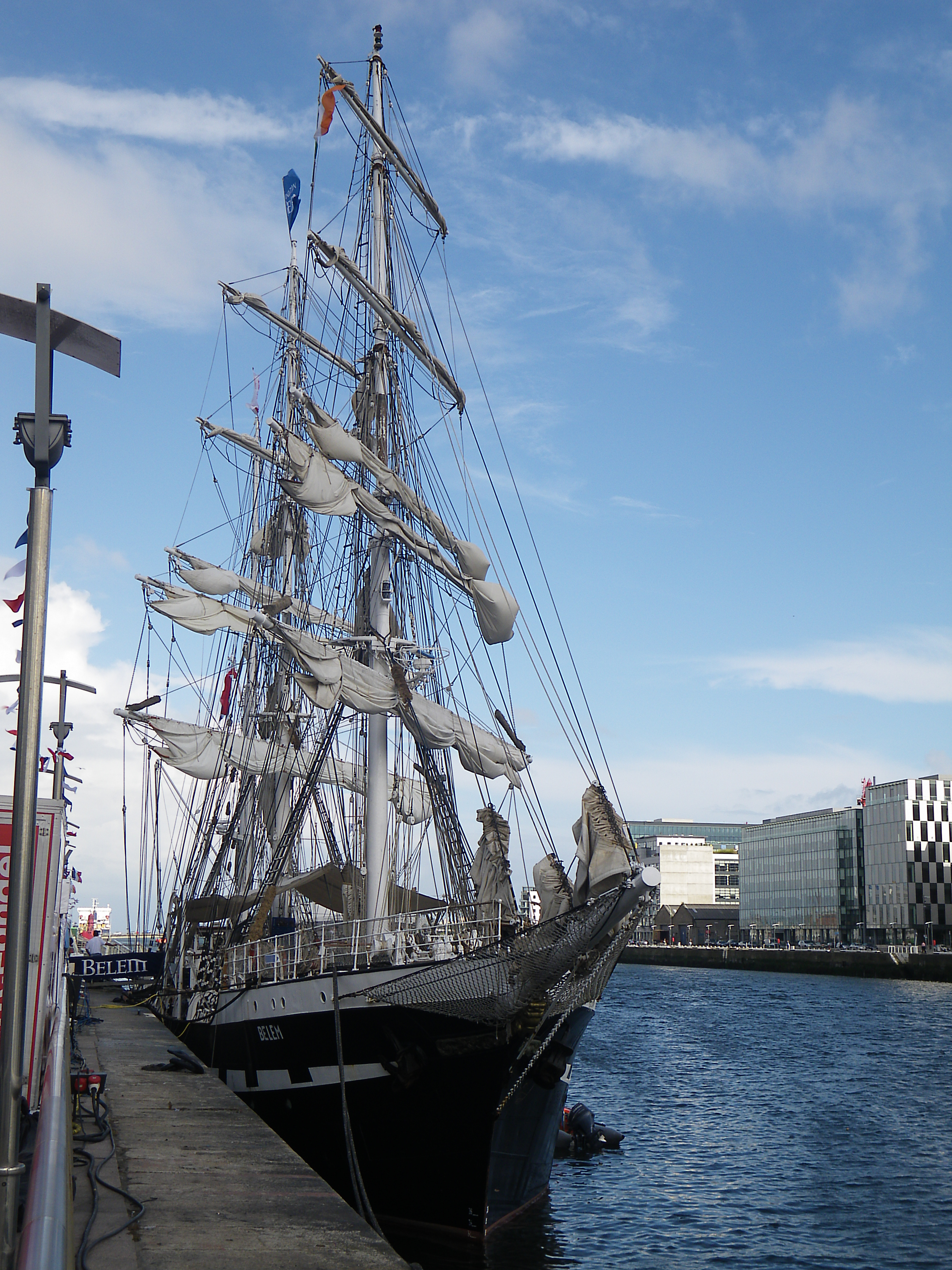
The Belem in Dublin on 14 July 2010

406 tons and 51 m of length

- Riveted steel keel (for older parts)
- Iron sheet: 11 mm
- Ballast in hull: 4,500 pig irons of 50 kg each
- Hull length without bowsprit: 51 m
- Bowsprit length: 7 m
- Extreme length: 58 m
- Waterline length: 48 m
- Midship width: 8.80 m
- Moulded depth: 4.60 m
- Draught: 3.60 m
- B.R.T.: 534 tons
- Displacement: 750 tons

Masting - rigging

- Steel masts in 2 parts (lower mast, topmast)
- Main mast height above waterline level: 34 m
- Lower yards in steel, top gallant and royal yards in wood
- About 220 points of running-rigging
- About 250 simple-blocks, double-blocks and triple-blocks
- 4500 m of running-rigging in polyamide rope

Sails

- Number of sails: 22
- Sail area: 1000,5 m^{2} (all above, without storm sail)

Propulsion and equipment

- Driven by 2 diesel motors: John Deere 6135AFM, 575 HP each (installed February 2013)
- 2 propeller shafts, 2 four-blade propellers
- 3 generators
- Diesel storage: 40 tons
- Cruising range: 24 days at 7 knots, about 4 000 nautical miles (7400 km)
- Fresh water storage: 20 tons
- Production of about 3 tons of water per day via dialyzer
- Electric windlass
- 3 hydraulic capstans (two small on the bridge, one of each side, used to hoist upper yards, but never used during traineeships, one large on the poop, in front of the mizzen mast, used to heave tight hawsers during mooring operations)

Performance

- Maximum speed with engine on flat calm sea: 8 to 9 knots
- Maximum speed with sails: 11 to 12 knots
- 75° abeam wind capability
- Duration to set all sails by good weather conditions: 30 to 40 mn
- Duration to heave tight all sails by good weather conditions: 50 to 60 mn
- Duration of a complete tacking: 15 to 20 mn depending on wind conditions

Crewmen

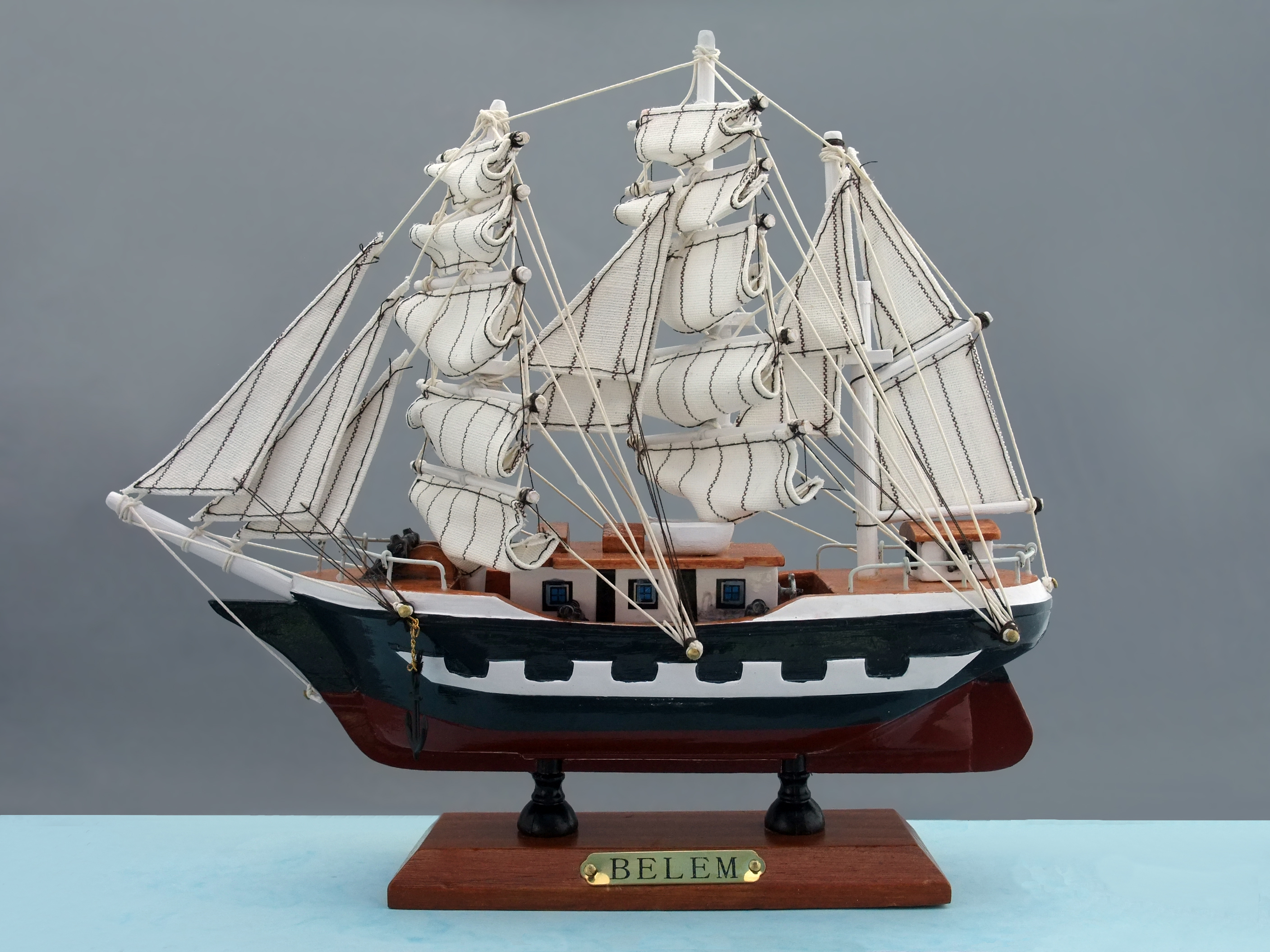
- A completed kit model of Belem.
  16 men: 1 captain, 1 chief officer, 2 lieutenants, 1 chief engineer, 2 cooks, 1 boatswain, 1 carpenter, 7 yardmen (two from the French National Service until 2000)
- Personal management by la Société Nantaise de Navigation
- Maximum number of trainees: 48 (two watches of 24, divided in third of 16)

== See also ==
- Fantome
