= San Fernando Valley Symphony =

Orchestra in California, U.S.

San Fernando Valley Symphony Orchestra
- symphony orchestra
- Short name: SFV Symphony Orchestra
- Founded: 1945 (81 years ago)
- Location: Los Angeles, California, U.S.
- Music director: James Elza Domine (since 1992)
- Website: sfvsymphony.com

The San Fernando Valley Symphony Orchestra (SFV Symphony Orchestra) is an American orchestra, based in the San Fernando Valley in the U.S. state of California.

The orchestra offers regular concert season programming from September until May. Since its founding during World War II, the orchestra has operated with the goal of being a source of great music in the San Fernando Valley, acting as a home for local composers and musical communities from Downtown Los Angeles to Porter Ranch and as far wide as Burbank to Thousand Oaks. The orchestra's shorter summer season during July and August, showcases other musical genres and local artists.

Conducted by James Elza Domine, the orchestra performs in venues across the Los Angeles area.

== History ==
=== 1945–1968: The orchestra's foundation ===
The San Fernando Valley Symphony was co-founded by Ilmari Ronka and his wife, Loraine Vera Ronka née Aalbu in 1946. Its first season was in the same year and the orchestra was made up of mostly studio musicians. Ilmari had previously been first-chair trombone for the NBC Symphony Orchestra and Loraine had traveled as part of the vaudeville group The Four Albee Sisters. Together, they moved to California and co-founded the orchestra in 1945.

James Swift was another conductor who led the San Fernando Valley Symphony Orchestra. He took it on as a way to pursue his love of music and performance, having begun working at Lockheed in Southern California due to World War II. From a musical family in Minnesota, Swift studied multiple instruments, bringing his experience in violin, viola, saxophone, trombone, and eventually conducting to his musical career. At this time, it was a group of like-minded musicians who wanted to share music with the local communities in the growing San Fernando Valley. Swift was dedicated to providing music and opportunities to local musicians regardless of skill-level. Under his guidance, the orchestra offered free performances that showcased local composers while working on building up community connections.

=== 1968: The orchestra and Elmer Bernstein ===
Swift's time with the orchestra came to a close after years of growth-inspired leadership to try to become a professional group for the Valley region. The orchestra searched for a conductor that would galvanize it into a strong, professional orchestra that could be considered on par with the other major regional orchestras. The orchestra's search led it to Hollywood film composer and arranger Elmer Bernstein.

Known for his compositions and arrangements for films, including The Ten Commandments (1956), To Kill a Mockingbird (1962), The Blues Brothers (1980), and Ghostbusters (1984), Bernstein was a definite shift away from a small community group. He led concerts with some of his compositions alongside other major classical pieces and local artists. Many of his works are still held in the orchestra's library as some of his own scores were part of orchestra concert programming. The orchestra grew under his leadership, even though he was only conductor for one season. His reputation and the caliber of his compositions left an impact on the orchestra.

=== 1968–1990: Johnson – Bringing good music to the people of the valley ===
After Bernstein, the orchestra went through multiple conductors and venue changes before closing suddenly in the middle of its 1984 concert season. However, there were still some hopeful orchestra community members working to keep the orchestra alive.

In 1985, the orchestra hired Lois Johnson to be conductor. At 27 years old, Johnson was one of the only female conductors in the region and saw the opportunity to help revive the orchestra as a way of achieving her dream of conducting. She had studied at the Manhattan School of Music and studied conducting privately with Charles Bruck at the Pierre Monteaux School of Conducting in New York. Her husband, William Johnson, supported her in the endeavor. As a lawyer specializing in Japanese business and investments, he worked to help the orchestra make new connections with investors, including a bold call to the Chevron Corporation. Shortly after New Years Day in 1986, the orchestra performed for a 700-person audience where a pre-concert introduction where Ronka returned to the stage to lend his baton to Johnson for use in the program.

Under her direction, the orchestra became the regular group playing the Hollywood Bowl Easter sunrise service and was featured in Christmas programming at the Dorothy Chandler Pavilion. Johnson remained music director and conductor of the orchestra until her departure in 1990.

=== Since 1990: James Domine revives the orchestra ===
The orchestra was dormant for two years after Johnson's departure, and James Elza Domine was in the right room, at the right time. Domine was conductor of the Van Nuys Civic Orchestra Association, another organization established in 1982 with a similar purpose: sharing free-of-charge concerts to the San Fernando Valley area while presenting musicians and composers a place to gather and play in an ensemble. Some orchestra supporters and fellow musicians contacted him and within a few years, the San Fernando Valley Symphony name, music library, and memories were received and reincorporated by Domine. In 1992, the orchestra returned with Domine as conductor.

The name was reaffirmed after it was discovered that there were some similarly named organizations in the area. Swift had created another orchestra in 1968, the Los Angeles Solo Repertory Orchestra, who renamed itself as the New Valley Symphony in 1996. The Valley Symphony Orchestra (Los Angeles), a mixed student and professional group, performed at nearby Valley College.

With Domine as conductor, the orchestra was invited to perform multiple times at the Los Angeles Pierce College Performing Arts Center until its renovations in the early 2010s. The orchestra toured the San Fernando Valley in the years that followed. One notable performance was one of its summer series concerts in 2000 where the orchestra performed "Music of Russian Composers", including Tchaikovsky's 1812 Overture complete with cannons of the 1st Battalion, 144th Field Artillery of the California National Guard at the Warner Center Park in Woodland Hills, California. The orchestre continued to have concerts until the COVID-19 pandemic shuttered many businesses and cancelled planned programming. The orchestra provided digital musical media where it could until it was able to schedule in-person events once more, finding a home at the El Portal Theater. The orchestra was able to continue providing concerts after the pandemic lockdowns and restrictions were lifted. Concert seasons provide with six concerts per year, including holiday programming and collaboration events with local artists, composers, and upcoming soloists.

== Performance venues ==
In the early years, the orchestra performed in smaller venues, often at educational institutions, including Reseda High School, Birmingham High School, local churches or community buildings, before conductors found the opportunity to work with other musical groups. This led to a series of collaborations with choirs at California State University, Northridge in the 1970s and 1980s. Domine and the orchestra were invited to perform at Los Angeles Pierce College in the 1990s and 2000s. The orchestra's time with the college was well attended but came to an end as the Performing Arts Center underwent renovations. During this time, the orchestra "went on tour", performing at various venues across the San Fernando Valley and surrounding communities.

By the time renovations were complete, however, the orchestra had found a stable seasonal venue rotation of performing at the Janet and Ray Scherr Forum Theater in the Thousand Oaks Civic Arts Plaza. As part of its educational endeavors, the orchestra also included the Tutor Family Center for the Performing Arts at Chaminade College Preparatory High School in West Hills, California, and the Agoura High School Performing Arts Education Center theaters in Agoura Hills, California, in its concert seasons. The orchestra moved to the El Portal beginning in its 2022–2023 season.

== Conductors ==
=== Music directors ===
- Ilmari Ronka (1945–1946)
- James Swift (1946–1968)
- Elmer Bernstein (1968)
- Lois Johnson (1968–1990)
- James Elza Domine (since 1992)

=== Assistant conductor ===
- Andy Moresi (since 2024)

=== Guest conductors ===
The orchestra showcases local composers, giving them the opportunity to conduct the orchestra in their works during their concerts and/or world premieres. Other guest conductors in the orchestra's history include:

- Henry Mancini
- Charles Fernandez
- Larry Tuttle
- Cary Belling
- Michael Kibbe
- Yvette Devereaux

== Other artists ==
=== Composers ===
- Elmer Bernstein
- Gary Gertzweig
- Larry Tuttle
- Cary Belling
- James Elza Domine
- Michael Kibbe

The orchestra does not have an official "Composer-in-Residence" or any similar title. However, many of the orchestra's directors and musicians have had their works selected for concert/world premieres.

=== Soloists ===
- Jennifer Bliman
- Ruth Bruegger
- Ernest W. Carbajal
- Daniel Grab
- Nancy Roth

== See also ==
- List of symphony orchestras in the United States
- Music of Los Angeles
