= Dominick Browne, 4th Baron Oranmore and Browne =

British peer & legislator (1901–2002)

The Right Honourable The Lord Oranmore and Browne
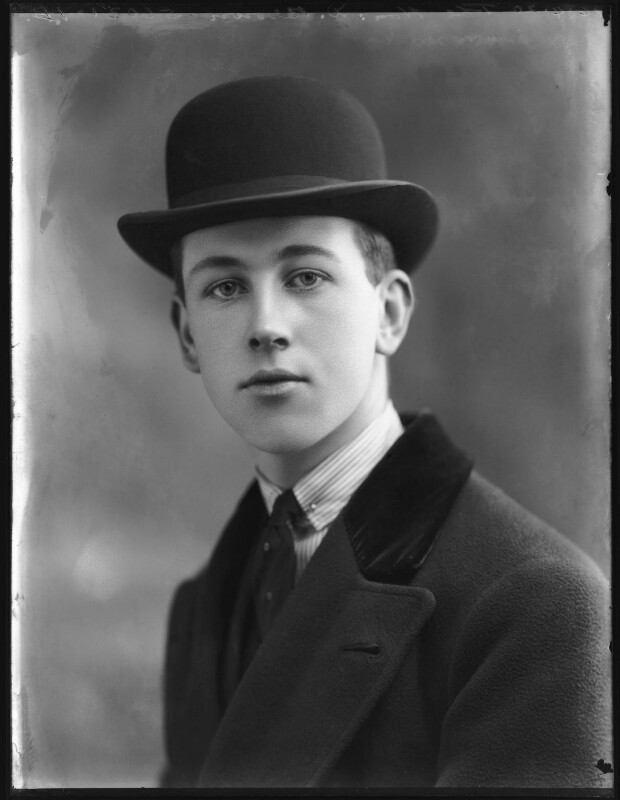
- Browne in 1920

Member of the House of Lords
- Lord Temporal
- In office 30 June 1927 – 11 November 1999 as a hereditary peer
- Preceded by: The 3rd Baron Oranmore and Browne
- Succeeded by: Seat abolished (Note: Pursuant to the House of Lords Act 1999.)

Personal details
- Born: Dominick Geoffrey Edward Browne; 21 October 1901 Dublin, Ireland
- Died: 7 August 2002 (aged 100) Westminster, England
- Spouses: Mildred Egerton (m. 1925; div. 1936) Oonagh Guinness (m. 1936; div. 1950) Sally Gray (m. 1951)
- Children: 8, including: Dominick Browne, 5th Baron Oranmore and Browne; Garech Browne; Tara Browne
- Parent(s): Geoffrey Browne, 3rd Baron Oranmore and Browne; Olwen Verena Ponsonby

Dominick Geoffrey Edward Browne, 4th Baron Oranmore and Browne, 2nd Baron Mereworth (21 October 1901 – 7 August 2002), was a British peer and legislator. He served in the House of Lords for 72 years, longer than any other peer up to that time (ending only by eviction during government reforms in 1999).

== Biography ==
He was born into an Anglo-Irish aristocratic family as the Hon. Dominick Geoffrey Edward Browne in 1901, the eldest son of the 3rd Baron Oranmore and Browne and Lady Olwen Verena Ponsonby, daughter of the 8th Earl of Bessborough. He was educated at Eton and Christ Church, Oxford, before joining the Grenadier Guards, serving 1921–1922 as a second lieutenant.

In 1927, he succeeded his father and took his seat in the House of Lords as Baron Mereworth, a title in the Peerage of the United Kingdom (the older barony of Oranmore and Browne, in the Peerage of Ireland, did not entitle its bearer to a seat in the Lords), although he primarily used his Irish title. He sat in the House of Lords for 72 years, the longest by any peer up to that time, and during that time was one of the few peers to have never spoken in the House.

In 1930, the English residence of the Browne family, Mereworth Castle, was sold and he went to live in his Irish residence, Castle MacGarrett, just outside Claremorris in County Mayo. Castle MacGarrett, its 3,000 acres (1,200 ha) and 150 employees gave him the chance to breed racehorses and farm on a large scale. Lord Oranmore and Browne was also an aviator.

In 1939, Oranmore and Browne tried to rejoin the British Army, but he was told that, at 38, he would be more useful concentrating on farming; as a result, his war service was in neutral Ireland with the Irish reserve force, the Local Defence Force, in County Mayo.

In the early 1950s, the castle was acquired by the Irish Government's Irish Land Commission and turned into a nursing home. Lord Oranmore and Browne went to live in London.

== Personal life ==
Lord Oranmore and Browne married three times :

- First, 1925, Mildred Helen Egerton, daughter of the Hon. Thomas Henry Frederick Egerton of the earls of Ellesmere and Lady Bertha Anson of the earls of Lichfield (marriage dissolved 1936). Children from this marriage:
  - Hon. Patricia Helen Browne (16 February 1926 – 1981)
  - Hon. Brigid Verena Browne (25 December 1927 – 3 January 1941)
  - Dominick Geoffrey Thomas Browne (born 1 July 1929), succeeded his father as 5th Baron Oranmore and Browne and 3rd Baron Mereworth but known as Lord Mereworth
  - Hon. Martin Michael Dominick Browne (27 October 1931 – 14 June 2013)
  - Hon. Judith Browne (born 23 September 1934)
- Second, 1936, Oonagh Guinness, daughter of Ernest Guinness and an heir to the Guinness brewery fortune (marriage dissolved 1950). Children from this marriage:
  - Hon. Garech Domnagh Browne (25 June 1939 – 10 March 2018)
  - An unnamed son (28 December 1943 – 30 December 1943)
  - Hon. Tara Browne (4 March 1945 – 18 December 1966), killed in a car accident
- Third, 1951, Constance Stevens, an actress with the stage name Sally Gray, famous for her roles on the stage and in various movies in the 1930s and 40s.

Lord Oranmore and Browne died in London on 7 August 2002 at the age of 100.

== Notes ==
Peerage of Ireland
Preceded by Geoffrey Browne	Baron Oranmore and Browne; 1927–2002	Succeeded by Dominick Browne
Peerage of the United Kingdom
Preceded by Geoffrey Browne	Baron Mereworth; 1927–2002; Member of the House of Lords (1927–1999)	Succeeded by Dominick Browne
Honorary titles
Preceded by The Earl Amherst	Longest-serving member in the House of Lords; 1993–1999	Succeeded by The Earl Jellicoe
