= Geoffrey Browne, 3rd Baron Oranmore and Browne =

Irish politician (1861–1927)

The Right Honourable The Lord Oranmore and Browne KP PC (Ire) JP DL

Representative Peer of Ireland
- In office 17 July 1902 – 19 January 1926

Member of the House of Lords (Note: As Baron Mereworth.)
- Lord Temporal
- In office 19 January 1926 – 30 June 1927
- Preceded by: Peerage created
- Succeeded by: Dominick Browne

Personal details
- Born: Geoffrey Henry Browne-Guthrie; 6 January 1861
- Died: 30 June 1927 (aged 66)

Geoffrey Henry Browne, 3rd Baron Oranmore and Browne, 1st Baron Mereworth, KP, PC (Ire), JP, DL (born Browne-Guthrie; 6 January 1861 – 30 June 1927) was an Irish politician.

== Career ==
Oranmore was the only son of Geoffrey Browne-Guthrie, 2nd Baron Oranmore and Browne, and his Scottish wife, Christina (née Guthrie). He was educated at Trinity College, Cambridge, and succeeded his father in the barony in 1900. Following in his father's footsteps, he was elected an Irish representative peer on 11 July 1902, and he took the oath and his seat in the House of Lords six days later. In 1906 he dropped the additional surname "Guthrie" which his father had been obliged to adopt in order to succeed to his own father-in-law's estates.

He was a Justice of the Peace and Deputy Lieutenant for County Mayo and was appointed High Sheriff of Mayo for 1890. He was a member of the Irish Convention in 1917–1918, a commissioner of the Congested Districts Board for Ireland from 1919, and a member of the Senate of Southern Ireland from 1921.

He was appointed Knight of the Order of St Patrick (KP) in 1918 and was appointed to the Privy Council for Ireland in the 1921 Birthday Honours.

In January 1926 he was raised to the Peerage of the United Kingdom as Baron Mereworth, of Mereworth Castle (his seat in Kent), although he continued to use his Irish title in preference.

== Personal life ==
He married Lady Olwen Verena Ponsonby, the eldest daughter of Edward Ponsonby, 8th Earl of Bessborough. He was succeeded by his son, Dominick Geoffrey Edward Browne.

== Footnotes ==
Peerage of Ireland
Preceded by Geoffrey Browne-Guthrie	Baron Oranmore and Browne; 1900–1927	Succeeded by Dominick Browne
Peerage of the United Kingdom
New creation	Baron Mereworth; 1926–1927; Member of the House of Lords (1926–1927)	Succeeded by Dominick Browne
Parliament of the United Kingdom
Preceded by The Viscount Frankfort de Montmorency	Representative peer for Ireland; 1902–1926	Office lapsed
