= Maudie Littlehampton =

Cartoon character

"The opening of historic buildings": Maudie, with Willy Littlehampton in a 1957 Osbert Lancaster pocket cartoon

Maud, Countess of Littlehampton, known as Maudie, is a cartoon character created by Osbert Lancaster. From the late 1940s until Lancaster’s retirement in 1981 Maudie was the leading character in his regular cast of his pocket cartoons in The Daily Express.

== "Biography" ==
For a humorous exhibition at the National Portrait Gallery, London in 1973, Lancaster created a lineage and background for Maudie. She is supposedly the only daughter of Sir Julian Manifest, Bt, and his wife Lady Claribel Manifest, third daughter of the 5th Marquess of Pontefract. Lancaster's biography of her records her as a debutante in the late 1920s, which would put her year of birth at about 1910 (Lancaster was born in 1908).

At some unspecified date in the inter-war years Maudie married her distant cousin, William Courantsdair, Viscount Draynefleet, the eldest son and heir of the 7th Earl of Littlehampton, who succeeded his father in the earldom in 1937. During the Second World War, during which her husband was on active service in the Household Cavalry, she worked in MI5, MI6, SOE, PWE and the YWCA. Lancaster adds that she was also constantly liaising with the Free French, and towards the end of the war worked in the British Embassy in Cairo.

Willy Littlehampton's political activities in the House of Lords were few but effective, and in the post-war decades Maudie contemplated going into politics. At the 1951 General Election she stood as a Liberal candidate, (Note: In September 1951 Lancaster shows her apologetically saying to her husband, "O Willy darling, please don't be cross, but such a pathetic little man came to the door and asked me to stand as a Liberal candidate that I said 'Yes'.") but lost her deposit twice: the first time to the Labour candidate, in a game of pontoon. Her policy was to have no policy, as neither of the other parties had one. Thereafter, her eclectic views – extreme right on some matters and extreme left on others – prevented her adoption by any of the British parties. She was a non-party independent member of her local council, and as chairman of its planning committee she successfully strove to preserve the green belt around the town of Draynefleet.

== Character ==
Lancaster had been contributing pocket cartoons to The Daily Express since 1939, but it was not until after the war that he developed a repertory company of characters in whose mouths he put his social and political jokes. Maudie quickly became his star character and principal mouthpiece. She began as what he called "a slightly dotty class symbol", but developed into "a voice of straightforward comment which might be my own". Her comments on the fads and peculiarities of the day caught the public imagination; the art historian Bevis Hillier called her "an iconic figure to rank with Low's Colonel Blimp and Giles's Grandma".

Various candidates have been proposed as the model for Maudie. They include Patsy, wife of the second Lord Jellicoe, Maureen, Countess of Dufferin and Ava, an ex-actress, Pru Wallace, with whom Lancaster had been briefly emotionally entangled during the war, and Anne Scott-James, whom Lancaster had known for many years before their marriage in 1967. Lancaster maintained that she was not based on any one real person.

Around Maudie, the supporting cast included Willy, usually confused but occasionally shrewd; two formidable dowagers: the Littlehamptons' Great-Aunt Edna, and Mrs Frogmarch, a middle-class Tory activist; Canon Fontwater, a personification of the Church Militant; Mrs Rajagojollibarmi, an Asian politician; Father O'Bubblegum, Fontwater's Roman Catholic opposite number; and the Littlehamptons’ children, Jennifer, Torquil and Patricia.

== Critical reception ==
Lancaster used Maudie not only to express social comment, but as an exemplar of current fashions. His colleague Nicholas Garland commented, "If you look only at the clothes in his drawings, you see what a master he was. Maudie Littlehampton's outfits are superb – never the same one twice – and drawn with great love. … Maudie, herself, is a magnificent invention – his masterpiece". In 2008 Peter York called Maudie "a brilliantly realised comic impersonation":

Lady Littlehampton, married into a fictitious earldom with Norman origins, spoke for her class and generation, but at the same time allowed the Express's lower-middle-class readers to identify with her, to see her as a friend. Maudie was witty, well-dressed and well-informed in that keep-it-light-let's-not-get-Boringly-Serious way sophisticated women of her class were. So Maudie's take on everything from the nuclear threat to teenage fashions struck a chord in Belgravia but also in deferential suburban Britain.

Another cartoonist, Martin Rowson, has said that in Maudie it is possible to see her creator's views and intentions: "The great thing about Osbert is that although he appealed to the establishment, he was in fact deeply subversive. His best-known character, Maudie Littehampton, was in fact far more subversive than she first appeared. And the truly amazing thing is that Osbert was able to show his work on the front page of Beaverbrook's Daily Express, undermining everything that the Express stood for in a subtle and quite saucy way."

The Times commented that Maudie was "Lancaster's most enduring cartoon creation, who, over the years, grew elegantly older while remaining as sharp and outraged as ever". The paper quoted Lancaster: "She's had a lot to cope with in the way of social revolution", and concluded that Maudie and her husband made their own contribution to the social and cultural history of the period.

== Notes, references and sources ==
=== Sources ===
- Boston, Richard (1989). Osbert: A Portrait of Osbert Lancaster. London: Collins. ISBN 978-0-00-216324-8.
- Howard, Paul (2016). I Read the News Today, Oh Boy. London: Picador. ISBN 978-1-5098-0005-6.
- Knox, James (2008). Cartoons and Coronets: The Genius of Osbert Lancaster. London: Frances Lincoln. ISBN 978-0-7112-2938-9.
- Lancaster, Osbert (1984). The Littlehampton Saga. London: Methuen. ISBN 978-0-413-54990-7.
