= Baron Oranmore and Browne =

Title in the Peerage of Ireland

Baron Oranmore and Browne, of Carrabrowne Castle in the County of Galway and of Castle Macgarrett in the County of Mayo, is a title in the Peerage of Ireland. It was created in 1836 for Dominick Browne, who had earlier represented County Mayo in the House of Commons. His son, the second Baron, sat in the House of Lords as an Irish representative peer from 1869 to 1900. He had added the surname of Guthrie to his own on his marriage in 1859 to Christina Guthrie. He was succeeded by his son, the third Baron. He was an Irish Representative Peer from 1902 to 1926 and a member of the short-lived Senate of Southern Ireland. In 1926 he was created Baron Mereworth, of Mereworth Castle in the County of Kent, in the Peerage of the United Kingdom. This title gave the barons an automatic seat in the House of Lords until the passing of the House of Lords Act 1999. On his death in 1927 the title passed to his son, the fourth Baron. He married, as his third wife, the actress Sally Gray. Lord Oranmore and Browne died in August 2002, aged 100 years and 291 days. He was thereby the third-oldest hereditary peer ever. As of 2014 the titles are held by his son, the fifth Baron, who succeeded in 2002.

In May 2011, Mereworth went to court to attempt to force the House of Lords to issue him a Writ of Summons allowing him to sit and vote in the House by virtue of the Letters Patent issued in the creation of the barony. The case – Baron Mereworth v Ministry of Justice – was dismissed on the grounds that the High Court did not have jurisdiction on how the House of Lords conducted its business. Furthermore, even if the court did have jurisdiction, the House of Lords Act 1999 clearly withdrew the right of holders of Letters Patent to be issued a Writ of Summons purely "by virtue" of those Letters. Mereworth was also ordered to pay £8,800 in costs. This case was referenced as precedent in the official rebuttal of a claim by Viscount Monckton that he was entitled to claim membership of the House of Lords.

== Baron Oranmore and Browne (1836) ==
- Dominick Browne, 1st Baron Oranmore and Browne (1787–1860)
- Geoffrey Dominick Augustus Frederick Browne-Guthrie, 2nd Baron Oranmore and Browne (1819–1900)
- Geoffrey Henry Browne, 3rd Baron Oranmore and Browne (1861–1927) (created Baron Mereworth [UK] in 1926)
- Dominick Geoffrey Edward Browne, 4th Baron Oranmore and Browne (1901–2002)
- Dominick Geoffrey Thomas Browne, 5th Baron Oranmore and Browne (born 1929)

The heir presumptive is the present holder's nephew, Shaun Dominick Browne (born 1964). His heir apparent is his eldest son, Hugo Dominick Browne (born 1997).

== Line of succession ==
- Dominick Browne, 1st Baron Oranmore and Browne (1787–1860)
  - Geoffrey Dominick Augustus Frederick Browne-Guthrie, 2nd Oranmore and Browne (1819–1900)
    - Geoffrey Henry Browne, 3rd Baron Oranmore and Browne, 1st Baron Mereworth (1861–1927)
      - Dominick Geoffrey Edward Browne, 4th Baron Oranmore and Browne, 2nd Baron Mereworth (1901–2002)
        - Dominick Geoffrey Thomas Browne, 5th Baron Oranmore and Browne, 3rd Baron Mereworth (born 1929)
        - Hon. Martin Michael Dominick Browne (1931–2013)
          - (1) Shaun Dominick Browne (b. 1964)
            - (2) Hugo Dominick Browne (b. 1997)
            - (3) Myles Henry Browne (b. 1999)
        - Hon. Tara Browne (1945–1966)
          - (4) Dorian Clifford Browne (b. 1963)
            - (5) Sebastian Browne (b. 1994)
            - (6) Gabriel Browne (b. 1997)
          - (7) Julian Dominick Browne (b. 1965)
            - (8) Nicolai Tara Dillon Browne (b. 1999)
            - (9) Joachim Browne (b. 2002)

== Ancestry ==
Ancestors of Baron Oranmore and Browne

8. Geoffrey Browne-Guthrie, 2nd Baron Oranmore and Browne
4. Geoffrey Browne, 3rd Baron Oranmore and Browne
9. Christina Guthrie
2. Dominick Browne, 4th Baron Oranmore and Browne
10. Edward Ponsonby, 8th Earl of Bessborough
5. Lady Olwen Ponsonby
11. Blanche Guest
1. Dominick Browne, 5th Baron Oranmore and Browne
12. Francis Egerton, 3rd Earl of Ellesmere
6. Hon. Thomas Egerton
13. Lady Katherine Phipps
3. Mildred Egerton
14. Thomas Anson, 3rd Earl of Lichfield
7. Lady Bertha Anson
15. Lady Mildred Coke
