= Basil Hamilton-Temple-Blackwood, 4th Marquess of Dufferin and Ava =

British politician

The Most Honourable The Marquess of Dufferin and Ava

Under-Secretary of State for the Colonies
- In office 1937–1940
- Preceded by: The Earl De La Warr
- Succeeded by: George Hall

Lord-in-waiting to King George VI
- In office 1936–1937
- Preceded by: The Earl of Feversham
- Succeeded by: The Earl Fortescue

Personal details
- Born: Basil Sheridan Hamilton-Temple-Blackwood; 6 April 1909
- Died: 25 March 1945 (aged 35) Burma
- Party: Conservative
- Spouse: Maureen Constance Guinness (m. 1930)
- Children: 3, including Caroline and Sheridan
- Parents: The 3rd Marquess of Dufferin and Ava (father); Brenda Woodhouse (mother)
- Relatives: Lord Basil Temple Blackwood (uncle); The 2nd Marquess of Dufferin and Ava (uncle); Evgenia Citkowitz (granddaughter)
- Education: Lockers Park School; Eton College
- Alma mater: Balliol College, Oxford

Basil Sheridan Hamilton-Temple-Blackwood, 4th Marquess of Dufferin and Ava (6 April 1909 – 25 March 1945), styled Earl of Ava from 1918 until 1930, was a Conservative politician and soldier of the United Kingdom.

== Early life ==
Dufferin was the eldest child, and only son, of the 3rd Marquess of Dufferin and Ava and the former Brenda Woodhouse. Following his father's succession to the marquessate in 1918, he was known as the Earl of Ava. His grandfather, a descendant of the 18th-century playwright Richard Brinsley Sheridan, "was the cultured and worldly 1st Marquess of Dufferin and Ava", who served as the Viceroy and Governor-General of India.

He was educated at Lockers Park School and Eton College, and then at Balliol College, Oxford. At Eton, when aged sixteen, he won the coveted Rosebery Prize, the highest possible distinction for a history pupil. At Oxford, he was friends with, among others, the future 7th Earl of Longford (Frank Longford). He was also a contemporary and close friend of the poet John Betjeman. Betjeman wrote of his friend as "the dark, heavy-lidded companion" in his poem Brackenbury Scholar of Balliol.

== Career ==
After university, Lord Dufferin pursued a career in politics. He made his maiden speech in the House of Lords in December 1931, aged just 22, during a debate on India. Only a few days later he was appointed to the Indian Franchise Committee, which was to tour the country during its research.

After his return from India he was appointed Parliamentary Private Secretary to the 11th Marquess of Lothian, who was Under-Secretary of State for India, and then to the 3rd Viscount Halifax (later the 1st Earl of Halifax), who was successively President of the Board of Education from 1932 to 1935, Secretary of State for War in 1935, and Lord Privy Seal from 1935 to 1937. Lord Dufferin was chairman of the Primrose League from 1932 to 1934, a Lord-in-waiting to King George VI from 1936 to 1937, and was himself appointed Under-Secretary of State for the Colonies in 1937, serving until his resignation in 1940.

=== War service ===
In 1940, he resigned from the government to join the British Army, refusing a post in the World War II coalition government of Winston Churchill. He received a commission as a captain in the Royal Horse Guards in July 1940 but was released from the Army in 1941 to become Director of the Empire Division of the Ministry of Information. The following year, he undertook a special mission abroad for the ministry, and rejoined the Army in 1944.

Lord Dufferin was serving with the Indian Field Broadcasting Unit on 25 March 1945 when he was filmed demanding the surrender of Japanese troops who were sheltered in a tunnel; the film then captured Lord Dufferin's death when a Japanese mortar shell landed on the unit, just a few weeks short of his 36th birthday.

== Personal life ==
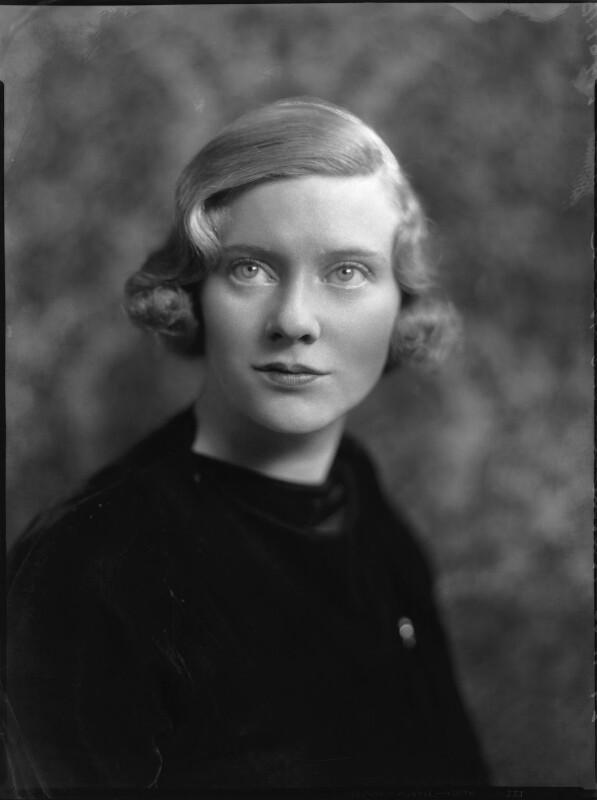
Maureen Constance Hamilton-Temple-Blackwood (née Guinness), Marchioness of Dufferin and Ava, by Bassano Ltd, 1933

On 3 July 1930, Lord Dufferin and Ava was married to brewery heiress Maureen Constance Guinness, the second daughter of Hon. Arthur Ernest Guinness, himself the second son of the 1st Earl of Iveagh, at St. Margaret's, Westminster. They had three children:

- Lady Caroline Maureen Hamilton-Temple-Blackwood (1931–1996), who married three times; first to Lucian Freud (son of architect Ernst L. Freud and grandson of Sigmund Freud), secondly to Israel Citkowitz, and lastly to American poet Robert Lowell.
- Lady Perdita Maureen Hamilton-Temple-Blackwood (b. 1934)
- Sheridan Frederick Terence Hamilton-Temple-Blackwood, 5th and last Marquess of Dufferin and Ava (1938–1988), who married his fourth cousin Serena Belinda "Lindy" Rosemary Guinness in 1964.

Because he has no known grave in Burma, Lord Dufferin is commemorated by the Commonwealth War Graves Commission, his name listed on Face 1 of the Rangoon Memorial in Taukkyan War Cemetery. In the family burial ground of Campo Santo at Clandeboye, County Down a Celtic cross stands to mark his loss and the earlier losses of the Dufferin family to war. His friend John Betjeman wrote the poem In Memory of Basil, Marquess of Dufferin and Ava in his memory.

His widow married twice after his death, first to Major Harry Alexander Desmond ('Kelpie') Buchanan MC in 1948 (divorced 1954) and second in 1955 to judge John Maude QC (1901–1986), but against precedent always used the title she acquired from her first marriage. Maureen, Lady Dufferin, died on 3 May 1998 and is buried at Clandeboye.

== Arms ==
Coat of arms of Basil Hamilton-Temple-Blackwood, 4th Marquess of Dufferin and Ava

Coronet
A Coronet of an Marquess
Crest
1st: On a Cap of Maintenance Gules turned up Ermine a Crescent Argent (Blackwood); 2nd, On a Ducal Coronet Or a Martlet Gold (Temple); 3rd, a Demi-Antelope affrontée Ermine attired and unguled Or holding between his hoofs a Heart Gules (Hamilton, Earl of Clanbrassill)
Escutcheon
Quarterly, 1st and 4th, Azure a Fess Or in chief a Crescent Argent between two Mullets of the second and in base a Mascle of the third (Blackwood); 2nd, quarterly, 1st and 4th, Or an Eagle displayed Sable, 2nd and 3rd, Argent two Bars Sable each charged with three Martlets Or (Temple); 3rd, Gules three Cinquefoils pierced Ermine on a Chief Or a Lion passant of the field (Hamilton, Earl of Clanbrassill)
Supporters
Dexter: a Lion Gules armed and langued Azure gorged with a Tressure flory-counterflory Or; Sinister: an Heraldic Tiger Ermine gorged with a like Tressure Gules; each supporter supporting a Flag Staff proper therefrom flowing a Banner Or charged with a Peacock in his Pride also proper
Motto
Per Vias Rectas (By straight ways)

Political offices
Preceded by The Earl of Feversham	Lord-in-waiting; 1936–1937	Succeeded by The Earl Fortescue
Preceded by The Earl De La Warr	Under-Secretary of State for the Colonies; 1937–1940	Succeeded by George Hall
Peerage of the United Kingdom
Preceded by Frederick Hamilton-Temple-Blackwood	Marquess of Dufferin and Ava; 1930–1945	Succeeded by Sheridan Hamilton-Temple-Blackwood
