= Oonagh Guinness =

Golden Guinness Girl of the 1920s

The Right Honourable The Baroness Oranmore
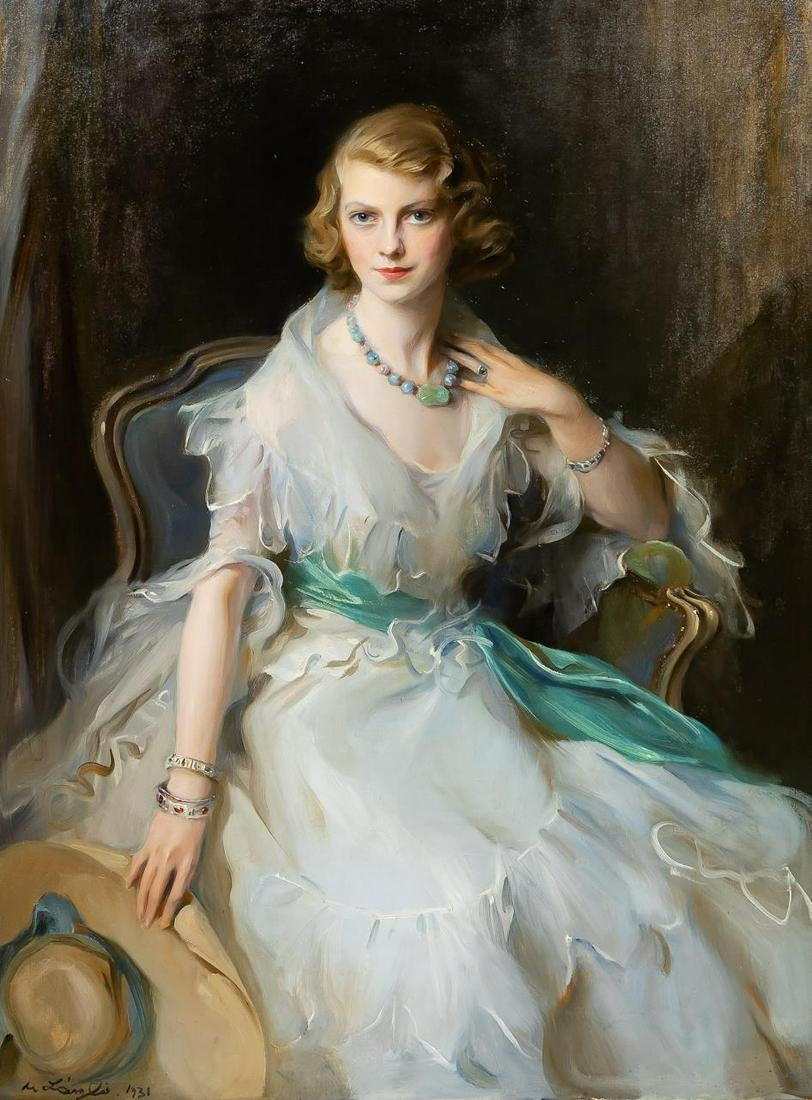
- Portrait by Philip de László, 1931
- Born: 22 February 1910; London, England
- Died: 2 August 1995 (aged 85); Luggala, County Wicklow, Ireland
- Known for: Socialite, society hostess and art collector; one of the Golden Guinness Girls
- Spouses: Hon. Philip Kindersley (m. 1929–1936) Dominick Browne, 4th Baron Oranmore (m. 1936–1950)
- Children: Gay Kindersley, Garech Browne and Tara Browne
- Parent(s): Ernest Guinness; Marie Clothilde Russell
- Relatives: Aileen Guinness (sister); Maureen Constance Guinness (sister); Edward Guinness, 1st Earl of Iveagh (grandfather); Sir George Russell, 4th Baronet (grandfather)
- Family: Guinness

Oonagh Browne, Baroness Oranmore (née Guinness ; 22 February 1910 – 2 August 1995) was an Anglo-Irish socialite, society hostess and art collector, and the second wife of Dominick Browne, 4th Baron Oranmore and Browne.

== Early life ==
She was born on 22 February 1910 in Hanover Square, London, the youngest of the three daughters of Ernest Guinness (1876–1949) and Marie Clothilde Russell (1873–1953), daughter of Sir George Russell, 4th Baronet. Ernest Guinness was the second son of Edward Guinness, 1st Earl of Iveagh (1847–1927). She believed that she was "the favourite of her father's three blonde and blue-eyed daughters". Along with her two sisters, Aileen and Maureen, the Guinness sisters were celebrated as the Golden Guinness Girls of 1920s British society.

== Public life ==
Oonagh was a prominent hostess, particularly after her second divorce in 1950, when the Luggala Estate became a centre of Irish social life. "Oonagh somehow imbued Luggala with enchantment. Nobody could keep away: Dublin intelligentsia, literati, painters, actors, scholars, hangers-on, toffs, punters, poets, social hang-gliders were attracted to Luggala as to nowhere else in Ireland — perhaps even in Europe, from where many would come. And the still centre of this exultant, exuberant chaos was Oonagh."

== Personal life ==
At age 19, Oonagh was engaged to the Hon. Philip Kindersley, the second son of the banker Robert Kindersley, 1st Baron Kindersley. In 1929, she married the Hon. Philip Kindersley, and they had two children, though only one lived to reach adulthood as her daughter Teresa died as a teenager and is buried on the shores of Lough Tay near Luggala. Gay Kindersley (1930–2011), National Hunt jockey and Jockey Club steward was her son. Their marriage was dissolved in 1936.

In 1936, she married Dominick Browne, 4th Baron Oranmore and Browne, and her father gave her Luggala, an 18th-century hunting lodge in County Wicklow. They had three children: Garech Domnagh Browne (1939–2018), an unnamed son (1943–1943), and Tara Browne (1945–1966), who died in a car accident. Tara and the unnamed boy are buried beside Teresa. Oonagh and Dominick divorced in 1950.

From 1957 to 1965, she was married to Miguel Ferreras Aciro (1927–1999), a New York dress designer. He was extravagant and a controversial figure, who later was discovered to be an ex-fascist imposter – they divorced in 1965.

She died at her famous residence, Luggala on 2 August 1995.
