= Aileen Plunket =

Anglo-Irish society hostess (1904–1999)

- Hon. Mrs. Brinsley Plunket in 1929
- Born: Aileen Sibell Mary Guinness; 16 May 1904; Grosvenor Place, London, England
- Died: 31 March 1999 (aged 94); Elveden, Suffolk, England
- Known for: Socialite
- Spouses: Hon. Brinsley Sheridan Plunket (m. 1927; div. 1940) Valerian Stux-Rybar (m. 1956; div. 1965)
- Parent(s): Ernest Guinness; Marie Clothilde Russell
- Relatives: Maureen Constance Guinness (sister); Oonagh Guinness (sister); Edward Guinness, 1st Earl of Iveagh (grandfather); Sir George Russell, 4th Baronet (grandfather)
- Family: Guinness

Aileen Sibell Mary Plunket (née Guinness; 16 May 1904 – 31 March 1999) was an Anglo-Irish society hostess. She was one of the "Guinness Golden Girls" who were icons in the 1920s, along with her sisters Maureen and Oonagh.

== Life ==
Plunket was one of three daughters of Hon. Ernest Guinness and Marie Clothilde Russell (1873–1953). She was part of the rich and well-connected Guinness family – the eldest of the grandchildren of Lord Iveagh. As a girl, she lived at Glenmaroon in Chapelizod near Dublin. Her father lavished money on his daughters, but his primary interest was in his business.

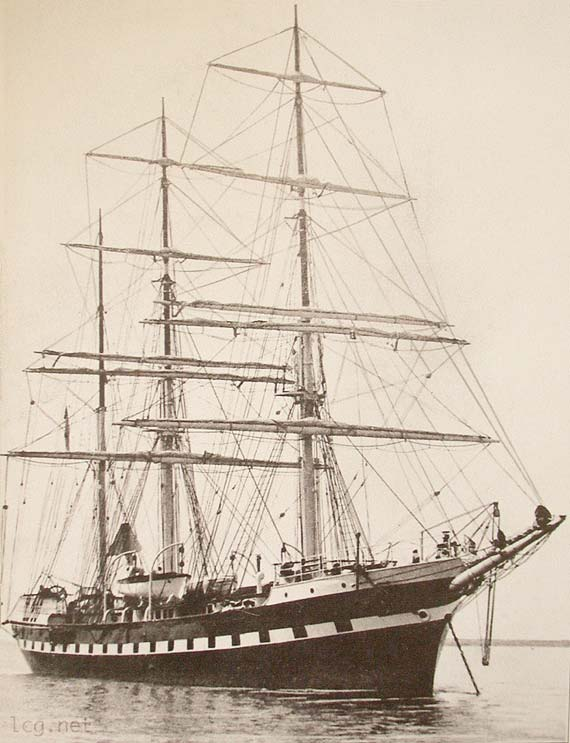
The high masted yacht she toured in a few years before

In 1923, she and her sisters underwent a world tour in her father's high-masted yacht, Fantome II. All three of the girls married well. Her sisters went to live at the mansions of Clandeboye and Luggala. Her father bought her Luttrellstown Castle near Dublin after she married Hon. Brinsley Sheridan Bushe Plunket (1903-1941), second son of William Lee Plunket, 5th Baron Plunket, in 1927.

Over the next 50 years, Plunket redesigned the interiors of Luttrellstown Castle using the services of Felix Harbord. The castle and, particularly, the dining room still reflect their changes.

Plunket held large parties, including an extensive bar.

Her husband was killed during the war just after they had divorced in 1940.

In 1956, she married the interior designer Valerian Stux-Rybar, but this ended in divorce in 1965. He was extravagant and Plunket's lifestyle had to be trimmed. This was in part after her father died in 1949 and death duties had to be paid. She sold the castle in 1983 and retired to residences at Elveden Hall and London. She died on 31 March 1999.
