= Gay Kindersley =

British jump jockey and horse trainer

- Born: 2 June 1930
- Died: 21 April 2011 (aged 80)
- Education: Eton; Christ Church, Oxford
- Occupations: Champion amateur jump jockey and horse trainer
- Spouses: Margaret "Magsie" Wakefield (m. 1956–1976) Philippa Harper (m. 1976)
- Children: 6
- Parent(s): Hon. Philip Kindersley; Oonagh Guinness
- Relatives: Robert Kindersley, 1st Baron Kindersley (grandfather)

Gay Kindersley (2 June 1930 – 21 April 2011) was a British champion amateur jump jockey, horse trainer and a "drinker, gambler and serial womaniser".

== Early life ==
Gay Kindersley was born on 2 June 1930, the son of the Hon. Philip Kindersley, and his wife Oonagh Guinness, and grandson of Robert Kindersley, 1st Baron Kindersley. He was educated at Eton, followed by Christ Church, Oxford, where he remained for only two terms.

== Career ==
After Oxford, Kindersley joined the 7th Hussars, and served in Germany. At the age of 21, he announced that he wanted to get married, so his family sent him to Canada, where he worked as an oil rig "roughneck", and as a Calgary Stampede rodeo competitor.

On his return to the UK, he continued as an amateur jockey, and in the 1959–60 season, won the amateur jockeys' championship with 22 winners from 100 rides, all but five of the 100 on his own horses.

Kindersley broke his back at Stratford in 1955, and again at Hurst Park in 1962, after which his doctor told him to stop riding; he ignored the advice, and continued. He retired as a National Hunt jockey in 1965, and as a flat racing jockey in 1969.

Before he retired, he started work as a trainer at East Garston. He always wanted to win the Grand National, and in 1984 his horse Earthstopper came fifth but collapsed afterwards.

== Personal life ==
Kindersley was married twice, firstly in 1956 to Margaret "Magsie" Diana, daughter of the actor Hugh Wakefield, for nearly 20 years. They had two sons and two daughters, including the novelist Tania Kindersley. He was then married to Philippa Harper, from 1976 until his death. They had two sons.

His friends included Peter Cook, Dudley Moore, Peter O'Toole, Albert Finney, Queen Elizabeth the Queen Mother, and Lord Oaksey. His lovers included Ann, Marchioness of Queensberry, and zither player Shirley Abicair. He admitted, "I've got this infidelity thing, I've always had to be chasing."

His "engaging naivety" shows in an incident at London's Savoy Hotel in 1985 at a lunch for the Australian cricket team, when he introduced himself and his guest Graham Lord with the words, "Hallo, folks, I'm Gay and this is my friend Graham". One of the cricketers said, "Jeez! Backs to the wall, mate". Recounting the story later, Kindersley was "completely bewildered when everyone roared with laughter".

Kindersley died on 21 April 2011, aged 80, and was survived by four of his children from his first marriage, both from his second, and by both his wives. A biography, Flings Over Fences, was written by Robin Rhoderick-Jones and published by Quiller Press in 1997.
