= Maureen Constance Guinness =

Anglo-Irish socialite (1907–1998)

The Most Honourable The Marchioness of Dufferin
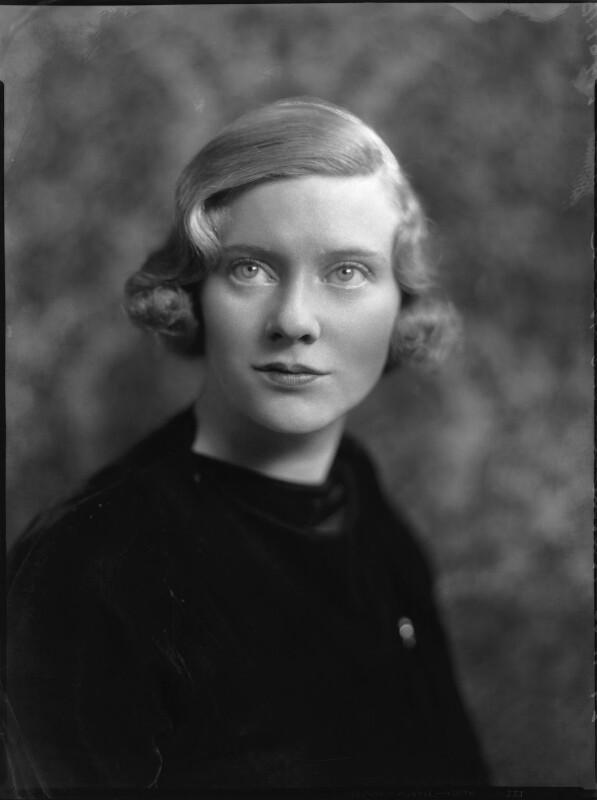
- Guinness in 1933
- Born: Maureen Constance Guinness; 31 January 1907; Grosvenor Place, London, England
- Died: 3 May 1998 (aged 91); London, England
- Other name: Maureen Constance Hamilton-Temple-Blackwood
- Spouses: Basil Hamilton-Temple-Blackwood, 4th Marquess of Dufferin and Ava (m. 1930; died 1945) Desmond Buchanan (m. 1948; div. 1954) John Maude (m. 1955; died 1986)
- Children: 3, including Caroline and Sheridan
- Father: Ernest Guinness
- Relatives: Aileen Plunket (sister); Oonagh Guinness (sister); Sir George Russell, 4th Baronet (grandfather); Edward Guinness, 1st Earl of Iveagh (grandfather)
- Family: Guinness

Maureen Constance Hamilton-Temple-Blackwood, Marchioness of Dufferin (née Guinness; 31 January 1907 – 3 May 1998) was an Anglo-Irish socialite, known as one of the "Guinness Golden Girls". Through her first marriage to Basil Hamilton-Temple-Blackwood she held the title of Marchioness of Dufferin and Ava between 1930 and 1948. After being widowed, she remarried.

== Early life and family ==
Maureen Constance Guinness was born in 17 Grosvenor Place (now the Irish Embassy) in London on 31 January 1907. She was the second daughter of Ernest Guinness and Marie Clothilde Russell (Cloè) (1880–1953), daughter of Sir George Russell, 4th Baronet. Together with her elder sister Aileen and her younger sister Oonagh, the three Guinness sisters were known as the "Golden Guinness Girls". Guinness attended a finishing school in Paris, and went on a worldwide tour on her father's yacht called the Fantome with her parents and sisters after which she was debuted in society in 1925. She became known as the most extroverted, flamboyant, and most photographed of the three sisters. She was a well known friend of Baby and Zita Jungman (her cousins through marriage). She married Basil Hamilton-Temple-Blackwood, 4th Marquess of Dufferin and Ava on 3 July 1930 at St Margaret's, Westminster. Her father-in-law died while the couple were on honeymoon, leaving her husband his title and Clandeboye Estate, near Belfast. They had three children, Perdita, Caroline, and Sheridan.

== Public life ==
Guinness and her husband divided their time between London and Clandeboye, living at 4 Hans Crescent, Knightsbridge in London. Guinness preferred London, but would throw large parties at Clandeboye, where she was known for her practical jokes. Her husband was killed in 1945 in Burma during World War II, leaving Guinness widowed with three young children. He left the estate heavily mortgaged due to gambling debts, but Guinness had the money to redeem it, buying the estate for £192,000. She then created the Clandeboye estate company, similar to the Iveagh Trust. On 14 September 1948, she married Major Desmond Buchanan, a former army officer and antiques dealer. They divorced in 1954, after which she married Judge John Maude on 20 August 1955. They lived largely apart for a number of years, and Guinness continued to use her title from her first marriage.

Guinness was known for her unusual sense of fashion, and is believed to have provided inspiration for Barry Humphries’ character Dame Edna Everage and Osbert Lancaster's Maudie Littlehampton in The Daily Express. After the death of her father in 1949, she and a cousin became the first women to sit on the board of the Guinness Brewery.

She later became active in charitable work, raising £50,000 between 1958 and 1965 to build the Horder centre for arthritics as well as donating the site in Sussex. She stood down from this committee due to a disagreement, but she later opened Maureen's Oast House in 1996, as a holiday home for arthritics on her Kent estate.

Upon his marriage, she presented Clandeboye to her only son, Sheridan, in 1966. She gave all her children generous annuities, but was noted as less maternal than her sister Oonagh. Her daughter Caroline once commented that her childhood was too painful to recount, and her eldest daughter Perdita stated that all her mother wished to talk about was her glory days in London society. Her daughters and daughter-in-law unsuccessfully contested in court Guinness's passing of assets worth £15 million directly to her two grandchildren in 1995.

She died on 3 May 1998 in London. She is buried at Clandeboye with her son, who predeceased her.

== In popular culture ==
In the 2021 mini-series A Very British Scandal, Guinness was played by Julia Davis.
