= Tara Browne =

Irish socialite (1945-1966)

The Honourable Tara Browne
- Born: 4 March 1945; Dublin, Ireland
- Died: 18 December 1966 (aged 21); London, England
- Resting place: Luggala, County Wicklow, Ireland
- Occupation: Socialite
- Spouse: Noreen MacSherry (m. 1963)
- Partner: Suki Potier
- Children: 2
- Parents: The 4th Baron Oranmore and Browne (father); Oonagh Guinness (mother)
- Relatives: Garech Browne (brother)

Tara Browne (4 March 1945 – 18 December 1966) was an Irish socialite and heir to a part of the Guinness fortune. His December 1966 death in a car crash was referred to in the Beatles' song "A Day in the Life".

== Early life ==
Browne was the younger son of the 4th Baron Oranmore and Browne, who was also the 2nd Baron Mereworth, and Oonagh Guinness. His father, Lord Oranmore and Browne, was an Anglo-Irish peer and member of the House of Lords who served in that house for 72 years, longer than any other peer up to that time (ending only by eviction during government reforms in 1999). His mother, Oonagh Guinness, was an heiress to the Guinness fortune.

Browne was a member of Swinging London's counterculture of the 1960s and had stood to inherit £1 million at age 25. In August 1963, at age 18, he married Noreen "Nicky" MacSherry; the couple had two sons, Dorian (born 1963) and Julian (born 1965).

Browne facilitated his friend Paul McCartney's first LSD trip, either in November 1965 or early 1966, at Browne's home in Belgravia.

For his 21st birthday, Browne threw a "lavish" party at Luggala, the Gothic Browne family seat in the Wicklow Mountains, where "two private jets flew the 200 or so guests to Ireland, including John Paul Getty, Mick Jagger, Brian Jones [and] Jones' then-girlfriend Anita Pallenberg."

Browne's life was captured in Paul Howard's biography I Read the News Today, Oh Boy, published in 2016.

== Death ==
On 17 December 1966, Browne was driving with his girlfriend, model Suki Potier, in his Lotus Elan through South Kensington at high speed (some reports suggesting in excess of 106 mph (171 km/h). Potier, however, told an inquest that Tara drove "not very fast" down Earls Court Road into Redcliffe Gardens. Browne proceeded through the junction of Redcliffe Gardens and Redcliffe Square, colliding with a parked lorry. He died of his injuries the following day. Potier told the inquest: "Suddenly I saw this white car coming at the crossroads." Potier claimed that Browne swerved the car to absorb the impact of the crash to save her life. "There would have been a collision with the white car if Tara had not swerved – and I think I would have been killed." At the inquest, pathologist Dr. Donald Teare said that Browne had drunk only from half-a-pint to a pint of beer. The inquest jury gave a verdict of accidental death.

Browne's body was brought back to Ireland and buried on the Guinness family's Luggala Estate. His grave is one of three situated on the shore of Lough Tay, next to an ornamental building known as the Temple; the two other people buried there are his unnamed baby brother, who was born and died in December 1943, and his half-sister.

Following his death, his estranged wife launched a public legal battle for custody of their two young children; Browne's mother also sought custody. A judge eventually ruled that the boys should live with their grandmother.

== "A Day in the Life" ==
The death of Browne may have inspired some of the lyrics of the song "A Day in the Life" by the Beatles, which was released on their 1967 album Sgt. Pepper's Lonely Hearts Club Band. In a 1980 interview with Playboy magazine, John Lennon said, "I was reading the paper one day [...] the Guinness heir who killed himself in a car. That was the main headline story. He died in London in a car crash." Lennon, who was a friend of Browne, read the coroner's verdict into Browne's death while composing music at his piano. It was this news which inspired him to write the following lines:

He blew his mind out in a car
He didn't notice that the lights had changed
A crowd of people stood and stared
They'd seen his face before
Nobody was really sure
If he was from the House of Lords

However, in 1997, Paul McCartney gave a different explanation of these lines:

The verse about the politician blowing his mind out in a car we wrote together. It has been attributed to Tara Browne, the Guinness heir, which I don't believe is the case; certainly as we were writing it, I was not attributing it to Tara in my head. In John's head it might have been. In my head I was imagining a politician bombed out on drugs who'd stopped at some traffic lights and didn't notice that the lights had changed. The "blew his mind" was purely a drugs reference, nothing to do with a car crash.

Browne's death also inspired a song by the Pretty Things, "Death of a Socialite", which appears on the album Emotions, released in April 1967 (about one month before Sgt. Pepper's Lonely Hearts Club Band).
