= Sheridan Hamilton-Temple-Blackwood, 5th Marquess of Dufferin and Ava =

British nobleman

The Most Honourable The Marquess of Dufferin and Ava
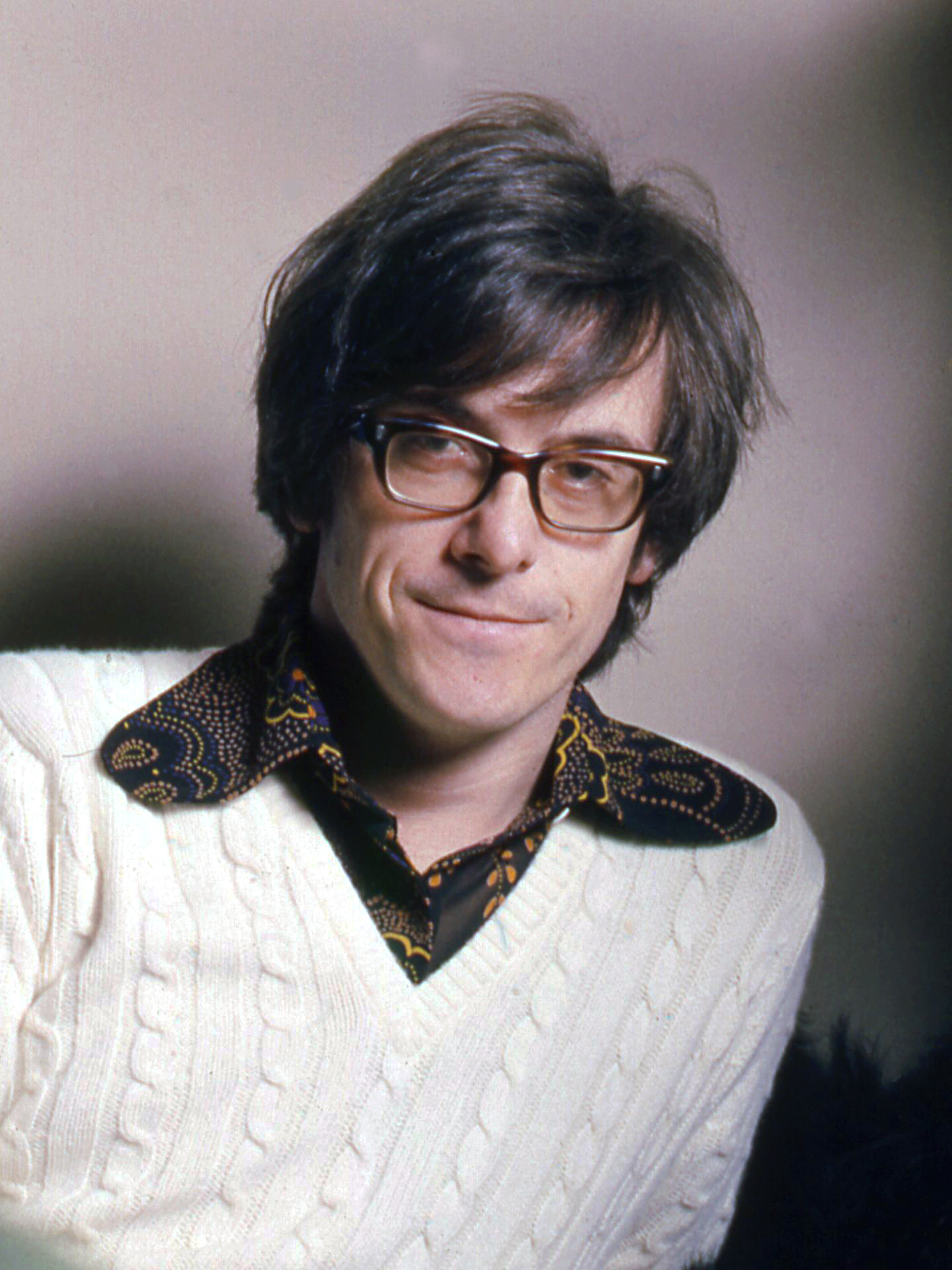
- Dufferin in 1975
- Other names: Sheridan Dufferin
- Born: Sheridan Frederick Terence Hamilton-Temple-Blackwood; 9 July 1938; Chelsea, London, England
- Died: 29 May 1988 (aged 49); Bangor, County Down, Northern Ireland
- Spouse: Lindy Guinness (m. 1964)
- Father: Basil Hamilton-Temple-Blackwood, 4th Marquess of Dufferin and Ava
- Mother: Maureen Guinness

Sheridan Frederick Terence Hamilton-Temple-Blackwood, 5th Marquess of Dufferin and Ava (9 July 1938 – 29 May 1988) was a British patron of the arts. Less formally, he was usually called Sheridan Dufferin.

== Childhood and inheritance ==
Born into an Anglo-Irish aristocratic family from Ulster, he was the youngest child and only son of Basil Hamilton-Temple-Blackwood, 4th Marquess of Dufferin and Ava and his wife Maureen Guinness (daughter of The Honourable Arthur Ernest Guinness, second son of Edward Guinness, 1st Earl of Iveagh). One of his sisters was the novelist Lady Caroline Blackwood.

Named after his playwright ancestor Richard Brinsley Sheridan, Lord Dufferin was known by his father's courtesy title Earl of Ava until he succeeded his father in the marquessate in 1945, when he was only six years old. When he was aged 12, trustees acting in his name sold Clandeboye, his ancestral seat, to his estates' company for £120,000 in order "to maintain his station in life", as the trustees allegedly said at the time.

After attending the day school Garth House in Bangor, County Down, he went to Eton College. After Eton, he attended Christ Church, Oxford. A keen shot and sportsman, he played championship tennis at the Queen's Club, but it was at Oxford that he developed a passion for the arts.

== Patron of the arts ==
After Oxford, he met and went into partnership with John Kasmin, and opened the Kasmin Gallery on New Bond Street, London in 1963. The Kasmin was a radical gallery for the time and showed British and American abstract and pop art. The gallery was described as "a beautiful space in New Bond Street designed for them by Ahrends, Burton and Koralek, with a curiously shaped white ceiling, white walls and a green-khaki rubberised floor. It was a space described by Kasmin as 'a machine for looking at pictures in'; those pictures, moreover, were prototypes of the new art. They looked as if they had been painted to be seen in museums: the space was designed for canvasses six feet square and upwards that would readily carry across a large room. The gallery thereby affirmed that painting had changed fundamentally: it was no longer being made to fit into drawing rooms." Among the artists the gallery showed were Frank Stella, Kenneth Noland, Jules Olitski, Anthony Caro and most famously David Hockney. The Kasmin Gallery closed in 1972, with Kasmin going on to work in partnership with other London dealers up to the 1990s.

Lord Dufferin was appointed a trustee of the Wallace Collection in 1973, and was also a trustee of the National Gallery, London and continued to support up-and-coming contemporary British artists. He also helped in the making of films about the pianist Liberace and the Playboy entrepreneur Hugh Hefner, as well as backing the controversial 1976 film Sebastiane, directed by the British filmmaker Derek Jarman. He was also a sometime director of the Guinness company, being a great-grandson of Edward Guinness, 1st Earl of Iveagh.

== Personal life ==
Although he was homosexual, in 1964 Lord Dufferin married his fourth cousin Lindy Guinness. Their wedding was at Westminster Abbey where 1,800 guests attended, including Princess Margaret and the Earl of Snowdon. Lady Dufferin was also passionate about art and together they were at the centre of the trendy art scene in late 1960s London. Parties at their house in Holland Park "were legendary in the late 1960s. You would find yourself talking to Princess Margaret or Duncan Grant and Angelica Garnett, or Francis Bacon or Stephen Spender or the Queen Mother."

== Legacy ==
Lord Dufferin died on 29 May 1988 from an AIDS-related illness, aged 49. As there were no other living descendants in the direct male line from the 1st Marquess, the marquessate and the other peerages created for the 1st Marquess in the Peerage of the United Kingdom became extinct. The Barony of Dufferin and Claneboye, the family's older title in the Peerage of Ireland, passed to a distant kinsman Sir Francis Blackwood, 7th Baronet who became the 10th Baron Dufferin and Claneboye.

His sister married Robert Lowell in 1972, and they named their son Sheridan after his uncle.

In the years immediately before, and especially after, her husband's death, Lady Dufferin developed new initiatives at Clandeboye, and today the estate has associations with a number of environmental organisations and projects, being a home for Conservation Volunteers Northern Ireland's biodiversity projects, training centre and tree nursery (in the old walled garden). The Northern Ireland branch of the Woodland Trust was established in 1998 in partnership with the Dufferin Foundation, and Royal Botanic Gardens, Kew have developed a blossoming relationship with Clandeboye since 2003. Lady Dufferin also returned to the art world and exhibited in galleries in London and New York under the name Lindy Guinness. She was also the inspiration behind the opening of the Ava Gallery at Clandeboye in 2004, which exhibits works by leading contemporary Northern Irish artists and an annual exhibition of museum-standard work by a major artist or group of artists.

== Coat of arms ==
Coat of arms of Sheridan Hamilton-Temple-Blackwood, 5th Marquess of Dufferin and Ava
Coronet A coronet of a marquess Crest 1st: On a Cap of Maintenance Gules turned up Ermine a Crescent Argent (Blackwood); 2nd, On a Ducal Coronet Or a Martlet Gold (Temple); 3rd, a Demi-Antelope affrontée Ermine attired and unguled Or holding between his hoofs a Heart Gules (Hamilton, Earl of Clanbrassill) Escutcheon Quarterly, 1st and 4th, Azure a Fess Or in chief a Crescent Argent between two Mullets of the second and in base a Mascle of the third (Blackwood); 2nd, quarterly, 1st and 4th, Or an Eagle displayed Sable, 2nd and 3rd, Argent two Bars Sable each charged with three Martlets Or (Temple); 3rd, Gules three Cinquefoils pierced Ermine on a Chief Or a Lion passant of the field (Hamilton, Earl of Clanbrassill) Supporters Dexter: a Lion Gules armed and langued Azure gorged with a Tressure flory-counterflory Or; Sinister: an Heraldic Tiger Ermine gorged with a like Tressure Gules; each supporter supporting a Flag Staff proper therefrom flowing a Banner Or charged with a Peacock in his Pride also proper Motto Per vias rectas (By straight ways)

Peerage of Ireland
Preceded by Basil Hamilton-Temple-Blackwood	Baron Dufferin and Claneboye; 1945–1988	Succeeded by Francis George Blackwood
Peerage of the United Kingdom
Preceded by Basil Hamilton-Temple-Blackwood	Marquess of Dufferin and Ava; 1945–1988	Extinct
