= Israel Citkowitz =

American pianist, composer, teacher, critic and poet (1909–1974)

- Born: Israel Citkowitz; 6 February 1909; Skierniewice, Congress Poland, Russian Empire
- Died: 4 May 1974 (aged 65); Westminster, London, England
- Occupations: Pianist, composer, teacher, critic
- Years active: 1927–1974
- Spouses: Helen Margaret Simon (m. 1935; div. 1948) Lady Caroline Blackwood (m. 1959; div. 1972)
- Children: 4, including Eugenia

Israel Citkowitz (6 February 1909 – 4 May 1974) was a Polish-born American pianist, composer, teacher, and critic.

== Early life ==
Israel Citkowitz was born on 6 February 1909 into a Jewish family in Skierniewice, Poland, the first of two children to Ida Frankon and Abraham Citkowitz. He was brought to the United States when he was three. Citkowitz had a sister, Rebecca.

As a teenager, Citkowitz studied composition with Aaron Copland and Roger Sessions. He later traveled to Paris where he studied counterpoint with Nadia Boulanger.

== Career ==
From 1927 to 1929, Citkowitz was a member of Shakespeare and Company.

During the 1930s, Citkowitz published music criticism in Modern Music and Musical Mercury. Among his pieces was the first English-language introduction to Schenker's ideas, The Role of Heinrich Schenker.

In 1939, Citkowitz was appointed teacher of counterpoint and composition, which included Song Cycle to Words of Joyce, String Quartet and the choral music, The Lamb, at the Dalcroze School of Music in New York City. Among his students were the English composer Leo Smith, and later, the American conductor Richard Kapp.

Citkowitz wrote poetry including Autumn and The Prodigals of Summer.

=== Discography ===
- But Yesterday Is Not Today (1977). New World Records — NW 243
- Modern America Art Songs (Unknown). New Editions (2) — NE 2

== Personal life ==
On 15 September 1935, Citkowitz married Helen Margaret Simon in Manhattan, New York. They had two children. The couple divorced in 1948.

After his 1948 divorce, Citkowitz lived in his Carnegie Hall studio.

On 15 August 1959, Citkowitz married the English writer and heir to the Guinness beer fortune, Lady Caroline Blackwood, 22 years his junior. They had three daughters: Natalya, Eugenia, and Ivana, born after they separated. The couple divorced in 1972. A deathbed admission by Blackwood revealed that their daughter Ivana Lowell was not Citkowitz's child, but was fathered by her lover, screenwriter Ivan Moffat. On 22 June 1978, Natalya, Citkowitz's eldest daughter with Blackwood, died at age 17 from postural asphyxia due to a drug overdose.

== Death ==
Citkowitz died on 4 May 1974 at his apartment in Westminster, London, where he had been living for the preceding five years. He was 65.
