= Flora Curzon, Lady Howe =

American heiress and singer

The Right Honourable The Countess Howe
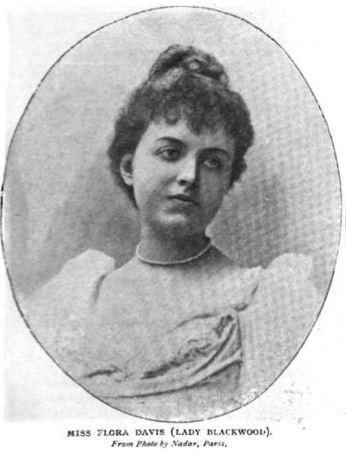
- Photo by Nadar, Paris, 1894

Personal details
- Born: Florence Hamilton Davis; 27 January 1870 New York City, U.S.
- Died: 15 April 1925 (aged 55) Amersham, Buckinghamshire
- Spouse(s): Terence Hamilton-Temple-Blackwood, 2nd Marquess of Dufferin and Ava (m. 1893; died 1918) Richard Curzon, 4th Earl Howe (m. 1919)
- Children: 3
- Parent(s): John Hagy Davis; Florence Chapman Davis
- Known for: Lady Terence Blackwood; Marchioness of Dufferin and Ava

Flora Curzon, Lady Howe (born Florence Hamilton Davis; January 27, 1870 – April 15, 1925), was an American heiress and singer who twice married into the British aristocracy.

== Early life ==
Florence Hamilton Davis was born in New York City around 1865. Flora, as she was known, was the daughter of Bellevue, Ohio-born Florence (née Chapman) Davis and John Hagy Davis, a Wall Street banker with John H. Davis & Co., located at 10 Wall Street. She grew up at 24 Washington Square North in New York. Her half-brother, John Ethelbert Davis (1900–1966), was married to Maude Reppelin Bouvier, a daughter of John Vernou Bouvier Jr. and sister of Edith Ewing Bouvier Beale (of Grey Gardens infamy) and John Vernou Bouvier III (father of First Lady Jacqueline Kennedy Onassis and Princess Lee Radziwill).

In 1898, her father, who was as "conspicuous in society as he [wa]s in Wall Street," married for the third time, out of four overall, to South African born Mary Ethel Jackson, a friend of Flora's who was about thirty-three years his junior.

== Singing career ==
In December 1910, Lady Dufferin, a singer, made her public debut at Bechstein Hall in London. She appeared in a concert arranged by Mme. d'Onalda, but did not accept a fee. Lady Dufferin possessed a "charming soprano voice, and has had training in Paris and elsewhere. When her husband, then Lord Terence Blackwood, was Secretary to the British Embassy at Paris, she frequently sang in private salons in the cause of charity."

== Personal life ==
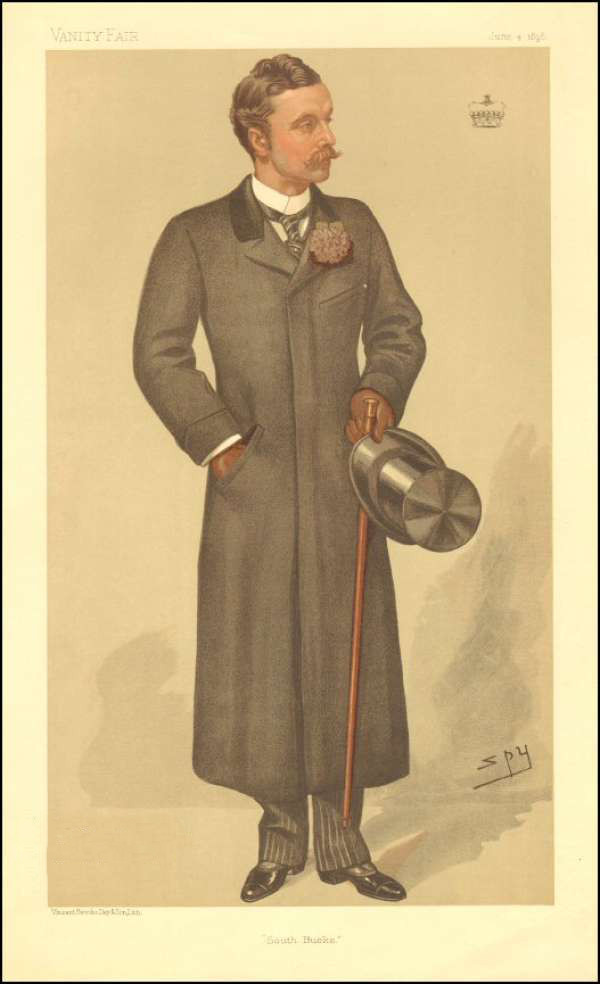
A caricature of her second husband by "Spy" (Leslie Ward) published in Vanity Fair in 1896.

On October 16, 1893, Flora was married to Lord Terence Blackwood at the English Church of the Holy Trinity in the Avenue de l'Alma in Paris. He was the second son of Frederick Hamilton-Temple-Blackwood, 1st Marquess of Dufferin and Ava, and his wife Hariot. His father was Governor General of Canada of in the 1870s and Viceroy and Governor-General of India in the 1880s, and his mother was known for leading an initiative to improve medical care for women in British India. They spent their honeymoon at Walmer Castle, which is one of Lord Dufferin's residences by virtue of his position as Lord Warden of the Cinque Ports.

During their marriage, Flora was "socially prominent in the American colony in London", and they were the parents of three daughters:

- Lady Doris Gwendoline Hamilton-Temple-Blackwood (1895–1984), who married Captain Cecil Bernard Gunston (1885–1934), of the Coldstream Guards, son of Major Bernard Gunston, formerly of the 5th Dragoon Guards, in 1922.
- Lady Ursula Florence Hamilton-Temple-Blackwood (1899–1982), who married Arthur Swithin Newton Horne, formerly of The King's Own Royal Border Regiment and Government Secretary of the Federated Malay States.
- Lady Patricia Ethel Hamilton-Temple-Blackwood (1902–1983), who married Henry Russell, the former director of the Boston Opera Company and the son of musician Henry Russell, in 1926.

During the Devonshire House Ball of 1897, then Lady Terence Blackwood, attended as Flora, Goddess of Flowers, and was photographed by Walker & Boutall. Her husband went as Captain Blackwood of the Royal Navy.

Upon the death of Terence's older brother Archibald, Earl of Ava, at the Siege of Ladysmith in the Second Boer War in 1900, he became the heir and assumed the courtesy title Earl of Ava himself before succeeding his father in 1902. Lord Dufferin died from pneumonia on 7 February 1918 and was buried at the Dufferin ancestral seat of Clandeboye, County Down.

In December 1919, nearly two years after Lord Dufferin's death, the Marchioness of Dufferin and Ava remarried to widower Richard Curzon, 4th Earl Howe, "one of the richest and most distinguished nobleman in England." Lord Howe was a son of Richard Curzon-Howe, 3rd Earl Howe, and the former Isabella Maria Katherine Anson (a daughter of Major-General the Hon. George Anson). His first wife was Lady Georgiana Spencer-Churchill, the fifth daughter of John Spencer-Churchill, 7th Duke of Marlborough, and his wife Lady Frances Vane. From his first marriage, he had one son, Francis, who became the 5th Earl Howe upon Lord Howe's death in 1929.

Lady Howe died of heart disease following influenza and pneumonia at Penn House, Amersham, Buckinghamshire, on 14 April 1925.

=== Descendants ===
Through her eldest daughter, she was the grandmother of Hermione Hamilton Gunston (b. 1923), who married Lt. Col. Sir Walter Luttrell, and Sonia Helen Gunston (b. 1926), appointed Temporary Lady of the Bedchamber to Queen Elizabeth II in 1967, and who married Thomas Fairfax, 13th Lord Fairfax of Cameron, and had issue, including Nicholas Fairfax, 14th Lord Fairfax of Cameron.
