= Sir Edward Ward, 1st Baronet, of Wilbraham Place =

Colonel Sir Edward Ward Bt GBE KCB KCVO
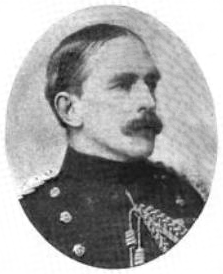
- In The Sketch, 6 March 1901
- Born: Edward Willis Duncan Ward; 17 December 1853; Oban, Scotland
- Died: 11 September 1928 (aged 74); Paris, France
- Spouse: Florence Caroline Simons (m. 1880)

Sir Edward Willis Duncan Ward, 1st Baronet (17 December 1853 – 11 September 1928) was a British Army officer and military administrator, serving as Permanent Secretary of the War Office. He was a notable reformer of army administration, improving efficiency of mobilization, medical services and supplies.

== Military career ==
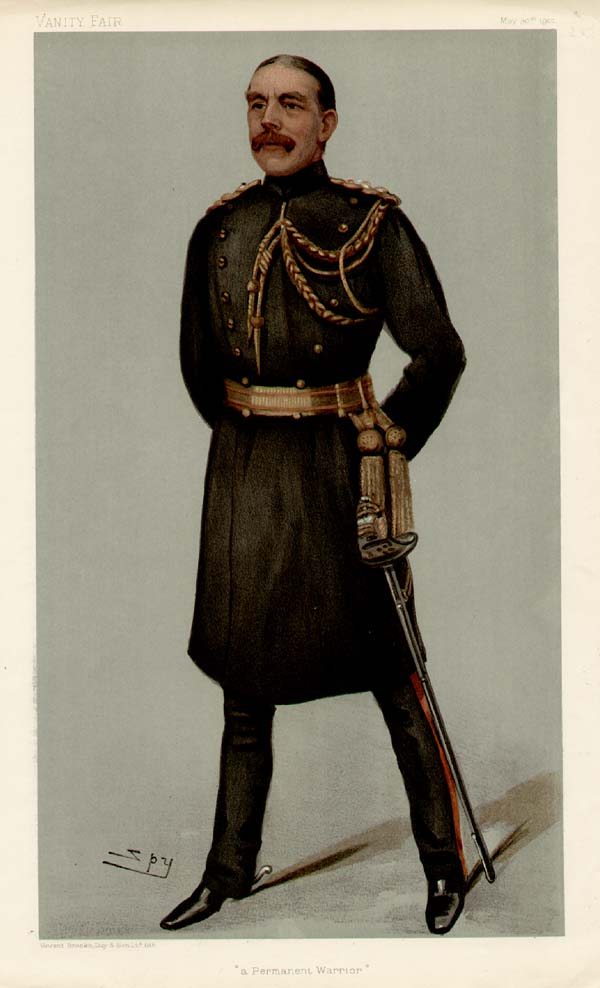
"A Permanent Warrior". Caricature by Spy published in Vanity Fair in 1901.

Ward was born in Oban, Argyllshire, Scotland in 1853, the only son of Lieutenant John Ward, RN, by his wife Mary Hope Bowie. He was commissioned sub-lieutenant in the 2nd Royal Lanarkshire Militia in December 1873, and transferred to the 2nd West India Regiment in February 1874. In April 1874 he transferred into the Control Department as a Sub-Assistant Commissary, transferring to the new Commissariat and Transport Department in 1875, although he did not resign his militia commission until December 1874. He was promoted Assistant Commissary in 1876. In January 1880 the department changed its name to the Commissariat and Transport Staff and Ward became a Deputy Assistant Commissary-General in the new organisation.

In April 1885 Commissariat and Transport Staff officers were given honorary military rank and Ward also became a captain. He was with Sir Garnet Wolseley's expedition up the Nile to recapture Khartoum. In December 1885 he was promoted to Assistant Commissary-General and major. In December 1888 the department underwent yet another change, becoming the Army Service Corps, with its officers now holding full military rank. He was promoted lieutenant-colonel in June 1890. He went on the Ashanti Expedition in West Africa in 1895–1896. Ward returned to England and was promoted to brevet colonel in March 1898.

=== Boer War ===
Ward sailed with the first ships to Cape Town Harbour in September 1899. After the Siege of Ladysmith, Sir George White called him 'the greatest supply officer since Moses'.

In 1900 while on campaign he was appointed Director of Supplies to the South African Field Force by Lord Roberts. Ward had begun life in the administration of military supplies. His organizational abilities were quickly discovered by after the chaotic state of affairs in 1899, the changes were most welcome. Lord Salisbury directed him to take up the position of Permanent Under-secretary at the War Office under Secretary St John Brodrick.

== Civil career ==
After retiring from the Army, Ward joined the staff of the War Office, becoming Permanent-under-Secretary. When war broke out in 1914, he was asked by Lord Kitchener what preparations needed to be made for the troops expected to arrive from various countries in the British Empire who would be camped on Salisbury Plain before being dispatched to the front line in Europe. Among Ward's suggestions was meeting the troops' needs for reading materials to be provided there. When the decision was taken, after the Ottoman Empire entered the war, to divert the ANZAC troops to Egypt, the original proposal was expanded and became what was known as the Camp's Library, which provided books and magazines to troops in base camps and Prisoner of War Camps in all the theatres of war. This was one of several voluntary organisations providing similar services, for example to troops in hospitals and convalescent centres. The scale and range of volunteering during the war and the range of services provided was unprecedented and became so chaotic that the government had to legislate to control it and appointed Ward as Director General of Voluntary Organisations in 1915.

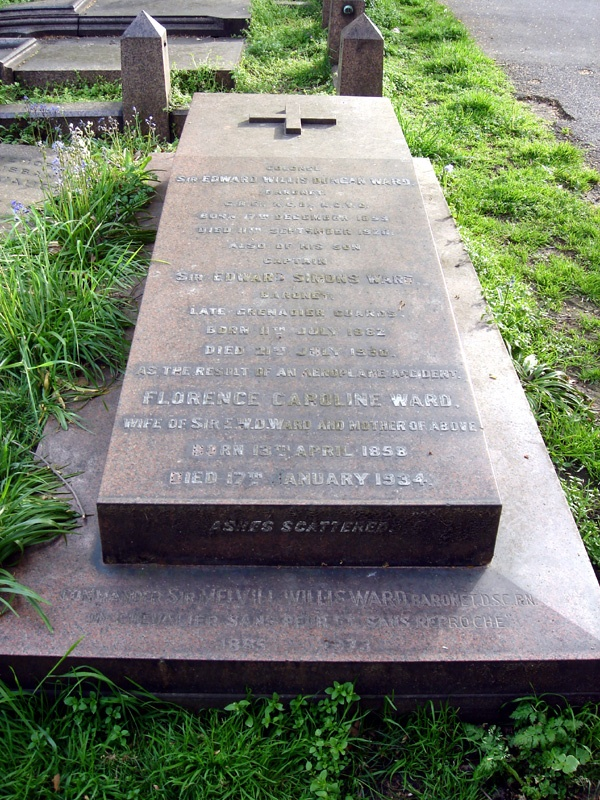
Funerary monument, Brompton Cemetery, London

In 1915, he was elevated to the baronetage as the 1st Baronet of Wilbraham Place. In 1919 he was appointed a Knight Grand Cross of the Order of the British Empire.

After the war, in retirement, Ward became Commander-in-Chief of the Special Constables, holding that office until 1925, and was a President of the Union Jack Club, and Chairman of the Royal Society for the Prevention of Cruelty to Animals

== Family ==
In 1880 he married Florence Caroline Simons (1858–1934). He died unexpectedly while visiting Paris.

He was succeeded in the baronetcy by his eldest son, Captain Edward Simons Ward (1882–1930). Together with Frederick Hamilton-Temple-Blackwood, 3rd Marquess of Dufferin and Ava and Viscountess Ednam, he died when their aeroplane returning to London from Le Touquet exploded in midair over Meopham, Kent. Captain Ward was succeeded in the baronetcy by his younger brother, Melvill Willis Ward (1885–1973), as the 3rd Baronet. The title became extinct on his brother's death.

== Decorations ==
- Companion of the Order of the Bath (CB) 1886
- Knight Commander of the Order of the Bath (KCB) 29 November 1900, in recognition of services in connection with the Campaign in South Africa 1899-1900
- Knight Commander of the Royal Victorian Order (KCVO) 1907
- Knight Grand Cross of the Order of the British Empire (GBE) 1919

Baronetage of the United Kingdom
New creation	Baronet (of Wilbraham Place); 1914–1928	Succeeded by Edward Simons Ward
