= Frederick Hamilton-Temple-Blackwood =

Frederick Hamilton-Temple-Blackwood may refer to:

- Frederick Hamilton-Temple-Blackwood, 1st Marquess of Dufferin and Ava (1826–1902), British public servant and society figure
- Frederick Hamilton-Temple-Blackwood, 3rd Marquess of Dufferin and Ava (1875–1930), British soldier and politician
