= Terence Hamilton-Temple-Blackwood, 2nd Marquess of Dufferin and Ava =

British diplomat

The Most Honourable The Marquess of Dufferin and Ava DL JP
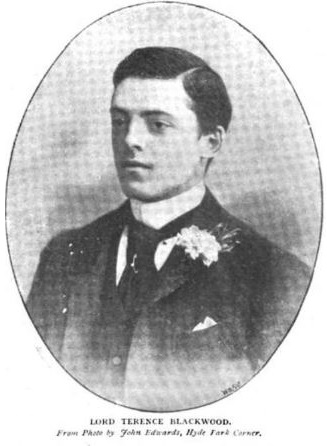
- From Photo by John Edwards, Hyde Park Corner, 1894

Personal details
- Born: Terence John Temple Hamilton-Temple-Blackwood; 16 March 1866
- Died: 7 February 1918 (aged 51) London, England
- Spouse: Florence "Flora" Davis (m. 1893)
- Children: 3
- Parent(s): Frederick Hamilton-Temple-Blackwood, 1st Marquess of Dufferin and Ava; Hariot Rowan-Hamilton
- Relatives: Basil Temple Blackwood (brother); Frederick Hamilton-Temple-Blackwood, 3rd Marquess of Dufferin and Ava (brother)

Terence John Temple Hamilton-Temple-Blackwood, 2nd Marquess of Dufferin and Ava DL JP (16 March 1866 – 7 February 1918), styled Lord Terence Blackwood between 1888 and 1900 and Earl of Ava between 1900 and 1902, was a British diplomat.

== Early life ==
Lord Dufferin was the second son of Frederick Hamilton-Temple-Blackwood, 1st Marquess of Dufferin and Ava and Hariot Hamilton-Temple-Blackwood, Marchioness of Dufferin and Ava. His father was Governor General of Canada of in the 1870s and Viceroy and Governor-General of India in the 1880s and his mother was known for leading an initiative to improve medical care for women in British India.

His paternal grandparents were Price Blackwood, 4th Baron Dufferin and Claneboye and Helen Blackwood, Baroness Dufferin and Claneboye (a granddaughter of the playwright Richard Brinsley Sheridan), members of the Ascendancy, Ireland's Anglo-Irish aristocracy. His maternal grandfather was Archibald Hamilton-Rowan of Killyleagh Castle (now Northern Ireland).

As a younger son, he was not expected to inherit the title, but on the death of his brother Archibald, Earl of Ava at the Siege of Ladysmith in the Second Boer War on 11 January 1900, he became the heir and assumed the courtesy title Earl of Ava himself before succeeding his father in 1902.

== Career ==
From 1891 to 1918, he worked as a clerk at the Foreign Office, Second Secretary of the Diplomatic Service and a Justice of the Peace and Deputy Lieutenant for County Down.

== Personal life ==
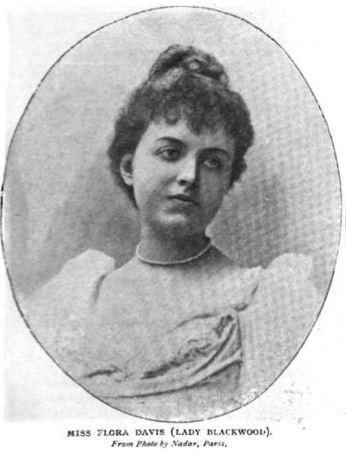
His wife, the former Flora Davis, in 1894.

Lord Dufferin married Florence "Flora" Davis, a rich American singer who was the daughter of New York banker John Hagy Davis, of 24 Washington Square, New York City, in 1893. Together, they were the parents of three daughters:

- Lady Doris Gwendoline Hamilton-Temple-Blackwood (1895–1984), who married Captain Cecil Bernard Gunston, MC (1885–1934) of the Coldstream Guards, son of Major Bernard Gunston, formerly of the 5th Dragoon Guards, on 19 October 1922.
- Lady Ursula Florence Hamilton-Temple-Blackwood (9 Feb 1899-13 Feb 1982), who married Arthur Swithin Newton Horne, formerly of The King's Own Royal Border Regiment and Government Secretary of the Federated Malay States (d. 1954).
- Lady Patricia Ethel Hamilton-Temple-Blackwood (1902–1983), who married Henry Russell, the former director of the Boston Opera Company and the son of musician Henry Russell, on 11 June 1926.

Lord Dufferin died from pneumonia on 7 February 1918 and was buried at the Dufferin ancestral seat of Clandeboye, County Down. The marquessate passed to his youngest brother, Lord Frederick Blackwood. Two years after his death his widow married again, to Richard George Penn Curzon, 4th Earl Howe, and died on 14 April 1925.

=== Descendants ===
Through his eldest daughter, he was the grandfather of Hermione Hamilton Gunston (b. 1923), who married Lt. Col. Sir Walter Luttrell MC, and Sonia Helen Gunston JP (b. 1926), appointed Temporary Lady of the Bedchamber to Queen Elizabeth II in 1967, and who married Thomas Fairfax, 13th Lord Fairfax of Cameron (d.1964) and had issue including Nicholas Fairfax, 14th Lord Fairfax of Cameron (b. 1956).

== Arms ==
Coat of arms of Terence Hamilton-Temple-Blackwood, 2nd Marquess of Dufferin and Ava
| Coronet A Coronet of an Marquess Crest 1st: On a Cap of Maintenance Gules turned up Ermine a Crescent Argent (Blackwood); 2nd, On a Ducal Coronet Or a Martlet Gold (Temple); 3rd, a Demi-Antelope affrontée Ermine attired and unguled Or holding between his hoofs a Heart Gules (Hamilton, Earl of Clanbrassill) Escutcheon Quarterly, 1st and 4th, Azure a Fess Or in chief a Crescent Argent between two Mullets of the second and in base a Mascle of the third (Blackwood); 2nd, quarterly, 1st and 4th, Or an Eagle displayed Sable, 2nd and 3rd, Argent two Bars Sable each charged with three Martlets Or (Temple); 3rd, Gules three Cinquefoils pierced Ermine on a Chief Or a Lion passant of the field (Hamilton, Earl of Clanbrassill) Supporters Dexter: a Lion Gules armed and langued Azure gorged with a Tressure flory-counterflory Or; Sinister: an Heraldic Tiger Ermine gorged with a like Tressure Gules; each supporter supporting a Flag Staff proper therefrom flowing a Banner Or charged with a Peacock in his Pride also proper Motto Per Vias Rectas (By straight ways) |

Peerage of the United Kingdom
| Preceded by Frederick Hamilton; Temple-Blackwood | Marquess of Dufferin and Ava; 1902–1918 | Succeeded by Frederick Hamilton; Temple-Blackwood |
