= Helen Munro Ferguson, Viscountess Novar =

President and founder of the Australian Red Cross (1865–1941)

The Right Honourable The Viscountess Novar GBE
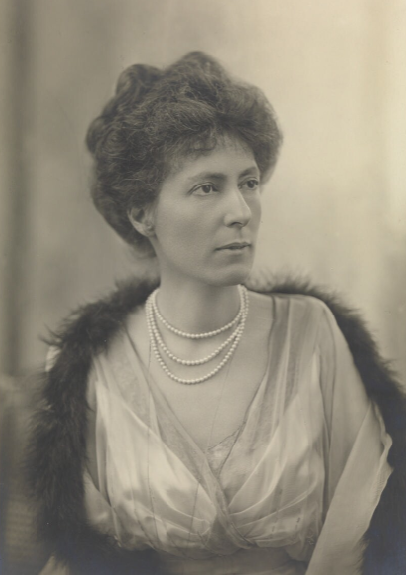
- Helen Ferguson (c. 1914–1918).
- Born: Helen Hermione Munro Hamilton-Temple-Blackwood; 14 March 1865
- Died: April 9, 1941 (aged 76)
- Organization(s): League of Red Cross Societies; British Red Cross
- Spouse: Ronald Munro Ferguson, 1st Viscount Novar
- Parents: Frederick Hamilton-Temple-Blackwood, 1st Marquess of Dufferin and Ava (father); Hariot Hamilton-Temple-Blackwood, Marchioness of Dufferin and Ava (mother)
- Family: Blackwood family

Helen Hermione Munro Ferguson, Viscountess Novar GBE (née Hamilton-Temple-Blackwood; 14 March 1865 – 9 April 1941) was a Red Cross leader, as well as an advocate for nursing and healthcare and political activist.

== Early life ==
Born Helen Hermione Munro Hamilton-Temple-Blackwood on 14 March 1865, she was the second child and eldest daughter of Frederick Temple Hamilton-Temple-Blackwood and his wife, Hariot.

Her ancestors migrated from Scotland to Ulster in the 17th century and belonged to the Protestant Ascendancy in Ireland. She grew up on the Clandeboye Estate, a large country estate in Bangor, County Down, Ireland. But since her father had many overseas posts, she spent a lot of her early life outside the UK.

== Marriage ==
On 31 August 1889, Blackwood married Ronald Munro Ferguson. They lived together in Kirkcaldy and Novar House in Scotland. Helen Street in Kirkcaldy, later Lady Helen Street, was named after her.

Lady Ferguson attended the House of Commons to watch her husband from the ladies' gallery. She also helped write and draft his parliamentary and later viceregal speeches.

== Charity work and activism ==
Munro Ferguson was a noted orator and speechwriter. Interested in district nursing, she was the president of her local nursing association for 50 years and supported the state registration of nurses.

She was involved in a number of women's groups, including the National Union of Women Workers and the YWCA. A Liberal Imperialist, he was involved with organisations such as the Victoria League, the British Women's Emigration Association, and the Scottish Women's Liberal Federation.

=== Nursing and the Red Cross movement ===
Munro Ferguson was most well known for her involvement in the Red Cross movement in Scotland, Australia, and internationally with the League of Red Cross Societies. In 1909, she was elected to the Scottish branch of the British Red Cross Society council and became the founding president of the Red Cross branch in Fife, and remained president from 1910 to 1914 and from 1922 until her death. She helped establish Red Cross branches, Voluntary Aid Detachments and the Territorial Force Nursing Service in Scotland.

Between 1914 and 1920, when her husband was the sixth Governor-General of Australia, Helen lived in Australia. When the First World War broke out, she helped to form a federated branch of the British Red Cross Society in Australia of which she was president, while the national executive and its central depot were established and run by the Australian government, run out of Government House, Melbourne, and encouraged the formation of divisions on the state level. She was chair of the executive central council and finance committee of the Australian Red Cross, much to the chagrin of some of the men on the committees, who displayed sexist attitudes. However, the organisation managed to raise almost £5 million during the war.

The Australian Red Cross was run by women under Munro Ferguson's leadership and the organisation became popular with many Australian women as a way for them to help the war effort. Many women formed local branches to help provide food and other essentials for Australian and European soldiers. In October 1918, Munro Ferguson was appointed Dame Grand Cross of the British Empire (GBE) for her war work with the Australian Red Cross.

After the war ended, Munro Ferguson said Australian women should not disband their Red Cross branches. She went back to Scotland in 1920 and became the Viscountess Novar when her husband became a peer in December 1920. She agreed to represent the Australian Red Cross on the board of governors of the League of Red Cross Societies, and promoted the work of the Australian Red Cross globally through its Junior Red Cross and work with disabled soldiers and convalescent homes. She was also appointed to the international advisory committee of the League's nursing home at Manchester Square in London.

== Later life ==
Novar was appointed a justice of the peace in July 1920. A Unionist and a member of the party's local association, she considered running for parliament in 1924. In 1927, the University of Edinburgh made her an honorary doctor of laws (LLD) by the University of Edinburgh in 1927.

Her husband, Lord Novar, died on 30 March 1934.

Novar died at Raith House, Kirkcaldy, on 9 April 1941 of coronary thrombosis. There was a private funeral and cremation in Edinburgh and a public funeral at Raith. Her ashes were later placed alongside those of her husband at a sandstone memorial, with the epitaph "In the service of others her life was spent". She has been seen as a prominent figure in a network of aristocratic women's imperial feminism and philanthropy that extended across the British Empire.
