= Hariot Hamilton-Temple-Blackwood, Marchioness of Dufferin and Ava =

British aristocrat and Vicereine of India

Her Excellency The Most Honourable The Marchioness of Dufferin and Ava VA CI DBE
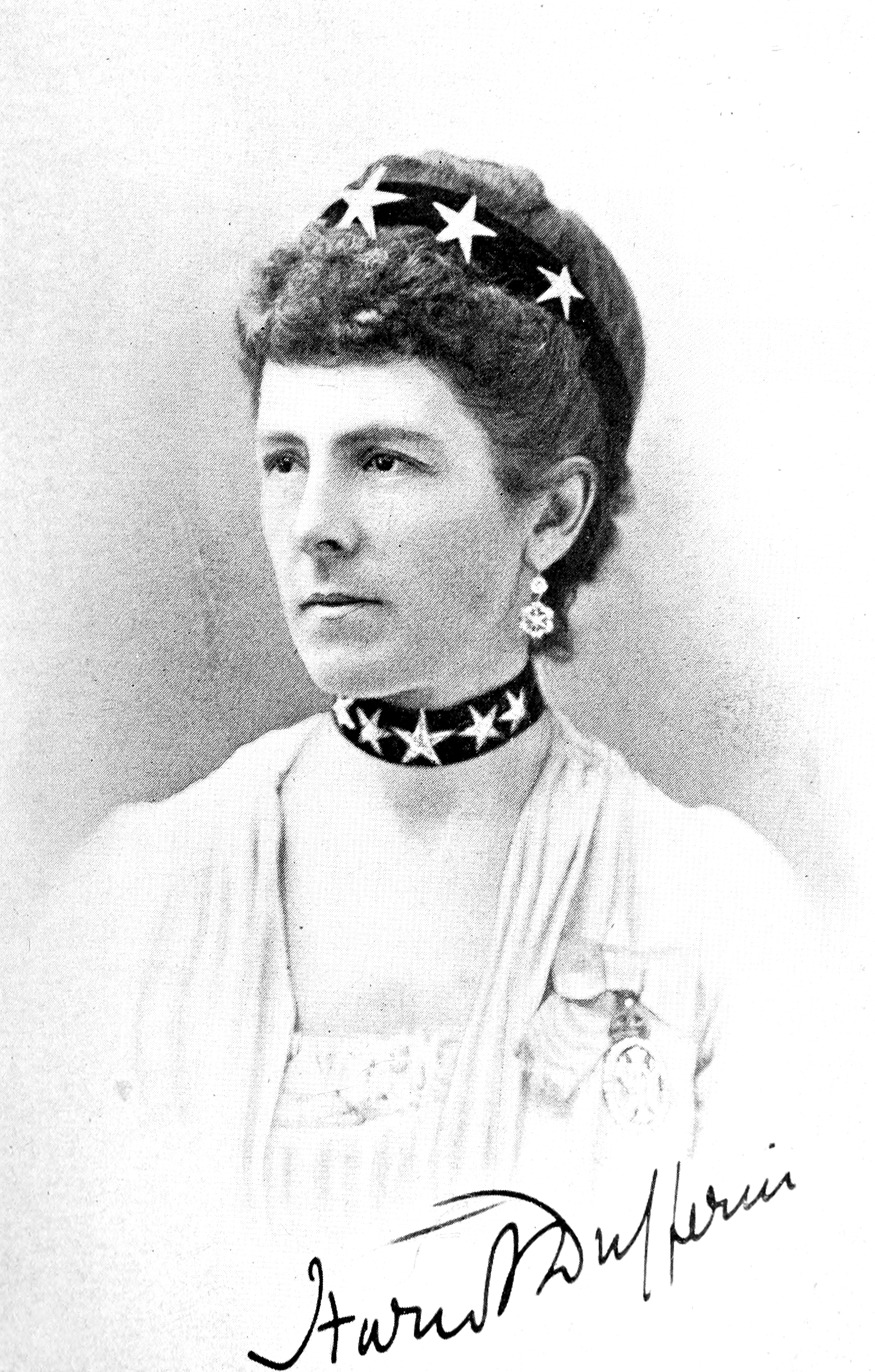
- The Marchioness of Dufferin and Ava

Viceregal-Consort of India
- In office 13 December 1884 – 10 December 1888
- Monarch: Queen Victoria
- Preceded by: The Marchioness of Ripon
- Succeeded by: The Marchioness of Lansdowne

Personal details
- Born: Hariot Georgina Rowan-Hamilton; 5 February 1843
- Died: 5 February 1936 (aged 93)
- Resting place: Clandeboye
- Spouse: Frederick Hamilton-Temple-Blackwood, 1st Marquess of Dufferin and Ava
- Children: Archibald Hamilton-Temple-Blackwood, Earl of Ava; Helen Hermione Munro Ferguson, Viscountess Novar; Terence Hamilton-Temple-Blackwood, 2nd Marquess of Dufferin and Ava; Lady Hermione Catherine Helen Hamilton-Temple-Blackwood; Lord Basil Hamilton-Temple-Blackwood; Alexandrina Plunket, Lady Plunket; Frederick Hamilton-Temple-Blackwood, 3rd Marquess of Dufferin and Ava
- Occupation: Writer, health care advocate

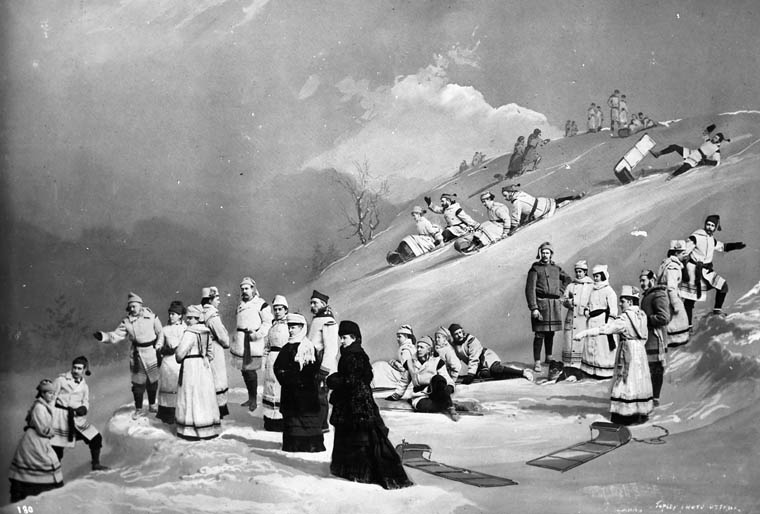
The Toboggan Party, Rideau Hall, illuminated composite photograph from Lady Dufferin's personal album. c. 1872–1875

Hariot Georgina Hamilton-Temple-Blackwood, Marchioness of Dufferin and Ava, VA, CI, DBE (née Rowan-Hamilton; 5 February 1843 – 25 October 1936) was a British aristocrat and Vicereine of India, known for her success in the role of "diplomatic wife," and for leading an initiative to improve medical care for women in British India.

== Biography ==
Born Hariot Georgina Rowan-Hamilton, she was the eldest of the 7 children of Archibald Hamilton-Rowan of Killyleagh Castle. On 23 October 1862, she married her distant cousin the 5th Baron Dufferin and Claneboye at Killyleagh Castle; they later had five daughters and seven sons.

Her husband was created Earl of Dufferin in 1871. A year later, she and their children travelled with him to Canada upon his appointment as Governor General, where her assistance in turning Rideau Hall into a centre of social activity included literary readings and presentation of plays in which she herself sometimes performed. Lady Dufferin was one of the most popular of the governor-generals' wives, and was starting to build up her reputation as "the most effective diplomatic wife of her generation". Next she joined him as he served as ambassador to Russia from 1879 to 1881, and to the Ottoman Empire from 1881 to 1884, where she received the Grand Crescent of the Ottoman Order of the Chefakat in 1883, followed by the Persian Order of the Sun in 1887. In both St. Petersburg and Constantinople, as at all their embassies, the couple were known for their hospitality.

=== Work in India ===
Lady Dufferin went with her husband to India in 1884 when he was appointed as the country's viceroy. Prior to her departure, she was asked by Queen Victoria to initiate a plan to improve the situation for women in India in illness and in child-bearing.

In 1885, having successfully canvassed for substantial donations from Indian princes such as the Maharajahs of Kashmir and Durbungha, Lady Dufferin, established a fund – the National Association for supplying Female Medical Aid to the Women of India (known as the Countess of Dufferin Fund).

Whilst there had been previous initiatives to provide Western medical care for women in India, Lady Dufferin's fund was the first to deliver a co-ordinated programme with official backing. The fund aimed to: provide medical tuition to doctors, hospital assistants, nurses and midwives; medical relief through dispensaries; female wards; female doctors; and female hospitals. The fund facilitated the provision of medical care for women by women in India, recognising the reticence amongst women of some cultural and religious affiliations, to seek care from male doctors. To this end, scholarships were set up to train Indian women in England, and also for English and European women who would promise to practice in India. Some of the early Indian women beneficiaries of this fund included: Kadambini Basu who entered medical college in 1883; Anandabai Joshi, and Rukhmabai.

As well as the numerous 'Lady Dufferin' hospitals and clinics which were established, some of which still exist under that name, there are medical colleges and midwifery schools named after her. This involved her in a great deal of fund-raising and is sometimes referred to as her fardone work; it was celebrated by Rudyard Kipling in his The Song of the Women.

The Countess of Dufferin fund was selected by the King in 1935 as one of the beneficiaries of the Indian Jubilee Fund. Lady Dufferin herself sent a contribution of £100 towards this fund which was earmarked for the renovation of the Dufferin Hospital in Calcutta.

Lady Dufferin received the Order of the Crown of India in 1884 and the Royal Order of Victoria and Albert in 1895.

=== Return to the UK ===
When the Earl's term in India ended in 1888, they travelled back to their home at Clandeboye in Ireland and her husband was elevated in the peerage as the Marquess of Dufferin and Ava that same year. He continued his ambassadorial career in Europe, and the Marchioness accompanied him to Italy and France. She published her memoirs, based on the letters she had written to her mother: Our Viceregal Life in India (1889) and My Canadian Journal (1891). They retired to Clandeboye in 1905.

After her husband died in 1902, she spent much of her time in a relatively modest house in Chelsea, London, economising when possible to help her sons as the family fortune had been depleted by sales of land and unwise investments. She wrote My Russian and Turkish Journals (1916) and was made a Dame Commander of the Order of the British Empire in 1917.

== Issue ==
The first Marchioness of Dufferin and Ava had seven children. None of her sons outlived her: Archibald was killed in the Second Boer War, Basil was killed in the First World War, Terence died of pneumonia, and her youngest, Frederick, was killed in a plane crash in 1930. She died in London in 1936 and was buried at Clandeboye.

- Archibald Hamilton-Temple-Blackwood, 2nd Earl of Ava (1863–1900)
- Lady Helen Hermione (1865–1941), married Ronald Munro Ferguson, 1st Viscount Novar
- Terence John Temple (1866–1919), married Florence Hamilton Davis.
- Lady Hermione Catherine Helen Hamilton-Temple-Blackwood (1869–1960)
- Lord Ian Basil Gawaine Temple Hamilton-Temple-Blackwood (1870–1917)
- Lady Victoria Alexandrina Hamilton-Temple-Blackwood (1873–1968), married firstly William Plunket, 5th Baron Plunket and had 8 children; married secondly Colonel Francis Powell Braithwaite
- Frederick Temple (1875–1930) married Brenda Woodhouse.
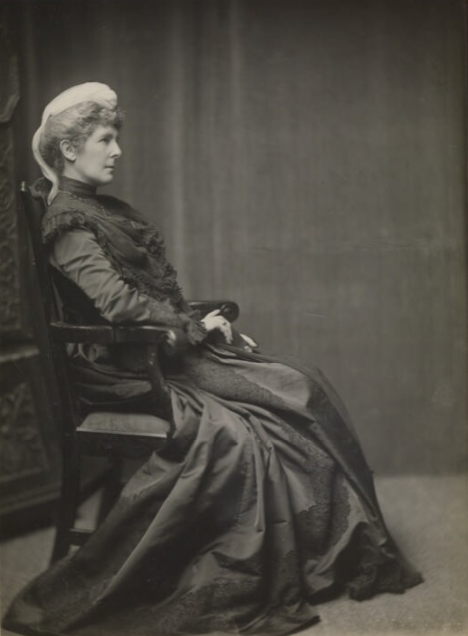
Dowager Marchioness of Dufferin and Ava during the First World War

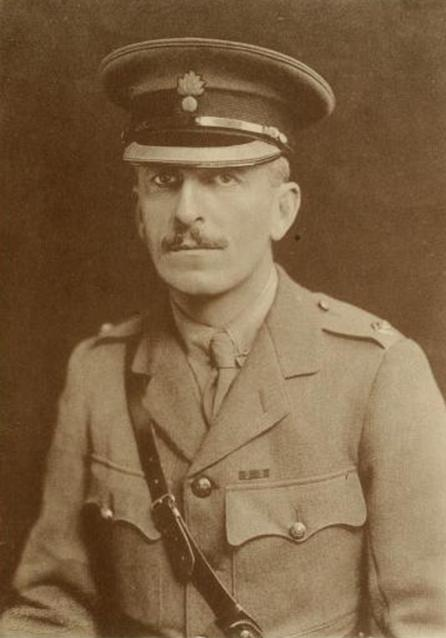
Her third son, Basil, in military uniform in 1916

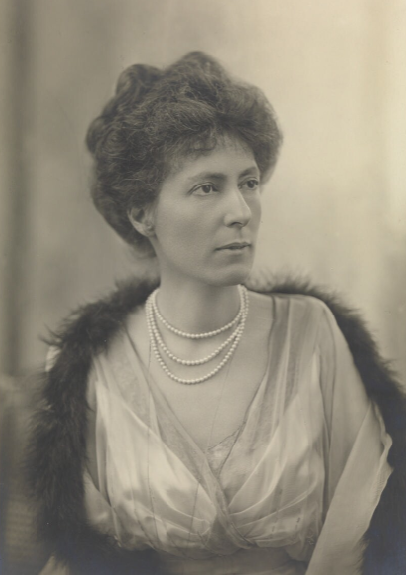
Her third daughter, Helen, during the First World War

== Legacy ==
Throughout colonial India, a number of hospitals were established under the patronage of Lady Dufferin, such as Lady Dufferin Hospital in Gola Ganj, Lucknow and Lady Dufferin Hospital in Karachi (now in Pakistan); these continue to operate in the present-day.

A Manitoba Historical Plaque was erected in Winnipeg, Manitoba by the province to commemorate her role as the wife of the Governor General of Canada, and thus in Manitoba's heritage.

== Sources ==
- Burke's Peerage & Gentry
- Oxford Dictionary of National Biography (2004)
- The Countess of Dufferin's Fund

Honorary titles
Preceded by The Lady Lisgar	Viceregal Consort of Canada; 1872–1878	Succeeded by Princess Louise, Marchioness of Lorne
Preceded by The Marchioness of Ripon	Viceregal Consort of India; 1884–1888	Succeeded by The Marchioness of Lansdowne
