= Henry Russell (impresario) =

English impresario, conductor, director and singing teacher

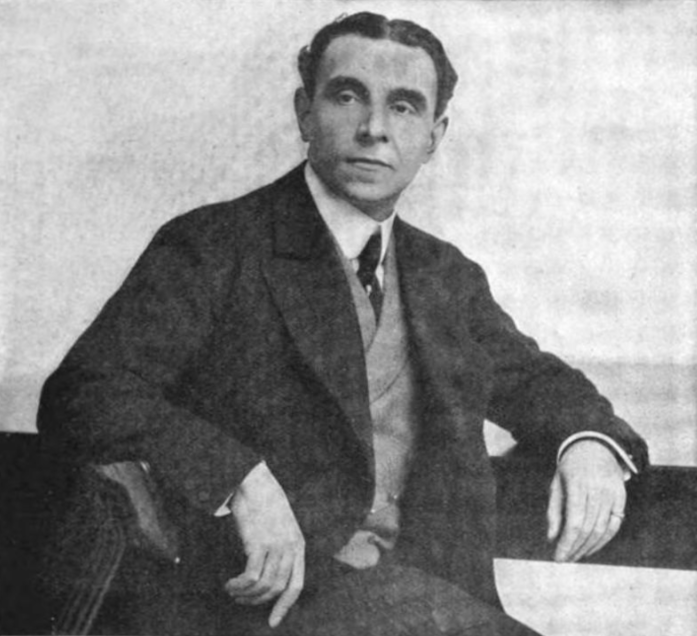
- Born: 14 November 1871; London, England
- Died: 11 October 1937 (aged 65); London, England
- Education: St Marylebone Grammar School
- Alma mater: Royal College of Music
- Spouses: Nina Hannah da Costa Andrade (m. 1895, divorced) Donna Shinn (div. 1926) Lady Patricia Hamilton-Temple-Blackwood (m. 1926)
- Parent(s): Henry Russell; Hannah de Lara
- Relatives: Sir Landon Ronald (brother); William C. Russell (half brother)

Henry Russell (14 November 1871 – 11 October 1937) was an English impresario, conductor, director, and singing teacher.

== Early life ==
Henry Ronald Russell was born in London, the son of Henry Russell, a composer, pianist, and baritone, and his partner (later wife) Hannah de Lara, an artist. He was the brother of the musician Sir Landon Ronald. From his father's first marriage to Isabella Lloyd, a member of the Lloyd banking family, he had two elder half brothers, novelist William Clark Russell and Anglican priest Henry Lloyd Russell.

He was educated at St Marylebone Grammar School. Russell was "first destined for medicine, but severe illness diverted him to music." After St Marylebone, he then pursued studies in singing at the Royal College of Music and conducting in Italy.

== Career ==
Russell began his career as a singing teacher, first in London (where Nellie Melba supplied him with his first singing pupils) and then in Rome. He then worked as a conductor at various opera houses in Italy. In 1904, he established the San Carlo Opera Company (SCOC), originally a touring arm of the Teatro di San Carlo of Naples, Italy. The company soon became its own institution and toured to the Royal Opera House, Covent Garden, London in late 1905. Russell and his company were responsible for presenting the whole 1905-1906 season at Covent Garden, and Russell directed or conducted all the productions.

After completing the season in London, Russell and the SCOC went to Boston in the United States in 1906. The group remained based in Boston and gave tours annually of mostly Italian operas throughout the United States from 1906-1909 in addition to giving performances in Boston. With the opening of the Boston Opera House in 1909, the company essentially became the seed for the newly formed Boston Opera Company (BOC), which Russell co-founded with the Bostonian millionaire Eben Jordan, Jr. He continued to direct the BOC until it went bankrupt in 1915.

After the BOC folded, Russell went to work for the Metropolitan Opera in New York as the company's associate director. He eventually returned to England, where he was involved in directing productions at the Waldorf Theatre in London. He also directed a season of operas at the Théâtre des Champs-Élysées in Paris.

== Personal life ==
Russell married three times, first to Portuguese singer Nina Hannah da Costa Andrade (b. 1870), daughter of the Marquis de Pombal, whom he married in 1895. Before their divorce, they were the parents of two children:

- Henry Tosti Russell (b. 1896), a reporter who interviewed the exiled Queen Victoria of Spain in 1936 about Edward VIII's relationship with Wallis Simpson.
- Sheridan William Robin Russell (1900–1991), a prominent cellist.

His second wife was fellow singer Donna Shinn (b. c. 1882), a collaborator of designer Natacha Rambova. They divorced and he married his third wife, actress Lady Patricia Ethel Hamilton-Temple-Blackwood (b. 1902) on 11 June 1926. Lady Patricia was the youngest of three daughters of Terence Hamilton-Temple-Blackwood, 2nd Marquess of Dufferin and Ava and his American wife, the former Flora Davis. A year before their marriage, Lady Patricia's mother remarried to Richard Curzon, 4th Earl Howe. There were no children of the second and third marriages.

Russell died at his home in London on 11 October 1937 at the age of 65.
