= Meopham air disaster =

1930 crash caused by tailplane failure

Coordinates: 51°21′36″N 0°21′36″E

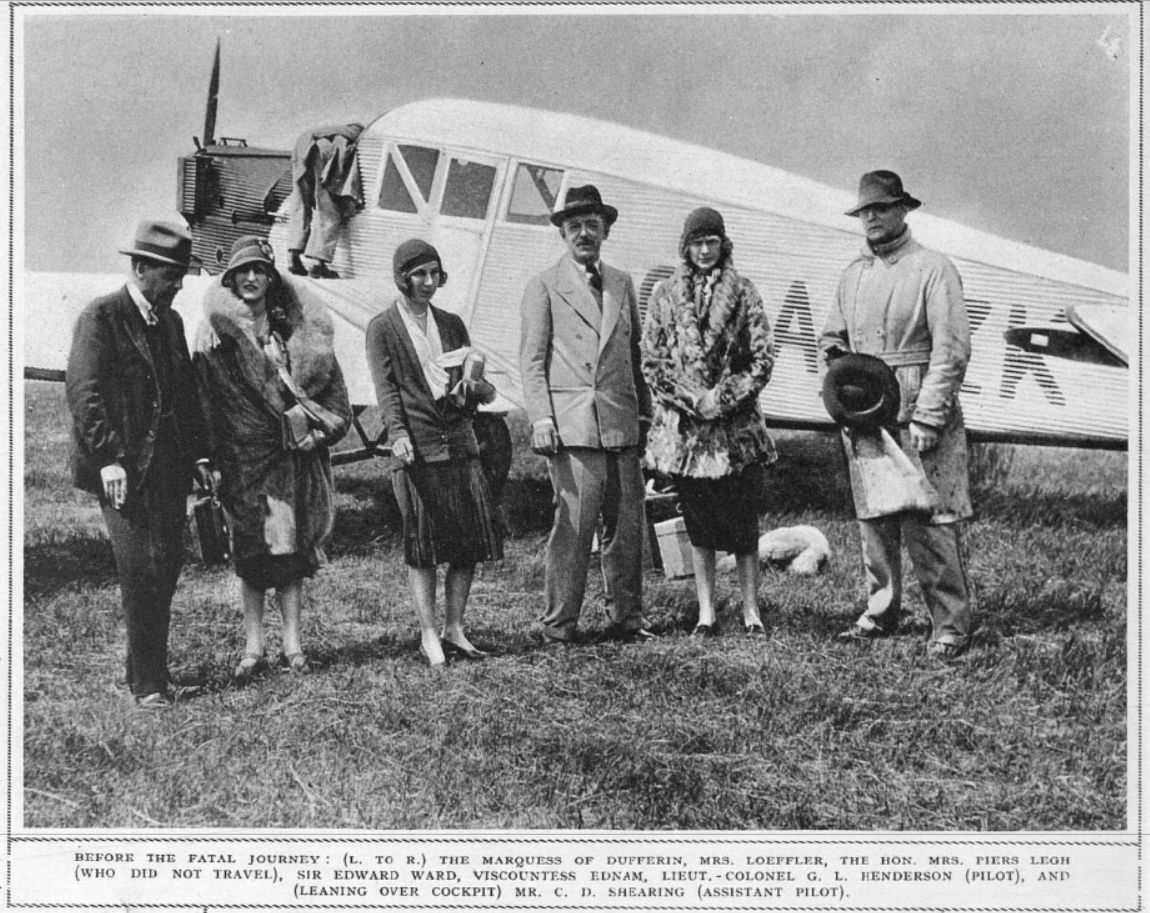
- The passengers and crew in front of the Junkers aircraft, just prior to the aircraft's departure on the fatal flight. Pictured L-R: The Marquess of Dufferin, Mrs Sigrid Loeffler, Mrs Sarah Legh (did not fly), Sir Edward Ward, Viscountess Ednam, George Henderson (pilot). Leaning over the aircraft in the background is the co-pilot Charles Shearing

Accident
- Date: 21 July 1930
- Summary: Mechanical failure of tailplane
- Site: near Meopham, Kent

Aircraft
- Aircraft type: Junkers F.13ge
- Operator: Walcot Air Line
- Registration: G-AAZK
- Flight origin: Le Touquet Airport, France
- Destination: Croydon Airport, England
- Passengers: 4
- Crew: 2
- Fatalities: 6
- Survivors: 0

The Meopham Air Disaster occurred on 21 July 1930 when a Junkers F.13ge flying from Le Touquet to Croydon with two crew and four passengers crashed near Meopham, Kent, with the loss of all on board. The report of the inquiry into the accident was made public, the first time in the United Kingdom that an accident report had been published.

== Aircraft ==
The aircraft involved was Junkers F.13ge G-AAZK, c/n 2052. The aircraft had been registered on 26 May 1930.

== Accident ==
The Junkers F.13ge registered G-AAZK, which was owned by the pilot Lieutenant-Colonel George Henderson, had been lent to the Walcot Air Line to operate a charter flight between Le Touquet in France and Croydon Airport south of London. As the aircraft was above Kent it appeared to have disintegrated and crashed near the village green at Meopham, five miles (8 km) south of Gravesend. Witnesses reported a rumbling noise just before the crash and that the aircraft emerged from a cloud and then broke apart in mid-air. The crash happened at 2:35 pm.

All the occupants except the pilot fell from the aircraft and ended up in an orchard, all of them dead. The fuselage and one wing of the aircraft crashed close to a bungalow, whilst the other wing was found one mile (1.6 km) away. The tail was found 300 yards (270 m) from the crash site in a field. The engine fell into the drive of an unoccupied house, just missing a gardener working nearby. One of the villagers rescued the co-pilot, Charles Shearing, from the wreckage and carried him into the bungalow. A retired surgeon who lived nearby was soon on the scene but Shearing died soon afterwards.

== Passengers ==
Lord Dufferin and Ava

The passengers were the Marquess of Dufferin and Ava, Viscountess Ednam (formerly Lady Rosemary Sutherland-Leveson-Gower), sister of the 5th Duke of Sutherland, Sir Edward Simons Ward Bt and Mrs Sigrid Loeffler, none of whom survived.

== Inquest ==
An inquest into the deaths was opened at Meopham Green on 23 July 1930. After identification evidence for the victims and testimony from some of the witnesses had been heard the inquest was adjourned until August pending results from an Air Ministry Inquiry.

The inquest resumed on 13 August and heard more reports from witnesses and technical evidence from the investigation. The head of the Air Ministry investigation said the removal of parts of the wreckage for souvenirs had not helped his work. The investigation had shown no evidence of faulty material or bad workmanship but it was clear that the port wing had folded or collapsed upwards where it joined the fuselage. The engine and tail plane had broken away and the passengers were thrown out of the aircraft. The coroner directed that as a government inquiry would be held then some of the technical details of the accident need not be heard. The coroner could see no reason to further delay the verdict until after the inquiry by the Aeronautical Research Committee. The jury returned a verdict "that the victims met their death falling from an aeroplane, the cause of the accident being unknown".

== Investigation ==
The Junkers was an all-metal aircraft and had only flown about 100 hours since new. The flight was the third that day. Henderson had earlier flown his wife from Le Touquet to Croydon and had returned for four more passengers before going back again for the remaining four. Early indication showed that the port wing had become detached from the fuselage. The wreckage was removed to Croydon for investigation and four representatives from Junkers arrived from Germany. The investigation was assisted by personnel from the Deutsche Versuchsanstalt für Luftfahrt, the National Physical Laboratory and the Royal Aircraft Establishment.

Following the initial accident investigation an inquiry by the Accidents Investigation sub-committee of the Aeronautical Research Committee was opened on 3 September 1930. The inquiry was held at Croydon Airport in private and the members inspected the wreckage. The periodical Flight, in its issue dated 5 September 1930, called for the results of the investigation to be made public. It further called for all investigations into aircraft accidents to be made public. It also reported that representatives of some of the victims desired to ask questions at the inquiry. This was refused by Major Cooper, the Air Ministry inspector in charge of the investigation. Major Cooper stated that solicitors for the victims would each receive a copy of the report when it was published.

The final report was issued in January 1931 and the committee concluded the cause to be the "failure of the tailplane under severe buffeting from air eddies produced by the centre section of certain low-wing monoplanes when the aircraft approaches the stalling attitude".

They reported that the aircraft, flying in clouds, may have been thrown into an unusual attitude. This resulted in buffeting of the tailplane, causing the port tailplane to fail, and the aircraft entered a dive. The flutter effect on the starboard tailplane caused it to fail next. The aircraft was moving at high speed and reached a stalling attitude, causing the port wing to break away. The rapid angular acceleration caused the engine supports to break and the engine to fall away. Nine other causes were investigated but dismissed by the committee.
