= Kapp Dufferin =

Spit on Spitsbergen in Svalbard, Norway

Native name: Kapp Dufferin
- Location within Svalbard

Geography
- Coordinates: 77°57.7′N 18°28.4′E

Kapp Dufferin is a spit located northeast in Heer Land on the island of Spitsbergen in Svalbard, Norway. It is 1-kilometre (0.62 mi) wide with a lagoon, and makes up the eastern part of the coast east of Rjurikfjellet. It is named for Frederick Hamilton-Temple-Blackwood, 1st Marquess of Dufferin and Ava, who visited Svalbard in 1856 and wrote Letters From High Latitudes.
