= Thomas Fairfax, 13th Lord Fairfax of Cameron =

British Army officer and politician (1923–1964)

The Right Honourable The Lord Fairfax of Cameron
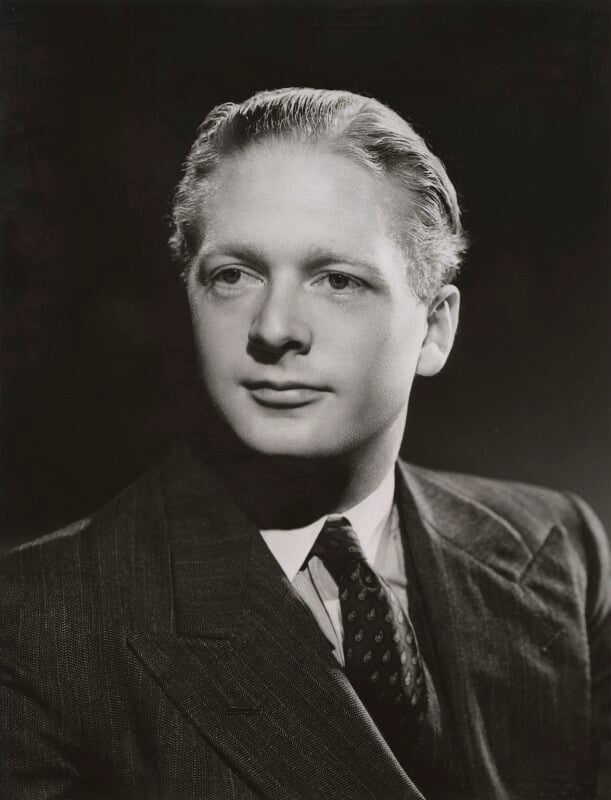
- Fairfax in 1946

Member of the House of Lords Lord Temporal
- In office 1945–1958; Scottish representative peer

Personal details
- Born: Thomas Brian McKelvie Fairfax; 14 May 1923 United Kingdom
- Died: 8 April 1964 (aged 40) London, England
- Spouse: Sonia Helen Gunston (m. 1951)
- Parent(s): Albert Fairfax, 12th Lord Fairfax of Cameron; Maude Wishart McKelvie

Thomas Brian McKelvie Fairfax, 13th Lord Fairfax of Cameron (14 May 1923 – 8 April 1964) was a British Army officer and Conservative politician.

== Career ==
He served in World War II as a lieutenant in the Grenadier Guards. In 1945, he was elected a Scottish representative peer, and served as Parliamentary Private Secretary to the Lord President of the Council (Lord Woolton and Lord Salisbury respectively) from 1951 to 1953 and to the Minister of Materials (Lord Woolton) between 1953 and 1954. In 1954 he was made a Lord-in-waiting (government whip in the House of Lords), a post he held until 1957.

== Personal life ==
In 1951, Lord Fairfax of Cameron married Sonia Helen Gunston, younger daughter of Cecil Bernard Gunston, MC, and his wife Lady Doris Hamilton-Temple-Blackwood. Lady Doris was the eldest daughter of Terence Hamilton-Temple-Blackwood, 2nd Marquess of Dufferin and Ava. They had four children:

- The Hon. Serena Frances Fairfax;
- Nicholas Fairfax, 14th Lord Fairfax of Cameron, who married Annabella Ruth, eldest daughter of Nicholas and Sarah Gilham Morriss, and succeeded his father;
- The Hon. Hugh Nigel Thomas Fairfax; and
- The Hon. Rupert Alexander James Fairfax.

He died in April 1964, aged 40, and was succeeded by his eight-year-old son, Nicholas. In 1967, his widow Lady Fairfax of Cameron was appointed Temporary Lady of the Bedchamber to Queen Elizabeth II.

== See also ==
- Lord Fairfax of Cameron

Peerage of Scotland
Preceded by Albert Fairfax	Lord Fairfax of Cameron; 1939–1958	Succeeded by Nicholas Fairfax
Political offices
Preceded by The Lord Mancroft	Lord-in-waiting; 1954–1957	Succeeded by The Marquess of Lansdowne
