= Frederick Hamilton-Temple-Blackwood, 3rd Marquess of Dufferin and Ava =

British soldier and politician (1875–1930)

The Most Honourable The Marquess of Dufferin and Ava DSO PC (Ire)
- Lord Dufferin in 1921

Speaker of the Senate of Northern Ireland
- In office 1921–1930
- Preceded by: New office
- Succeeded by: The Viscount Bangor

Personal details
- Born: Frederick Temple Hamilton-Temple-Blackwood; 26 February 1875 Ottawa, Ontario, Canada
- Died: 21 July 1930 (aged 55) Meopham, Kent, England
- Cause of death: Aircraft crash
- Spouse: Brenda Woodhouse (m. 1908)
- Children: 2
- Parents: Frederick, 1st Marquess of Dufferin and Ava; Hariot Rowan-Hamilton
- Relatives: Basil Temple Blackwood (brother); Terence, 2nd Marquess of Dufferin and Ava (brother)

Military service
- Allegiance: United Kingdom
- Branch/service: British Army
- Rank: Captain
- Battles/wars: Second Boer War; First World War
- Awards: Distinguished Service Order; Mentioned in Despatches (2)

Frederick Temple Hamilton-Temple-Blackwood, 3rd Marquess of Dufferin and Ava, DSO, PC (Ire) (26 February 1875 – 21 July 1930), styled Lord Frederick Blackwood between 1888 and 1918, was a British soldier and politician. He died in an aircraft crash in 1930 at the age of 55.

== Early life ==
Lord Dufferin was born on 26 February 1875 in Ottawa, Ontario, Canada, during his father's term as Governor General of Canada. He was the fourth son of Frederick Hamilton-Temple-Blackwood, 1st Marquess of Dufferin and Ava and Hariot Hamilton-Temple-Blackwood, Marchioness of Dufferin and Ava. While his father was Viceroy and Governor-General of India in the 1880s, his mother was known for leading an initiative to improve medical care for women in British India.

== Career ==
Hamilton-Temple-Blackwood joined the 9th Lancers as a second lieutenant on 11 August 1897. He was promoted to lieutenant on 9 October 1899, and served with his regiment during the Second Boer War from 1899 to 1901, where he was present at the engagements at Belmont, Enslin, Modder River, Magersfonstein, the relief of Kimberley, and the advance to Bloemfontein and Pretoria. He was also present at the subsequent fighting in the Transvaal, Orange River Colony and Cape Colony, where he was badly wounded on Christmas Eve 1900. Twice mentioned in despatches (including 31 March 1900), he was awarded the Distinguished Service Order (DSO) in November 1900 for his service during the war.

Hamilton-Temple-Blackwood retired from the army in 1913 with the rank of captain.

=== First World War ===
After leaving the army, Hamilton-Temple-Blackwood was appointed military secretary to the Governor General of Australia, Sir Ronald Munro-Ferguson (later Viscount Novar), who was his brother-in-law. Following the outbreak of the First World War, he rejoined his old regiment, the 9th Lancers, and was seriously wounded while serving on the Western Front in October 1914 and was subsequently transferred to the Grenadier Guards. He was again seriously wounded in the autumn of 1915, having returned to duty for only three days. He served as a staff captain in the Guards Division in 1916 and was seconded to the Machine Gun Corps as an instructor in 1918. After the war he was president of the Ulster Ex-Servicemen's Association.

=== Late career ===
Hamilton-Temple-Blackwood succeeded to the marquessate on the death of his elder brother, Terence Hamilton-Temple-Blackwood, 2nd Marquess of Dufferin and Ava, on 7 February 1918. His eldest brother Archibald, Earl of Ava had been killed in action at Waggon Hill in the Boer War in January 1900, while his other brother, Lord Basil Blackwood, had perished in an attack on German trenches in July 1917.

Lord Dufferin was elected to the Senate of the Parliament of Northern Ireland in 1921, where he served as Speaker from 1921 to 1930, and was sworn of the Privy Council of Ireland on 16 September 1921 and of the Privy Council of Northern Ireland on 12 December 1922. He was a Royal Naval Reserve (RNVR) aide-de-camp to King George V and was appointed Vice-Admiral of Ulster by the King in 1923, a post which his father had held.

== Personal life ==
Lord Dufferin was married on 10 June 1908 to Brenda Woodhouse, only daughter of Major Robert Woodhouse, of Orford House, Bishop's Stortford, Hertfordshire. They had two children:

- Basil Sheridan Hamilton-Temple-Blackwood, 4th Marquess of Dufferin and Ava (1909–1945), who married Maureen Constance, the second daughter of Hon. Arthur Ernest Guinness (a son of Edward Guinness, 1st Earl of Iveagh).
- Lady Veronica Brenda Hamilton-Temple-Blackwood (1910–1971), who married firstly Antony Hornby, second son of St John Hornby, of Shelley House, Chelsea and Chantemarle, Dorset, on 17 December 1931 (div. 1940) and has issue by the marriage; secondly Squadron Leader E. H. Maddick of the Royal Air Force in October 1941 (div. 1947); thirdly Captain Thomas Andrew Hussey CBE of the Royal Navy on 15 June 1947 (div. 1956); and fourthly to Peter Rebuck Wolfe in July 1956.

On 21 July 1930, Lord Dufferin was flying with a party of friends from Berck, a small village in France near Le Touquet, back to England when the aircraft crashed outside Meopham, Kent, killing all those on board. The others in the party were Sir Edward Simons Ward, Bt.; Viscountess Ednam, the wife of Viscount Ednam (heir to the Earl of Dudley) and a daughter of Cromartie Sutherland-Leveson-Gower, 4th Duke of Sutherland; and Mrs Loeffler, a well-known society hostess, along with the pilot, Lt. Col. George Lochart Henderson and the assistant pilot, Mr C. D. Shearing. Lord Dufferin was buried in the family burial ground at Clandeboye, County Down.

Lord Dufferin's widow married again after his death to Henry Charles Somers Augustus Somerset (1874–1945), the only son of Lord Henry Somerset (himself the brother of Henry Somerset, 9th Duke of Beaufort) on 28 January 1932. Mrs Somerset died on 17 July 1946.

== Arms ==
Coat of arms of Frederick Hamilton-Temple-Blackwood, 3rd Marquess of Dufferin and Ava
Coronet A Coronet of a Marquess Crest 1st: On a Cap of Maintenance Gules turned up Ermine a Crescent Argent (Blackwood); 2nd, On a Ducal Coronet Or a Martlet Gold (Temple); 3rd, a Demi-Antelope affrontée Ermine attired and unguled Or holding between his hoofs a Heart Gules (Hamilton, Earl of Clanbrassill) Escutcheon Quarterly, 1st and 4th, Azure a Fess Or in chief a Crescent Argent between two Mullets of the second and in base a Mascle of the third (Blackwood); 2nd, quarterly, 1st and 4th, Or an Eagle displayed Sable, 2nd and 3rd, Argent two Bars Sable each charged with three Martlets Or (Temple); 3rd, Gules three Cinquefoils pierced Ermine on a Chief Or a Lion passant of the field (Hamilton, Earl of Clanbrassill) Supporters Dexter: a Lion Gules armed and langued Azure gorged with a Tressure flory-counterflory Or; Sinister: an Heraldic Tiger Ermine gorged with a like Tressure Gules; each supporter supporting a Flag Staff proper therefrom flowing a Banner Or charged with a Peacock in his Pride also proper Motto Per Vias Rectas ( By straight ways)

Peerage of the United Kingdom
Preceded by Terence Hamilton-Temple-Blackwood	Marquess of Dufferin and Ava; 1918–1930	Succeeded by Basil Hamilton-Temple-Blackwood
Political offices
New office	Speaker of the Senate of Northern Ireland; 1921–1930	Succeeded by The Viscount Bangor
