= Walter Luttrell =

English landowner and soldier

Colonel Sir Geoffrey Walter Fownes Luttrell KCVO MC KStJ JP (2 October 1919 – 3 April 2007) was an English landowner in Somerset and a soldier who distinguished himself during the Second World War.

== Early life ==
Luttrell was born in Melbourne, Australia, where his father was private secretary to the Governor-General of Australia, Sir Ronald Munro-Ferguson. He grew up at Dunster Castle, his family's seat for six hundred years, then was educated at Eton and subsequently read Politics, Philosophy and Economics at Exeter College, Oxford, where he acquired the friendly nickname of "Goat". He was an avid fox-hunter and polo player in his youth and later a salmon fisherman.

== Army ==
Luttrell enlisted as a trooper in 1939 on the outbreak of the Second World War and was subsequently commissioned into the 15th/19th The King's Royal Hussars. In 1942 he married Hermione Hamilton Gunston (1923–2009), granddaughter of the 2nd Marquess of Dufferin and Ava; the couple had no children.

Luttrell landed with his regiment in Normandy two days after the first Normandy Landings and served as second-in-command of his squadron and as regimental gunnery officer during the Normandy campaign. In September 1944, a troop of his squadron was pinned down by German fire in difficult country at the bridgehead over the Meuse-Escaut canal, suffering two tanks disabled by broken tracks and the troop leader a casualty. Captain Luttrell successfully repaired the tanks under fire, extricated the troop, and inflicted heavy losses on the enemy.

In April 1945, during the advance into Germany and the fighting around Ibbenbüren, Luttrell's squadron seized a pass above the Teutoburger Wald and fought along the ridge there for a day without support, against heavy opposition. The squadron inflicted heavy casualties, and Luttrell received the Military Cross for his "bold and accurate" use of his 95 mm guns. After the War, Luttrell went with the Hussars to Palestine before retiring from the British Army in 1946.

== Post-retirement ==
After four years of farming near Tiverton, Devon, Luttrell moved into the family home at East Quantoxhead. He was an enthusiastic and community-minded landlord who ran the estates at East Quantoxhead and at Dunster after his father's death in 1957. In 1952 he joined the North Somerset Yeomanry, and would later be honorary colonel of 6th Battalion, The Light Infantry (TAVR). He also served as liaison officer for the Ministry of Agriculture from 1965 to 1971.

Luttrell was president of the Royal Bath and West Show in 1983 and 1992 and a regional director of Lloyds Bank from 1972 to 1983. In 1974, after his mother's death, he gave Dunster Castle to the National Trust. He was appointed Lord Lieutenant of Somerset in 1978, an office he held until 1994, was made a Knight of the Order of St John in 1981, and a KCVO in 1993.

== Arms ==
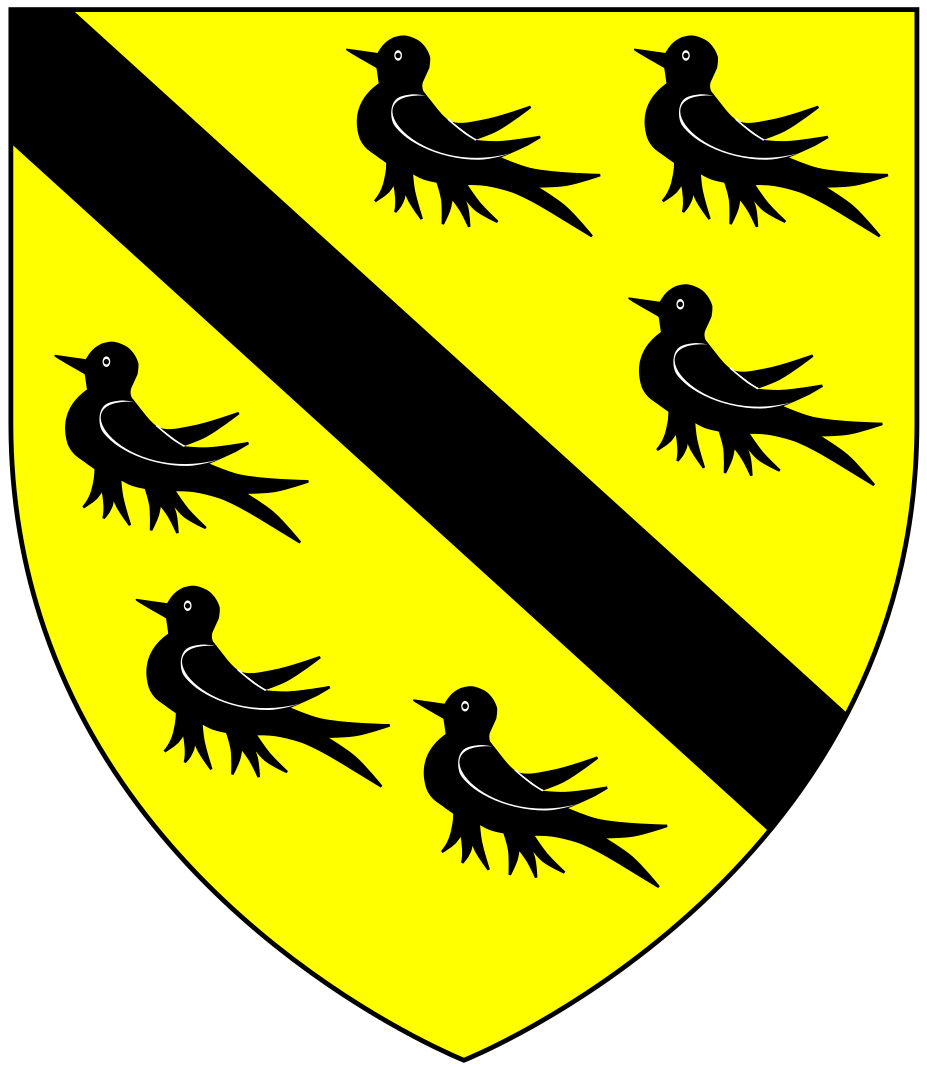
Arms of Luttrell of Dunster Castle

The coat of arms of the head of the Luttrell family of Dunster Castle is blazoned Or, a bend between six martlets sable, and the crest a boar passant argent crined or.

Honorary titles
Preceded by Nicholas Clive-Ponsonby-Fane	High Sheriff of Somerset; 1960–1961	Succeeded by Richard Cely-Trevilian
Preceded by William Quincey Roberts	Honorary Colonel of 6th Battalion, The Light Infantry; 1977–1987	Succeeded by Barry Michael Lane
Preceded by Cecil Townley Mitford-Slade	Lord Lieutenant of Somerset; 1978–1994	Succeeded by Sir John Wills, Bt
