= Rosemary Ward, Viscountess Ednam =

British socialite (1893–1930)

Rosemary Ward, Viscountess Ednam ARRC
- Rosemary Leveson-Gower in 1917
- Born: Rosemary Millicent Sutherland-Leveson-Gower; 9 August 1893; Dunrobin Castle, Sutherland, Scotland
- Died: 21 July 1930 (aged 36); Meopham, Kent, England
- Burial place: Himley Hall, Staffordshire, England
- Spouse: William, Viscount Ednam (m. 1919)
- Children: 3, including William Ward, 4th Earl of Dudley
- Parents: Cromartie Sutherland-Leveson-Gower, 4th Duke of Sutherland (father); Lady Millicent St Clair-Erskine (mother)
- Relatives: Tracy Somerset, Duchess of Beaufort (granddaughter); Rachel Ward (granddaughter)

Rosemary Millicent Ward, Viscountess Ednam ARRC (née Sutherland-Leveson-Gower, 9 August 1893 – 21 July 1930), was a British socialite who served as a nurse in France during the First World War. She almost married Edward, Prince of Wales (later Edward VIII) but his proposal was vetoed by his parents, King George V and Queen Mary. In 1919 she married William, Viscount Ednam, to become Viscountess Ednam. The Viscountess died on 21 July 1930 in the Meopham air disaster.

== Early life ==
Lady Rosemary Millicent Sutherland-Leveson-Gower was the fourth (and youngest) child of Cromartie Sutherland-Leveson-Gower, 4th Duke of Sutherland and his wife, Millicent St Clair-Erskine. Born at the family home at Dunrobin Castle in Sutherland on 8 August 1893, the young Lady Rosemary featured in the society pages of newspapers from an early age. A debutante in 1911, her appearances in the society pages increased and she was courted by John Manners, Marquess of Granby. In early 1913 they became engaged but she broke the engagement off while recuperating from appendicitis later the same year.

== First World War ==
With the outbreak of the First World War, Rosemary's life changed. Her mother went to Belgium in early August 1914, having organised her own ambulance unit, but was captured by the Germans when Namur was occupied towards the end of that month. Due to her connections with both the British and German royal families, the Duchess and her staff were repatriated via Holland. After a short rest, the Duchess returned to northern France to reinstate her unit. Rosemary went with her as a Voluntary Aid Detachment (VAD) nurse. After spending most of 1915 in France, she returned to the United Kingdom for rest and to help with fundraising efforts in November 1915. Upon her return to France in 1916, Rosemary's reputation as a nurse increased, and when she returned to the United Kingdom in December, it was commented that she had delayed her leave as "they [the hospital surgeons] couldn't do without her". Her war work was officially recognised with a mention in dispatches in January 1917. Although she continued to serve in France during 1917 and 1918, she spent time in 1918 in the United Kingdom on fundraising efforts. At the end of the war, Rosemary was awarded an Associate Royal Red Cross (ARRC) in the 1919 Birthday Honours.

== Relationship with the Prince of Wales ==
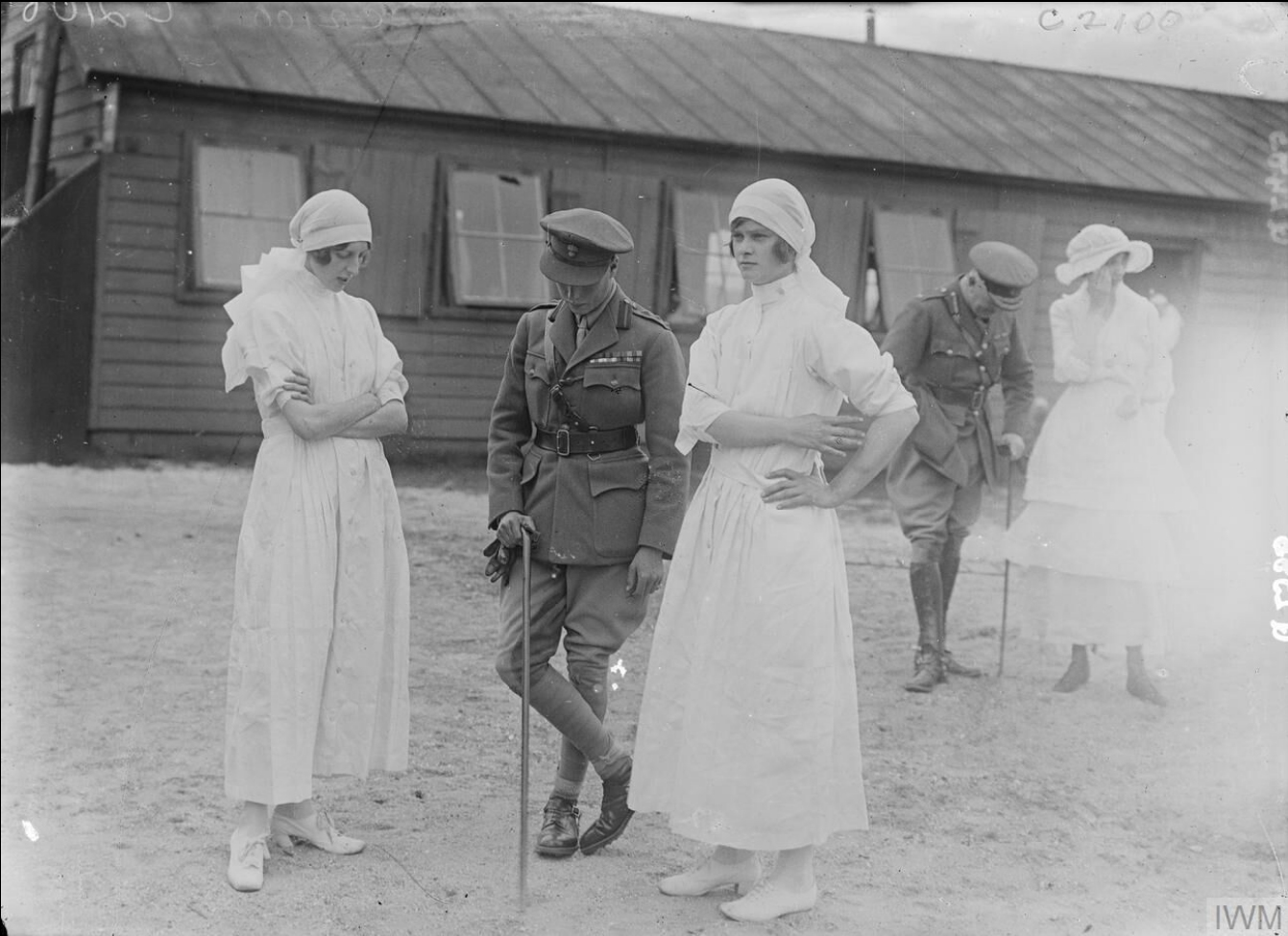
Lady Rosemary (centre) with Edward, Prince of Wales (looking down), at the Millicent Sutherland hospital, 14 July 1917

Leveson-Gower and the Prince of Wales (the future Edward VIII) had known each other since childhood as the Prince's parents, King George V and Queen Mary, had often been guests of the Duke of Sutherland. They met again in France during the war as the Prince visited the hospital to see another friend, Rosemary's sister-in-law, Eileen Sutherland-Leveson-Gower, Duchess of Sutherland. In July 1917, the King and Queen accompanied by the Prince visited the hospital and the Prince and Rosemary recommenced their friendship. Over the following weeks they met often and the relationship was only interrupted by the Prince's assignment to the Italian Front. Upon his return he and Rosemary continued to meet. At this time the Prince proposed to Rosemary and while she was at first reluctant to accept she did so as she thought "she could make something of him".

As the heir to the throne, the Prince needed the permission of the King to marry—a requirement of the Royal Marriages Act 1772. While the King and Queen liked Rosemary they vetoed the marriage. The refusal was based on doubts about the Duchess' family, the St Clair-Erskine family, and of two people in particular. The first was Daisy Greville, Countess of Warwick, who was Rosemary's half-aunt and had been a mistress of Edward VII, the King's father. After his father's death, King George had to take legal action against the Countess to prevent publication of the letters from King Edward to her. The other person was Rosemary's uncle, James St Clair-Erskine, 5th Earl of Rosslyn. The earl had been married three times and was a compulsive gambler who had been made bankrupt. The monarchy considered their characters to be flawed, and their closeness to Rosemary was enough for permission to be withheld. Once Rosemary was made aware of the King and Queen's views her demeanour was that she had never wanted to marry the Prince of Wales.

The two did remain friends and the Prince of Wales was the godfather of Rosemary's eldest son. After her death in 1930, Thelma Furness (one of the Prince's later mistresses) recalled that on hearing of Rosemary's death the Prince cried for the only time that she ever saw and that he was very shocked and upset by the news.

== Later life ==
Soon after the end of her relationship with the Prince of Wales, Rosemary was courted by William Ward, Viscount Ednam. The couple married on 8 March 1919 and Rosemary became Viscountess Ednam. Their eldest son was born in January 1920 and subsequently the couple had a daughter, who was stillborn, and two more sons. The marriage was not always happy, William did have an affair with Venetia Stanley and was believed to be the father of her daughter, born in 1923. He may also have had other affairs while the Viscountess certainly entertained, and was seen with, other men, including the Prince of Wales and Duff Cooper.

However volatile their personal life may have been, the Viscountess was fully supportive of her husband's political career and spoke both in support of his election campaigns but also campaigned for the wider Conservative Party.

Since her early years the Viscountess had been involved in charitable activities, notably those of her mother. In 1927 the Viscountess became president of the North Staffordshire Cripples' Aid Society (founded by her mother in 1900) and began a campaign to raise funds for extending the Hartshill Orthopaedic Hospital in Stoke-on-Trent. The traditional home of the Ward family was Himley Hall near Dudley and the Viscountess worked towards the establishment of a maternity hospital at Burton Road Hospital in Dudley. The home was named the Rosemary Ednam Home after her.

In December 1929 the couple's second son, John Jeremy (known as Jeremy), was killed in a road traffic accident in London.

== Death ==
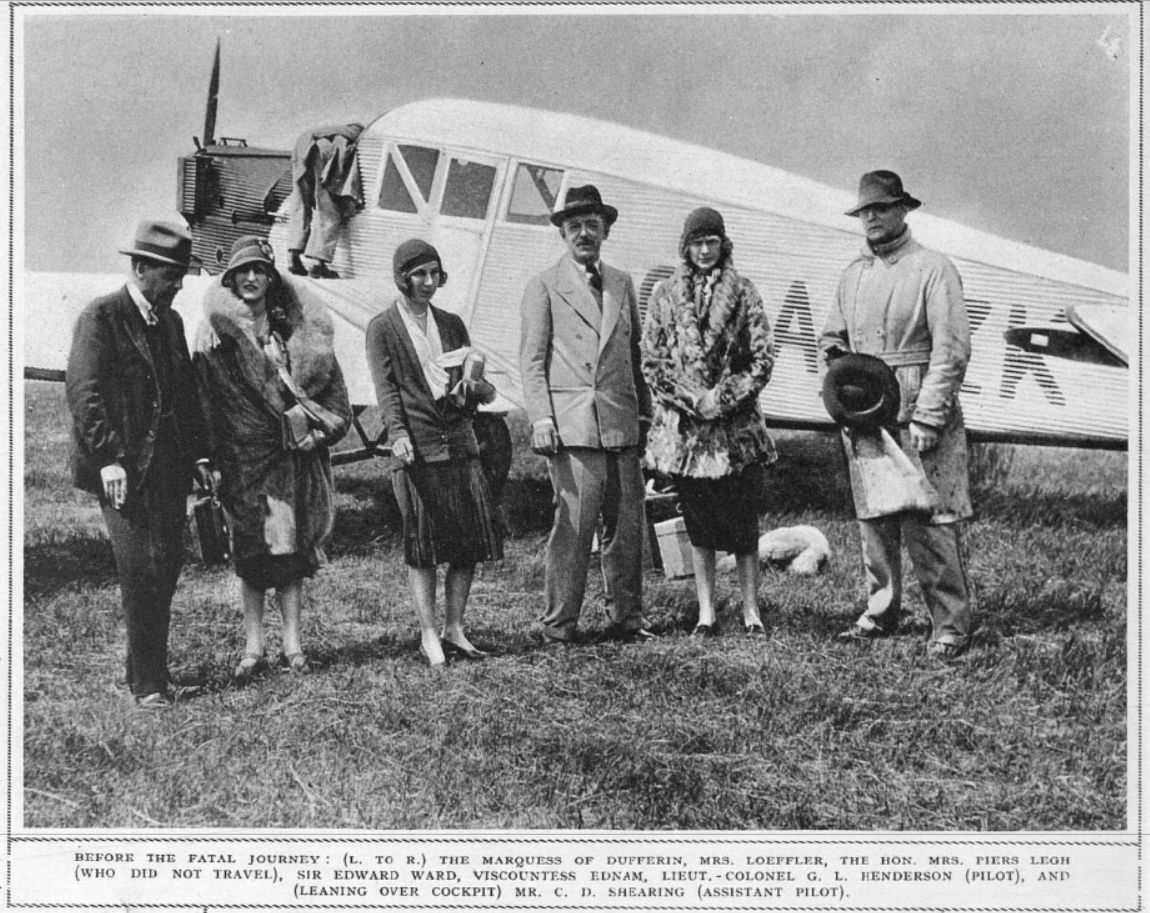
The Viscountess (second from right) and the other passengers and crew pictured just before take-off of the fatal flight

Following Jeremy's death the Viscount and Viscountess took an extended stay at a house in France. While there the Viscount contracted typhoid fever and while he was still recuperating the Viscountess needed to return to London to meet with the architect designing a memorial garden for Jeremy. On Monday 21 July 1930 she was booked on a flight from Le Touquet to Croydon. A seat became available on an earlier flight which the Viscountess accepted. The flight departed in clear weather. At about at 2:30 pm in poor weather over Kent the tail unit failed, causing the aircraft to stall, which in turn caused the port wing to break away and the plane to crash. All the passengers fell from the aircraft through the hole created by the wing breaking away. The Viscountess' body was found in a meadow. An inquest was opened on 23 July where the Viscountess was identified by her brother, George. After the formal identifications, the inquest was adjourned for the Air Ministry technical investigation to take place. The inquest was resumed on 13 August 1930 the jury returned a verdict "that the victims met their death falling from an aeroplane, the cause of the accident being unknown".

A memorial service for the Viscountess was held at St Margaret's, Westminster on 25 July 1930. Her funeral was conducted at Himley Hall on 25 July 1930 and she was buried next to Jeremy.

On 15 November 1931 the hospital extension at Hartshill, Stoke-on-Trent for which the Viscountess had campaigned was officially opened by the Prince of Wales as the Rosemary Ednam Memorial Hospital in tribute to the Viscountess.
