= Frederick Hamilton-Temple-Blackwood, 1st Marquess of Dufferin and Ava =

British public servant and prominent member of Victorian society (1826–1902)

His Excellency The Most Honourable The Marquess of Dufferin and Ava KP GCB GCSI GCMG GCIE PC
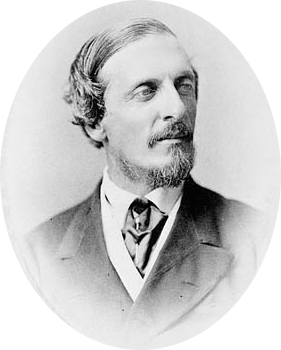
- Lord Dufferin in 1873

Viceroy and Governor-General of India
- In office 13 December 1884 – 10 December 1888
- Monarch: Victoria
- Preceded by: The Marquess of Ripon
- Succeeded by: The Marquess of Lansdowne

Governor General of Canada
- In office 25 June 1872 – 25 November 1878
- Monarch: Victoria
- Prime Minister: Canadian: Sir John A. Macdonald; Alexander Mackenzie; British: William Ewart Gladstone; The Earl of Beaconsfield
- Preceded by: The Lord Lisgar
- Succeeded by: Marquess of Lorne

Chancellor of the Duchy of Lancaster
- In office 12 December 1868 – 9 August 1872
- Monarch: Victoria
- Prime Minister: William Ewart Gladstone
- Preceded by: Thomas Edward Taylor
- Succeeded by: Hugh Childers

British Ambassador to France
- In office 1891–1896
- Preceded by: The Earl of Lytton
- Succeeded by: Sir Edmund Monson

Personal details
- Born: Frederick Temple Blackwood; 21 June 1826 Florence, Grand Duchy of Tuscany
- Died: 12 February 1902 (aged 75) Clandeboye Estate; Bangor, County Down, Ireland
- Party: Liberal
- Spouse: Hariot Rowan-Hamilton
- Children: Lady Helen Hamilton-Temple-Blackwood; Archibald Hamilton-Temple-Blackwood, Earl of Ava; Terence Hamilton-Temple-Blackwood, 2nd Marquess of Dufferin and Ava; Hermione Munro Ferguson, Viscountess Novar; Lord Basil Hamilton-Temple-Blackwood; Alexandrina Plunket, Lady Plunket; Frederick Hamilton-Temple-Blackwood, 3rd Marquess of Dufferin and Ava
- Parents: Price Blackwood, 4th Baron Dufferin and Claneboye; Helen Selina Sheridan
- Education: Christ Church, Oxford

Frederick Hamilton-Temple-Blackwood, 1st Marquess of Dufferin and Ava (21 June 1826 – 12 February 1902), was a British statesman, traveller and prominent member of Victorian society. He served as Governor-General of Canada and Viceroy of India.

In his youth he was a popular figure in the court of Queen Victoria, and became well known to the public after publishing a best-selling account of his travels in the North Atlantic.

He is now best known as one of the most successful public servants of his time. His long career in public service began as a commissioner to Syria in 1860, where his skillful diplomacy maintained British interests while preventing France from instituting a client state in Lebanon. After his success in Syria, Dufferin served in the Government of the United Kingdom as the Chancellor of the Duchy of Lancaster and Under-Secretary of State for War. In 1872 he became Governor General of Canada, bolstering imperial ties in the early years of the Dominion. In this position, he was Queen Victoria's representative in Canada, promoting a British perspective and raising funds for Quebec City. In 1884 he reached the pinnacle of his official career as Viceroy of India.

He served as ambassador to France from 1891 to 1896. Following his retirement from the diplomatic service in 1896, his final years were marred by personal tragedy and a misguided attempt to secure his family's financial position. His eldest son was killed in the Second Boer War and another son was badly wounded. He was chairman of a mining firm that went bankrupt after swindling people, although he was ignorant of the matter. One biographer, Richard Davenport-Hines says he was "imaginative, sympathetic, warm-hearted, and gloriously versatile." He was an effective leader in Lebanon, Canada and India, averted war with Russia, and annexed Burma. He was careless with money but charming in high society on three continents.

== Early life ==
He was born Frederick Temple Blackwood into the Ascendancy, Ireland's Anglo-Irish aristocracy, the son of Price Blackwood, 4th Baron Dufferin and Claneboye. On his father's side, Dufferin was descended from Scottish settlers who had moved to County Down in the early 17th century. The Blackwood family became prominent landowners in Ulster over the following two hundred years, and were created baronets in 1763, entering the Peerage of Ireland in 1800 as Baron Dufferin. The family had influence in parliament because they controlled the return for the borough of Killyleagh. Marriages in the Blackwood family were often advantageous to their landowning and high-society ambitions. His mother, Helen Selina Sheridan, was the granddaughter of the playwright Richard Brinsley Sheridan and through her, the family became connected to English literary and political circles.

Dufferin was born in 1826 in Florence, then the capital of the Grand Duchy of Tuscany in the Italian Peninsula, with great advantages. He was educated at Eton and at Christ Church, Oxford, where he became president of the Oxford Union Society for debate, although he left Oxford after only two years without obtaining a degree. While still an Oxford undergraduate, he visited Skibbereen in County Cork to see the impact of the Irish Famine first-hand. He was appalled by what he saw, prompting him to raise money on behalf of the starving poor. In 1841, while still at school, he succeeded his father as Baron Dufferin and Claneboye in the Peerage of Ireland and in 1849 was appointed a Lord-in-Waiting to Queen Victoria. In 1850 he was additionally created Baron Claneboye, of Clandeboye in the County of Down, in the Peerage of the United Kingdom. He inherited 18,000 acres in County Down.

In 1856, Dufferin commissioned the schooner Foam and set off on a journey around the North Atlantic. He first made landfall on Iceland, where he visited the then very small Reykjavík, the plains of Þingvellir, and Geysir. Returning to Reykjavík, Foam was towed north by Prince Napoleon, who was on an expedition to the region in the steamer La Reine Hortense. Dufferin sailed close to Jan Mayen Island, but was unable to land there due to heavy ice and caught only a very brief glimpse of the island through the fog. From Jan Mayen, Foam sailed on to northern Norway, stopping at Hammerfest before sailing for Spitzbergen.

On his return, Dufferin published a book about his travels, Letters From High Latitudes. With its irreverent style and lively pace, it was extremely successful and can be regarded as the prototype of the comic travelogue. It remained in print for many years and was translated into French, German and Urdu. The letters were nominally written to his mother, with whom he had developed a very close relationship after the death of his father when he was 15.

== A natural diplomat ==
Despite the great success of Letters From High Latitudes, Dufferin did not pursue a career as an author, although he was known for his skilful writing throughout his career. Instead, he became a public servant, with his first major public appointment in 1860 as British representative on a commission to Syria to investigate the causes of a civil war earlier that year in which the Maronite Christian population had been subject to massacres by the Muslim and Druze populations. In light of this work in June 1861 he was appointed Knight Commander of the Order of the Bath. Working with French, Russian, Prussian and Turkish representatives on the commission, Dufferin proved remarkably successful in achieving the objectives of British policy in the area. He upheld Turkish rule in the area, and prevented the French from establishing a client state in Lebanon, later securing the removal of a French occupying force in Syria. He also defended the interests of the Druze community, with whom Britain had a long association. The other parties on the commission were inclined to repress the Druze population, but Dufferin argued that had the Christians won the war they would have been just as bloodthirsty. The long-term plan agreed by the commission for the governance of the region was largely that proposed by Dufferin — that Lebanon should be governed separately from the rest of Syria, by a Christian Ottoman who was not a native of Syria. He was appointed a Knight of the Order of Saint Patrick on 28 January 1864.

Dufferin's achievements in Syria launched his long and successful career in public service. In 1864 he became Under-Secretary of State for India, moving to Under-Secretary of War in 1866, and from 1868 he held the position of Chancellor of the Duchy of Lancaster in Prime Minister Gladstone's government. In 1871 he was raised in the Peerage as Earl of Dufferin, in the County of Down, and Viscount Claneboye, of Clandeboye in the County of Down.

== Family ==
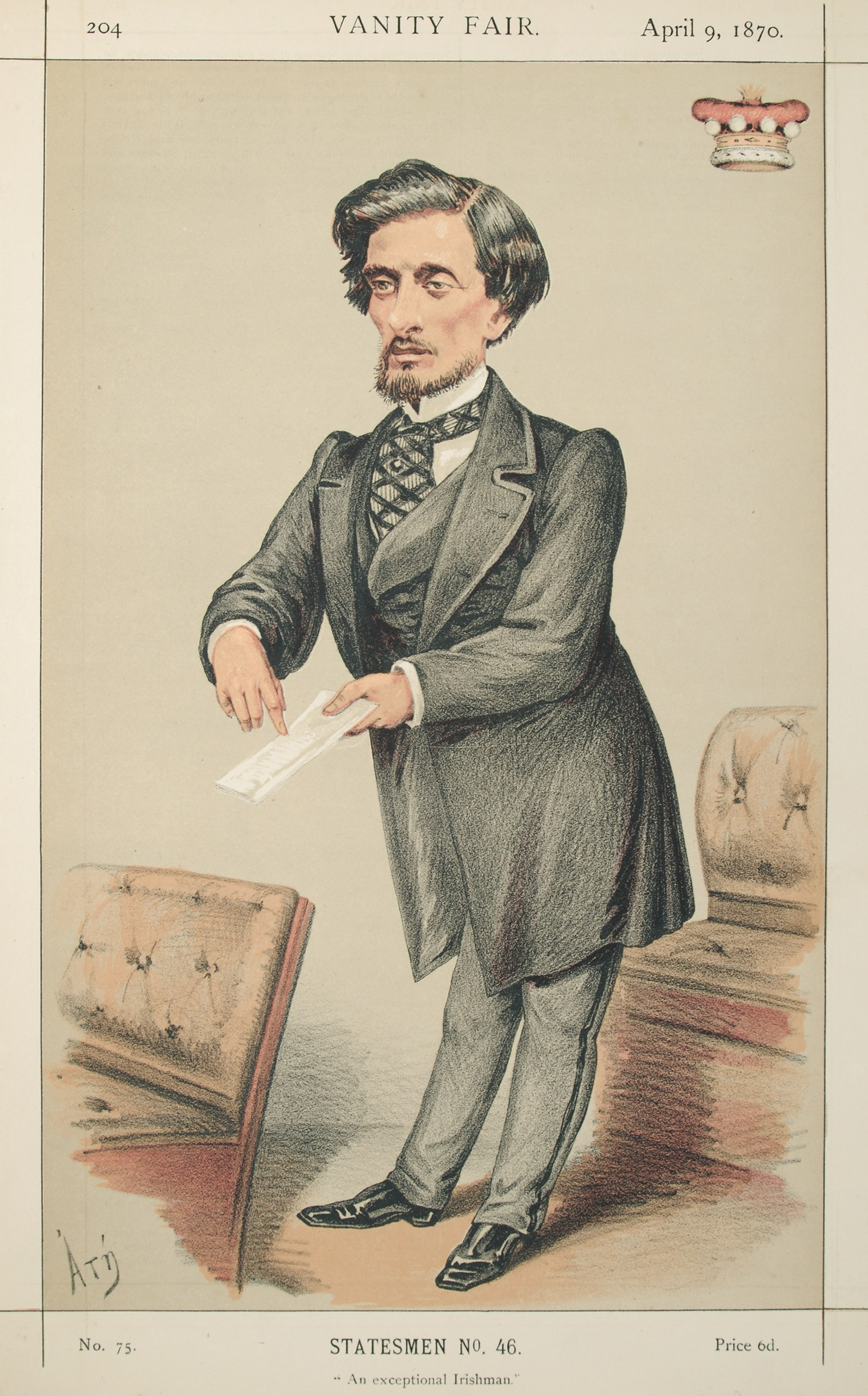
Lord Dufferin by Vanity Fair, 1870

Lord Dufferin took the name Hamilton by royal licence on 9 September 1862, shortly before his marriage to Hariot Georgina Rowan-Hamilton on 23 October 1862. He was distantly related to the Hamilton family by previous marriages, and the union was partly designed to eliminate some long-standing hostilities between the families. Dufferin also took the name of Temple, on 13 November 1872. They had seven surviving children; the two youngest, a son and a daughter, were born in Canada:

- Archibald James Leofric Temple Hamilton-Temple-Blackwood, Earl of Ava (28 July 1863 – 11 January 1900), was a lieutenant in the 17th Lancers and a fellow of the Royal Colonial Institute. He was a war correspondent in South Africa during the Second Boer War and was wounded at Wagon Hill during the Siege of Ladysmith. Lord Ava died a week later. He was unmarried.
- Lady Helen Hermione Hamilton-Temple-Blackwood (1865–9 April 1941), GBE (1918), LLD, JP for Fife, was married on 31 August 1889 to Ronald Munro Ferguson (later 1st and last Viscount Novar), who later became Governor-General of Australia. They had no issue.
- Terence Hamilton-Temple-Blackwood, 2nd Marquess of Dufferin and Ava (16 March 1866 – 7 February 1918). Married and had issue, three daughters.
- Lady Hermione Catherine Helen Hamilton-Temple-Blackwood (1869–19 October 1960) trained as a nurse and qualified in 1901, serving in France during the First World War. She was awarded the Médaille de la Reconnaissance française for her services. She died unmarried.
- Lord Ian Basil Gawaine Temple Hamilton-Temple-Blackwood (4 November 1870 – 3 July 1917) was a barrister-at-law. He was at Balliol College, Oxford in 1891 and became part of the 'kindergarten' of Lord Milner. He was appointed Deputy Judge Advocate in South Africa in 1900, secretary to the High Commissioner to South Africa in 1902, Assistant Colonial Secretary in the Orange River Colony in 1903, Colonial Secretary in Barbados from 1907 to 1909 and Assistant Secretary to the Land Development Commission of England from 1910 to 1914. He was attached to the 9th Lancers and Intelligence Corps from 1914 to 1916 and then appointed Private Secretary to Ivor Churchill Guest, 1st Viscount Wimborne, the Lord Lieutenant of Ireland, in 1916. He returned to active service as a lieutenant in the Grenadier Guards and was killed in action in 1917. His most prominent legacy is the corpus of drawings he did for Hilaire Belloc's books (over the signature `BTB'). He was unmarried.
- Lady Victoria Alexandrina Hamilton-Temple-Blackwood (1873–1938), whose chief sponsor at her christening was Queen Victoria, was married firstly in 1894 to William Lee Plunket, 5th Baron Plunket and had eight children by him, and secondly to Colonel Francis Powell Braithwaite CBE DSO. Her son Terence Conyngham Plunket, 6th Baron Plunket was married to Dorothé Mabel Lewis, the illegitimate daughter of Charles Stewart Henry Vane-Tempest-Stewart, 7th Marquess of Londonderry, and both were killed in an aircraft accident in 1938, while her younger son Flight Lieutenant the Honourable Brinsley Sheridan Bushe Plunket was married in 1927 to Aileen Guinness, the sister of Maureen Guinness, who was later to marry Basil Hamilton-Temple-Blackwood, 4th Marquess of Dufferin and Ava. Terence and Dorothé's eldest son Patrick Terence William Span Plunket, 7th Baron Plunket was an equerry to The Queen and Deputy Master of the Household, and their second son was Robin Rathmore Plunket, 8th Baron Plunket.
- Frederick Hamilton-Temple-Blackwood, 3rd Marquess of Dufferin and Ava (26 February 1875 – 21 July 1930)
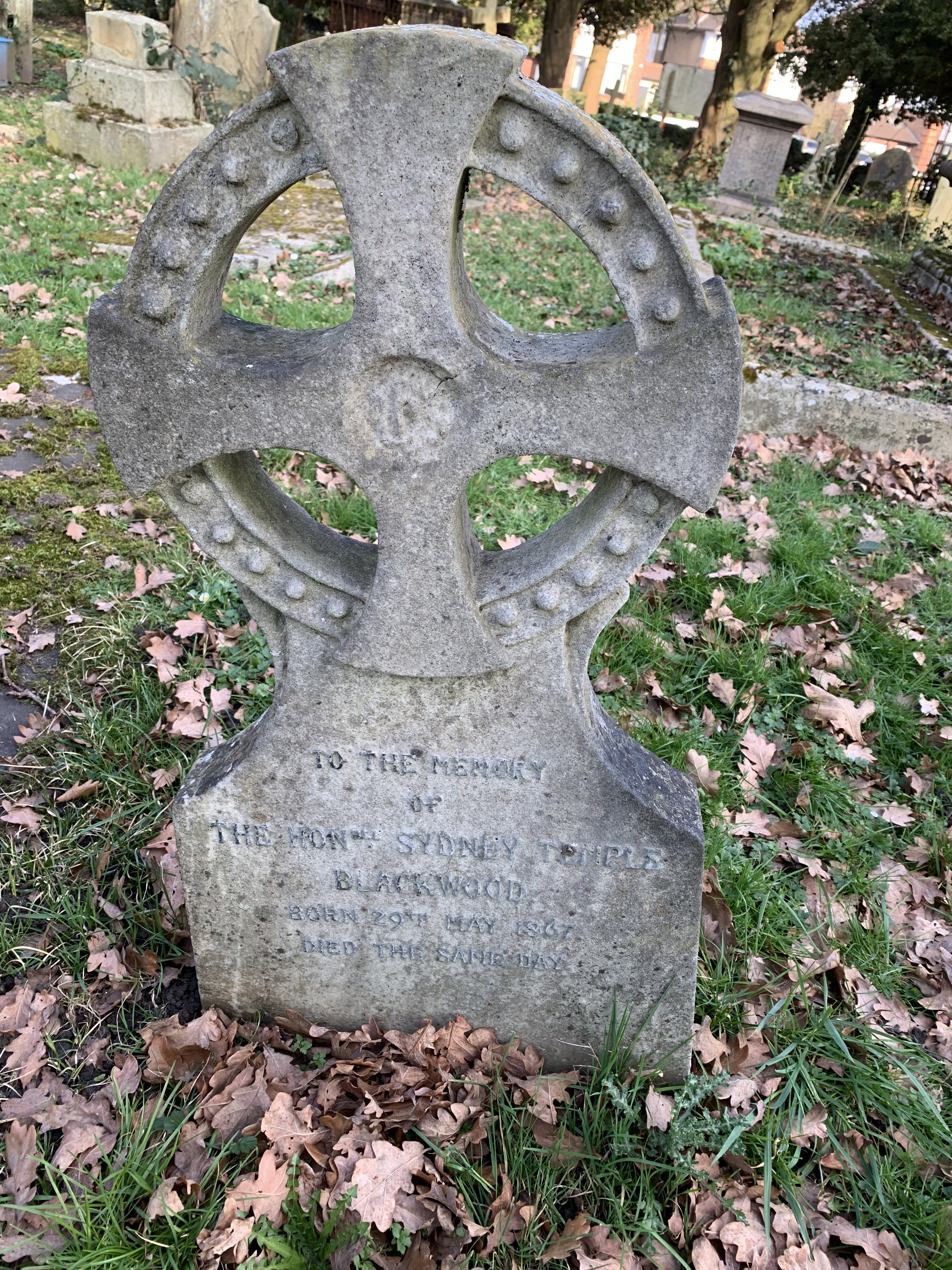
- Gravestone of Sydney Temple Blackwood
  In addition, they had a son, Sydney Temple Blackwood, who was born on 29 May 1867, but died the same day. His gravestone stands at St Katherine's Church, in Friern Barnet Lane, London:

Shortly after his marriage, he was deeply upset when his mother married his friend George Hay, Earl of Gifford, a man some 17 years her junior. The marriage scandalised society, but Lord Gifford died only weeks afterwards. Despite his disapproval of his mother's second marriage, Lord Dufferin was devastated by her death in 1867, and built Helen's Tower, a memorial to her, on the estate at Clandeboye. A nearby bay was also named Helen's Bay, and a railway station of that name was built there by him, seeding the growth of the modern Belfast commuter town of Helen's Bay.

== Governor General of Canada ==
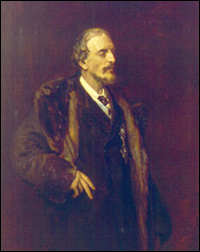
Lord Dufferin as Governor General of Canada

After his mother's death, Dufferin's diplomatic career advanced rapidly. He became Governor General of Canada in 1872, and his six-year tenure was a period of rapid change in Canadian history. During his term, Prince Edward Island was admitted to Confederation, and several well-known Canadian institutions, such as the Supreme Court of Canada, the Royal Military College of Canada, and the Intercolonial Railway, were established.

In Dufferin's opinion, his two predecessors in the post had not given the position the prominence it deserved. He consciously set out to assume a more active role, and to get to know ordinary Canadians as much as possible. He was at ease speaking with a wide variety of people, both in English and French, and became known for his charm and hospitality. At a time when a weak or uncharismatic Governor General might have loosened the ties to Empire, Dufferin felt that involving himself with the people of Canada would strengthen constitutional links to Britain. He visited every Canadian province, and was the first Governor General to visit Manitoba. He took a keen interest in the Governor General's Foot Guards, organized in 1872.

Lord Dufferin involved himself as much as was permissible in Canadian politics, even going so far as to advise ministers to abandon policies which he thought were mistaken. He followed proceedings in the Parliament with interest, although as the Queen's representative, he was barred from entering the House of Commons. He established an Office of the Governor General in a wing of the Parliament buildings, and Lady Dufferin attended many debates and reported back to him. In 1873, the Pacific scandal arose when the Conservative government of John A. Macdonald was accused by the Liberal opposition of financial impropriety in relation to the construction of the Canadian Pacific Railway. Dufferin prorogued parliament, and established an enquiry which found against the Government, and Macdonald fell from power.

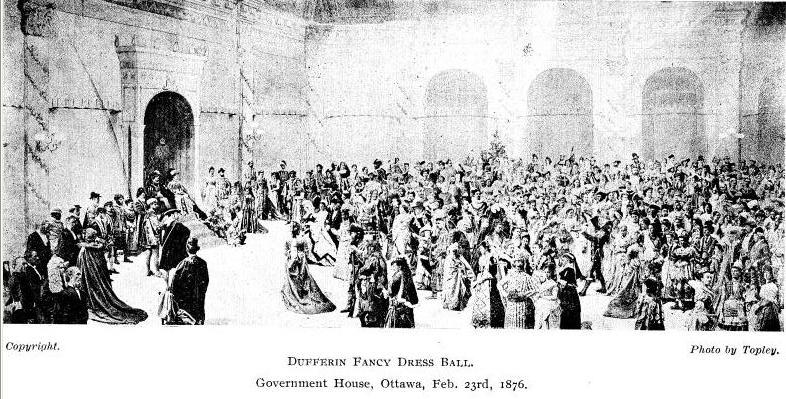
Earl of Dufferin Fancy Dress Ball, Government House, Ottawa 23 February 1876

In 1873, Dufferin established the Governor General's Academic Medals for superior academic achievement by Canadian students. These medals are the most prestigious that school students can be awarded, and more than 50,000 have been awarded. He also instituted several sporting prizes, including the Governor General's Match for shooting, and the Governor General's Curling Trophy.

Dufferin made several extensions and improvements to Rideau Hall, the Governor General's official residence. He added a ballroom in 1873, and in 1876 built the Tent Room to accommodate the increasing number of functions being held at the Hall. He also attracted ordinary Canadians to the Hall grounds by constructing an ice skating rink, to which he contributed CA$1,624.95 of his own money, which was later reimbursed by the government. Public use of the rink was on condition of being "properly dressed". These additions enhanced Rideau Hall's role as an important centre of social affairs.

Lord and Lady Dufferin on a visit to Manitoba

The Dufferins also made extensive use of the Citadel of Quebec in Quebec City as a second vice-regal residence, having developed a strong attachment to the city and its significant historical ties with the British Empire. When Quebec city officials began to demolish the old city walls, Dufferin was appalled, persuading them to stop the demolition, and to repair and restore what had already been damaged (Old Quebec was eventually recognized by UNESCO as a World Heritage Site in 1985). Dufferin's final public appearance as Governor General was in Quebec City, to lay the foundation stone for Dufferin Terrace, an expansive walkway overlooking the St Lawrence River built to his own design and arguably his best-known legacy in Canada. In 1876 he was appointed Knight Grand Cross of the Order of St Michael and St George (GCMG).

Lady Dufferin also maintained a high profile during her husband's term as Governor General, accompanying him on tours and frequently appearing in public. Visiting Manitoba in September 1877, Lord and Lady Dufferin each drove a spike in the line of the new Canadian Pacific Railway, and the first engine on the railway was christened Lady Dufferin. Throughout her time in Canada, Lady Dufferin wrote letters to her mother in Ireland, which were later collected and published as My Canadian Journal. She later said that of all her experiences, her happiest times had been spent in Canada.

The popularity and influence of the Dufferins in Canada is reflected by the large number of Canadian schools, streets and public buildings named after them. Lord Dufferin is particularly well remembered in Manitoba, being the first Governor General to visit the province; a statue of him is outside the provincial legislature.

== Russia and Turkey (1879–1884) ==
After leaving Ottawa in 1878 at the end of his term, Dufferin returned to Great Britain to continue his diplomatic career. He served as ambassador to Imperial Russia from 1879 to 1881 and to the Ottoman Empire from 1881 to 1884. Although he had previously served in Liberal governments, Dufferin had become increasingly alienated from William Ewart Gladstone over issues of home and Irish policy, particularly the Landlord and Tenant (Ireland) Act 1870 and the Land Law (Ireland) Act 1881, both of which tried to resolve issues surrounding the property rights of tenants and landlords. He accepted the appointment as ambassador to Russia from the Conservative Benjamin Disraeli, further alienating the Liberal leader.

Dufferin's time in Russia was quiet from a political and diplomatic point of view, and his papers from this time are concerned mainly with his social life. While in Russia, he began to set his sights on the ultimate diplomatic prize, the Viceroyalty of India. However, Lord Ripon succeeded Lord Lytton in 1880, largely because as a convert to Roman Catholicism, Ripon could not be accommodated in the Cabinet. Instead, Dufferin's next diplomatic posting was to Constantinople.

His posting there saw Britain invade and occupy Egypt, then technically part of the Ottoman Empire, under the pretext of "restoring law and order" following anti-foreign riots in Alexandria which had left nearly 50 foreigners dead, and Dufferin was heavily involved in the events surrounding the occupation. Dufferin managed to ensure that the Ottoman Empire did not attain a military foothold in Egypt, and placated the population of Egypt by preventing the execution of Urabi Pasha, who had seized control of the Egyptian army. Urabi had led the resistance to foreign influence in Egypt, and after the occupation, many in the Cabinet were keen to see him hanged. Dufferin, believing this would only inspire further resistance, instead ensured that Urabi was exiled to Ceylon.

In 1882 Dufferin travelled to Egypt as British commissioner, to investigate the reorganization of the country. He wrote a report (known as the Dufferin Report) detailing how the occupation was to benefit Egypt, with plans for development which were to progressively re-involve Egyptians in running the country. Subsequent reforms proceeded largely along the lines he had proposed. He was promoted to Knight Grand Cross of the Order of the Bath (civil division) on 15 June 1883.

== Viceroy of India (1884–1888) ==
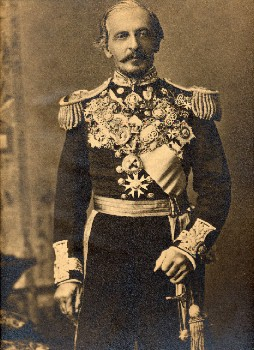
Lord Dufferin as Viceroy of India

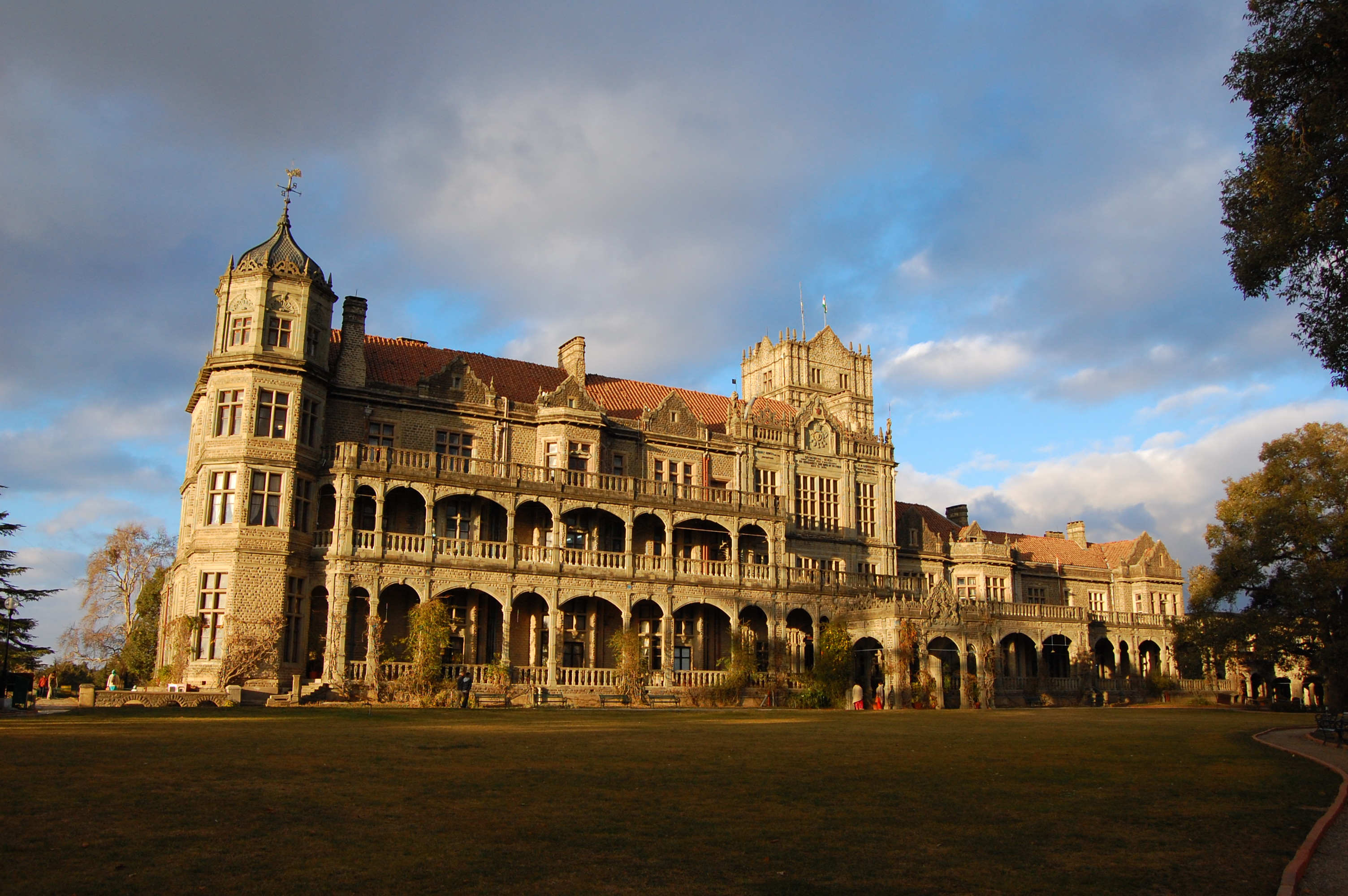
Viceregal Lodge, Shimla. Lord Dufferin moved in on 23 July 1888.

His experiences in Russia and Turkey had further increased his awareness of the British Empire's place in international affairs, and his time in Russia had provided great insight into the Russian threat to British rule in India. In 1884, he finally achieved his last great diplomatic ambition with his appointment as Viceroy of India. As such, he was ex officio Grand Master and Knight Grand Commander of the Order of the Star of India (GCSI) and Knight Grand Commander of the Order of the Indian Empire, though he was not appointed GCIE until 1887.

Just as in Canada, he presided over some great changes in India. His predecessor as Viceroy, Lord Ripon, while popular with the Indians, was very unpopular with the Anglo-Indians, who objected to the rapid pace of his extensive reforms. To rule with any success, Dufferin would need to gain the support of both communities. By all accounts, he was highly successful in this regard, and gained substantial support from all communities in India. He advanced the cause of the Indian Nationalists greatly during his term, without antagonising the conservative whites. Among other things, the Indian National Congress was founded during his term in 1885, and he laid the foundations for the modern Indian Army by establishing the Imperial Service Corps, officered by Indians.

He was frequently occupied with external affairs during his tenure. He handled the Panjdeh Incident of 1885 in Afghanistan, in which Russian forces encroached into Afghan territory around the Panjdeh oasis. Britain and Russia had for decades been engaged in a virtual cold war in Central Asia and India, known as the Great Game, and the Panjdeh incident threatened to precipitate a full-blown conflict. Dufferin negotiated a settlement in which Russia kept Panjdeh but relinquished the furthest territories it had taken in its advance. His tenure also saw the annexation of Upper Burma in 1886, after many years of simmering warfare and British interventions in Burmese politics.

In 1888, he published the Report on the Conditions of the Lower Classes of Population in Bengal (known as the Dufferin Report). The report highlighted the plight of the poor in Bengal, and was used by nationalists to counter the Anglo-Indian claim that British rule had been beneficial to the poorest members of Indian society. Following publication of the report, Dufferin recommended the establishment of provincial and central councils with Indian membership, a key demand of Congress at that time.

His time as Viceroy of India featured in the Rudyard Kipling poem 'One Viceroy Resigns', which was written from Dufferin's point of view, giving advice to his successor, Lord Lansdowne.

His wife Lady Dufferin, Vicereine of India, accompanied her husband on his travels in India and made her own name as a pioneer in the medical training of women in India. Her extensive travel writings and photographs, in addition to her medical work, challenge some traditional assumptions about the role of women in colonial life.

== Later life ==
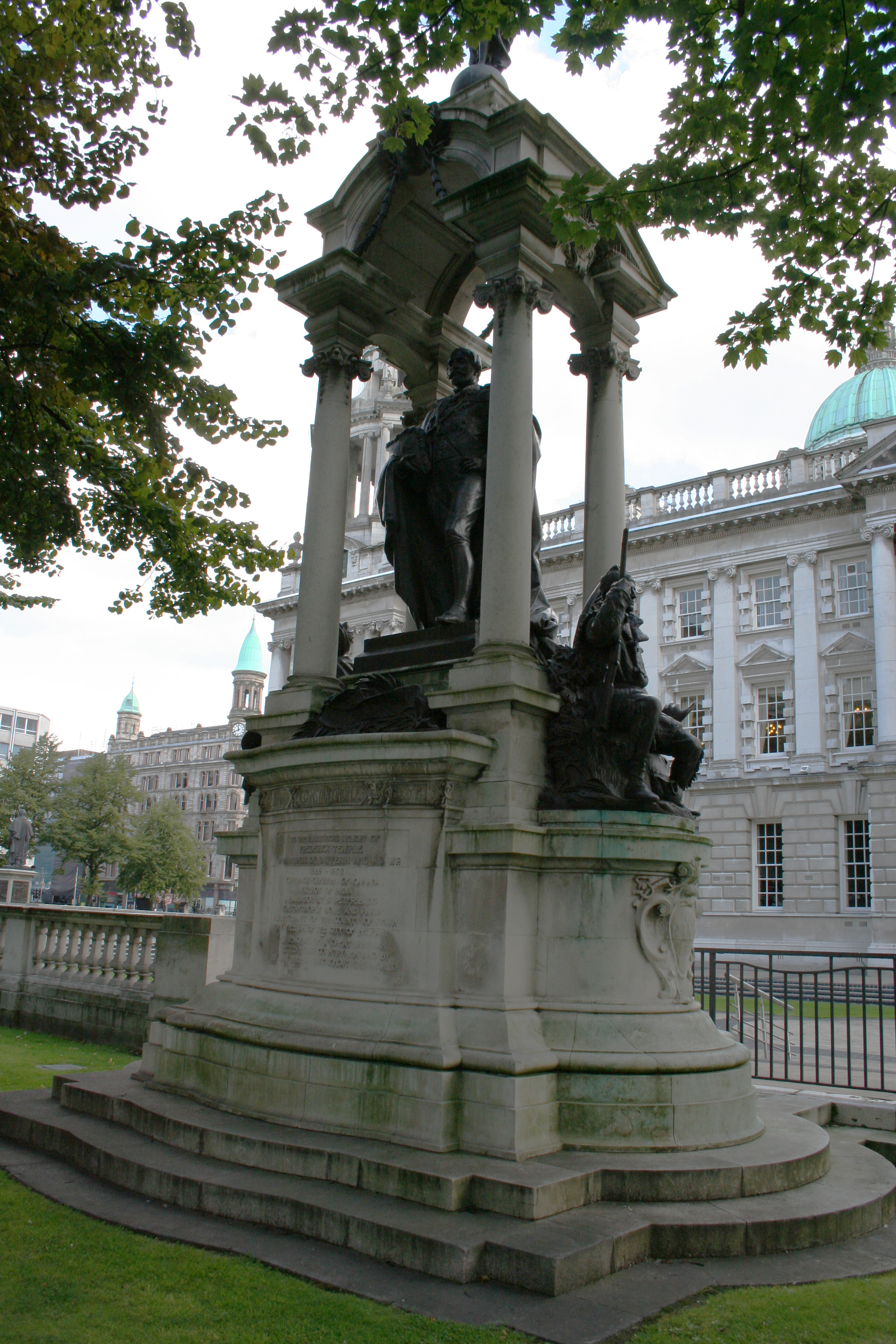
Monument to Frederick, Lord Dufferin, in the grounds of Belfast City Hall, Northern Ireland

Following his return from India, Dufferin resumed his ambassadorial career, serving as ambassador to Italy from 1888 to 1891. On 17 November 1888, he was advanced in the peerage as Marquess of Dufferin and Ava, in the County of Down and the Province of Burma, and Earl of Ava, in the Province of Burma. As ambassador to France from 1891 to 1896, he presided over some difficult times in Anglo-French relations, and was accused by some sections of the French press of trying to undermine Franco-Russian relations. During this time he helped establish the Anglo-French Guild which has since evolved into the University of London Institute in Paris (ULIP). After returning from France, Dufferin became President of the Royal Geographical Society, and Rector of the University of Edinburgh and the University of St Andrews. He received the honorary Doctor of Laws (LL.D) from the University of Glasgow in June 1901.

Throughout his life, Dufferin was known for living beyond his means and had heavily mortgaged his estates to fund his lifestyle and improvements to the estates. In 1875, with his debts approaching £300,000, he was facing insolvency and was forced to sell substantial amounts of land to pay off his creditors. After he retired from the diplomatic service in 1896, he received several offers from financial speculators hoping to use his high reputation to attract investors to their companies. In 1897, worried about the family's financial situation, he was persuaded to become chairman of the London and Globe Finance Corporation, a mining promotion and holding company controlled by Whitaker Wright, but in November 1900 shares in the company crashed and led to its insolvency. It subsequently transpired that Wright was a consummate fraudster. Dufferin lost substantial money on his holdings in the company, but was not guilty of any deception and his moral standing remained unaffected.

Soon after this misfortune, Dufferin's eldest son, Lord Ava, was killed in the Boer War. Dufferin returned to his country house at Clandeboye, near Bangor, in poor health, and died on 12 February 1902. Lady Dufferin died on 25 October 1936.

== Dufferin and the ghost ==
Dufferin often told a tale of how he once saw a ghost which saved his life. Late one night in 1849, while staying in a house in Tullamore, County Offaly, Ireland, he heard a hearse draw up, and looked down and saw a man walking across the lawn carrying a coffin on his back. The man stopped and looked up at Dufferin and their eyes met for a moment, before he continued on into the shadows and disappeared. Dufferin thought the whole event might have been just a bad dream, but the next morning his hostess assured him that the next time he saw the apparition, he would die.

Some years later Dufferin – by this point, the British ambassador to France – recognised the lift operator at the Grand Hotel in Paris as the man he had seen in the garden in Ireland. He refused to get into the lift and a moment later it crashed, killing the occupants including the mysterious man, who had only begun work at the hotel that morning.

French journalist Paul Heuzé demonstrated that up to the time of his research in 1922, only one person had been killed in a Grand Hotel lift accident, in 1878, years before Dufferin was in Paris. A more recent investigation by BBC researcher Melvin Harris demonstrated that the story was an urban legend which Dufferin improved upon by telling as a personal anecdote.

The story itself was retold by E. F. Benson in his short story "The Bus-Conductor" in 1906, and was adapted in a segment of the 1945 anthology film, Dead of Night. It was again retold by Bennett Cerf in his 1944 collection Famous Ghost Stories, which in turn was adapted in the 1961 episode "Twenty Two" of The Twilight Zone. It was again published in Scary Stories to Tell in the Dark.

== Arms ==
Coat of arms of Frederick Hamilton-Temple-Blackwood, 1st Marquess of Dufferin and Ava
Coronet A coronet of a marquess Crest 1st: On a Cap of Maintenance Gules turned up Ermine a Crescent Argent (Blackwood); 2nd, On a Ducal Coronet Or a Martlet Gold (Temple); 3rd, a Demi-Antelope affrontée Ermine attired and unguled Or holding between his hoofs a Heart Gules (Hamilton, Earl of Clanbrassill) Escutcheon Quarterly, 1st and 4th, Azure a Fess Or in chief a Crescent Argent between two Mullets of the second and in base a Mascle of the third (Blackwood); 2nd, quarterly, 1st and 4th, Or an Eagle displayed Sable, 2nd and 3rd, Argent two Bars Sable each charged with three Martlets Or (Temple); 3rd, Gules three Cinquefoils pierced Ermine on a Chief Or a Lion passant of the field (Hamilton, Earl of Clanbrassill) Supporters Dexter: a Lion Gules armed and langued Azure gorged with a Tressure flory-counterflory Or; Sinister: an Heraldic Tiger Ermine gorged with a like Tressure Gules; each supporter supporting a Flag Staff proper therefrom flowing a Banner Or charged with a Peacock in his Pride also proper Motto Per Vias Rectas (By straight ways)

== Honorific eponyms ==
Ship

- IMMTS Dufferin

Geographic locations

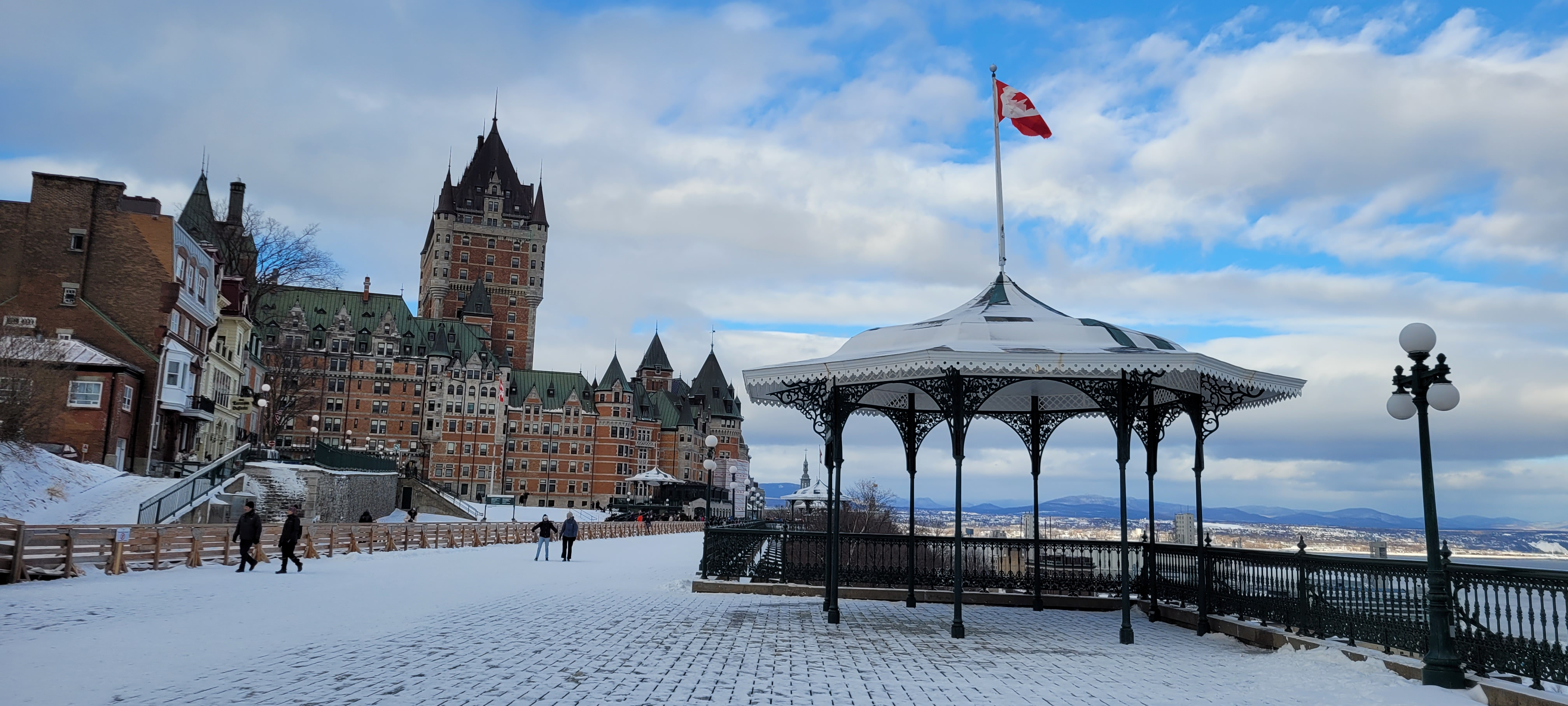
Terrasse Dufferin-Historic District of Old Québec

- British Columbia: Dufferin Island
- Dublin: Dufferin Avenue
- Manitoba: Dufferin Avenue, Winnipeg
- Nova Scotia: Dufferin Street, Bridgewater
- Ontario: Dufferin County
- Ontario: Dufferin Street, Toronto
- Ontario: Dufferin Street, Perth
- Ontario: Dufferin Islands, Queen Victoria Park, Niagara Falls
- Ontario: Dufferin Subway Station, Toronto Transit Commission, Toronto, Ontario
- Quebec: Autoroute Dufferin-Montmorency, Quebec City
- Quebec: Terrasse Dufferin, Quebec City
- Saskatchewan: Dufferin Avenue, Imperial
- South Australia: County of Dufferin
- Spitsbergen: Kapp Dufferin
- Mandalay, Burma: Fort Dufferin

Political offices
Preceded by The Lord Wodehouse	Under-Secretary of State for India; 1864–1866	Succeeded by James Stansfeld
Preceded by Marquess of Hartington	Under-Secretary of State for War; 1866–1866	Succeeded by The Earl of Longford
Preceded by Thomas Edward Taylor	Chancellor of the Duchy of Lancaster; 1868–1872	Succeeded by Hugh Childers
Preceded by Sir Stephen Cave	Paymaster General; 1868–1872	Succeeded by Hugh Childers
Government offices
Preceded by The Lord Lisgar	Governor General of Canada; 1872–1878	Succeeded by Marquess of Lorne
Preceded by The Marquess of Ripon	Viceroy of India; 1884–1888	Succeeded by The Marquess of Lansdowne
Diplomatic posts
Preceded by Lord Augustus Loftus	British Ambassador to Russia; 1879–1881	Succeeded by Sir Edward Thornton
Preceded by Sir Henry Layard	British Ambassador to the Ottoman Empire; 1881–1884	Succeeded by Sir Edward Thornton
Preceded by Sir John Savile	British Ambassador to Italy; 1888–1892	Succeeded by The Lord Vivian
Preceded by The Earl of Lytton	British Ambassador to France; 1891–1896	Succeeded by Sir Edmund Monson
Academic offices
Preceded by Arthur Balfour	Rector of the University of St Andrews; 1889–1892	Succeeded by The Marquess of Bute
Preceded by The Lord Balfour of Burleigh	Rector of the University of Edinburgh; 1899–1902	Succeeded by Sir Robert Bannatyne Finlay
Honorary titles
Preceded by The 4th Marquess of Londonderry	Lord Lieutenant of Down; 1864–1902	Succeeded by The 6th Marquess of Londonderry
Preceded by William Henry Smith	Lord Warden of the Cinque Ports; 1892–1895	Succeeded by The Marquess of Salisbury
Peerage of the United Kingdom
New creation	Marquess of Dufferin and Ava; 1888–1902	Succeeded by Terence Hamilton-Temple-Blackwood
New creation	Earl of Dufferin; 1871–1902	Succeeded by Terence Hamilton-Temple-Blackwood
New creation	Baron Claneboye; 1850–1902	Succeeded by Terence Hamilton-Temple-Blackwood
Peerage of Ireland
Preceded by Price Blackwood	Baron Dufferin and Claneboye; 1841–1902	Succeeded by Terence Hamilton-Temple-Blackwood
