= Nicholas Fairfax, 14th Lord Fairfax of Cameron =

British peer and politician

The Right Honourable The Lord Fairfax of Cameron
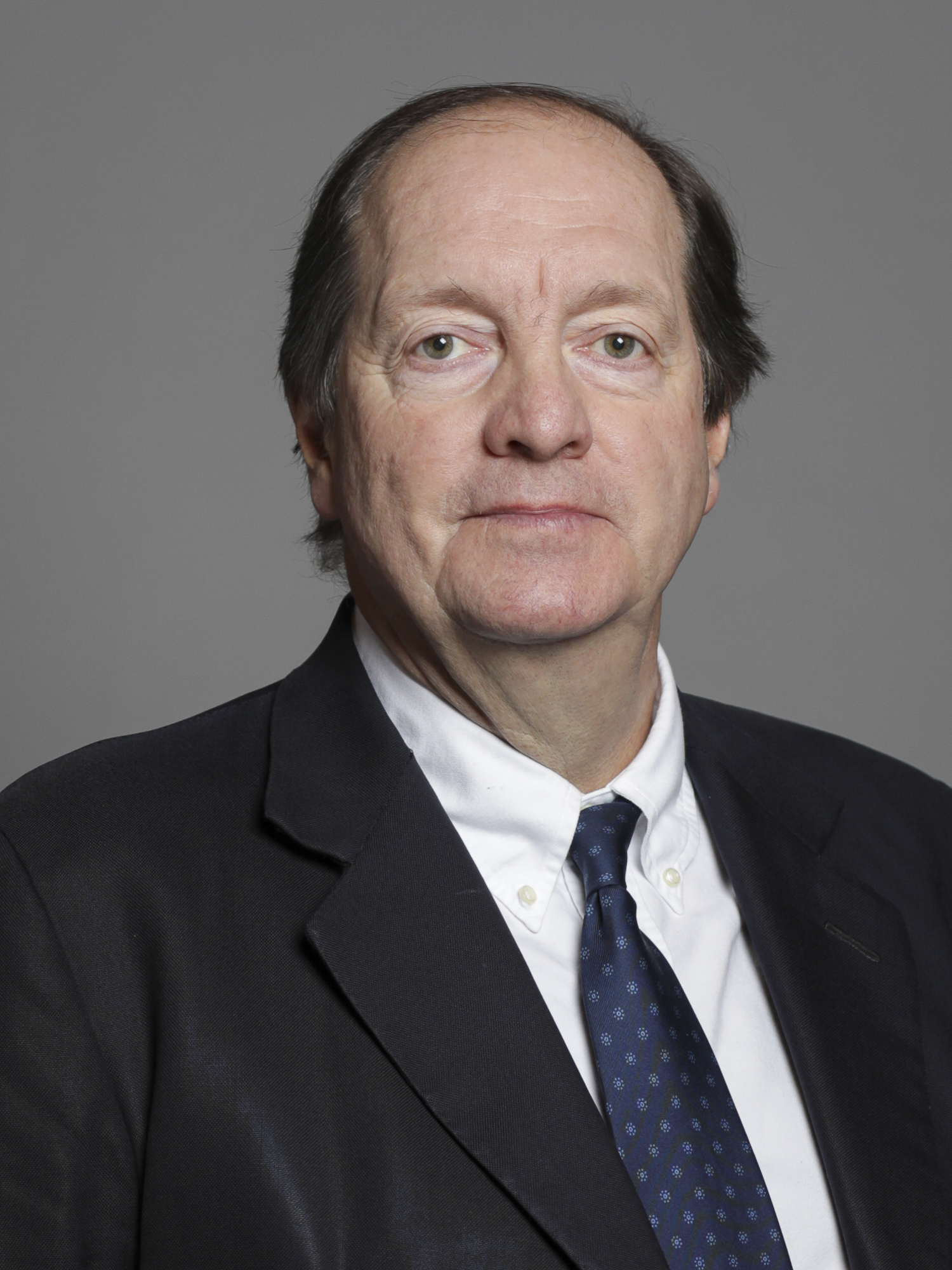
- Official portrait, 2020

Member of the House of Lords
- Lord Temporal
- Hereditary peerage 16 February 1977 – 11 November 1999
- Preceded by: The 13th Lord Fairfax of Cameron
- Succeeded by: Seat abolished
- Elected Hereditary Peer; 26 November 2015 – 29 April 2026
- By-election: 2015
- Preceded by: The 3rd Baron Montagu of Beaulieu
- Succeeded by: Seat abolished

Personal details
- Born: Nicholas John Albert Fairfax; 4 January 1956 (age 70)
- Party: Conservative
- Spouse: Annabella Ruth Morriss (m. 1982)
- Parent(s): Thomas Fairfax, 13th Lord Fairfax of Cameron; Sonia Helen Gunston
- Education: Downing College

Nicholas John Albert Fairfax, 14th Lord Fairfax of Cameron (born 4 January 1956) is a British peer and Conservative politician. He is the current holder of the title of Lord Fairfax of Cameron, succeeding his father, Thomas Fairfax, 13th Lord Fairfax of Cameron, in 1964.

== Early life and education ==
Nicholas John Albert Fairfax was born 4 January 1956, the eldest son of Thomas Fairfax, 13th Lord Fairfax of Cameron (1923–1964), and his wife, Sonia Helen Gunston (1927–2017). Fairfax was educated at Eton and Downing College, Cambridge (LLB in International Law), is a barrister and was called to the Bar following becoming a member of Gray's Inn (1977).

== Career ==
Lord Fairfax's directorships of several companies are as follows: Thomas Miller P and I, and Thomas Miller Defence, 1987–1990; Sedgwick Marine & Cargo Ltd, 1995–1996; British-Georgian Soc. Ltd, 2006; Sovcomflot (UK) Ltd, since 2005; Sovcomflot, 2007. He is Patron of AMUR Tiger and Leopard Charity, 2006. He is a Freeman of the City of London and a Liveryman of the Shipwrights' Company.

He was a member of the House of Lords first from 1977 to 1999. In November 2015, he was elected to return to the House at a Conservative hereditary peers' by-election, following the death of Lord Montagu of Beaulieu (1926–2015).

In 2020, Lord Fairfax endorsed Justin Fairfax, Lieutenant Governor of the U.S. state of Virginia, in his bid for Governor in the 2021 Virginia gubernatorial election. Lt. Gov. Fairfax's great-great-great-grandfather was a slave manumitted by Thomas Fairfax, 9th Lord Fairfax of Cameron, an ancestor of Nicholas. (The 9th Lord was a Swedenborgian, and manumitted all his slaves.)

== Personal life ==
In 1982, he married Annabella Ruth Morriss (born 13 January 1957), eldest daughter of Nicholas and of Sarah Gilham Morriss, of Newmarket, by whom he has three sons:

- Hon. Edward Nicholas Thomas Fairfax
- Hon. John Frederick Anthony Fairfax
- Hon. Rory Henry Francis Fairfax

His heir apparent to the title and the Master of Fairfax is his eldest son, the Hon. Edward Nicholas Thomas Fairfax.

Peerage of Scotland
| Preceded by Thomas Fairfax | Lord Fairfax of Cameron; 1964–present Member of the House of Lords (1977–1999) | Incumbent; Heir apparent: Hon. Edward Fairfax, Master of Fairfax |
Parliament of the United Kingdom
| Preceded by The Lord Montagu of Beaulieu | Elected hereditary peer to the House of Lords under the House of Lords Act 1999; 2015–2026 | Position abolished under the House of Lords (Hereditary Peers) Act 2026 |
