= Killyleagh Castle =

Castle in the village of Killyleagh, Northern Ireland

- County Down, Northern Ireland in United Kingdom
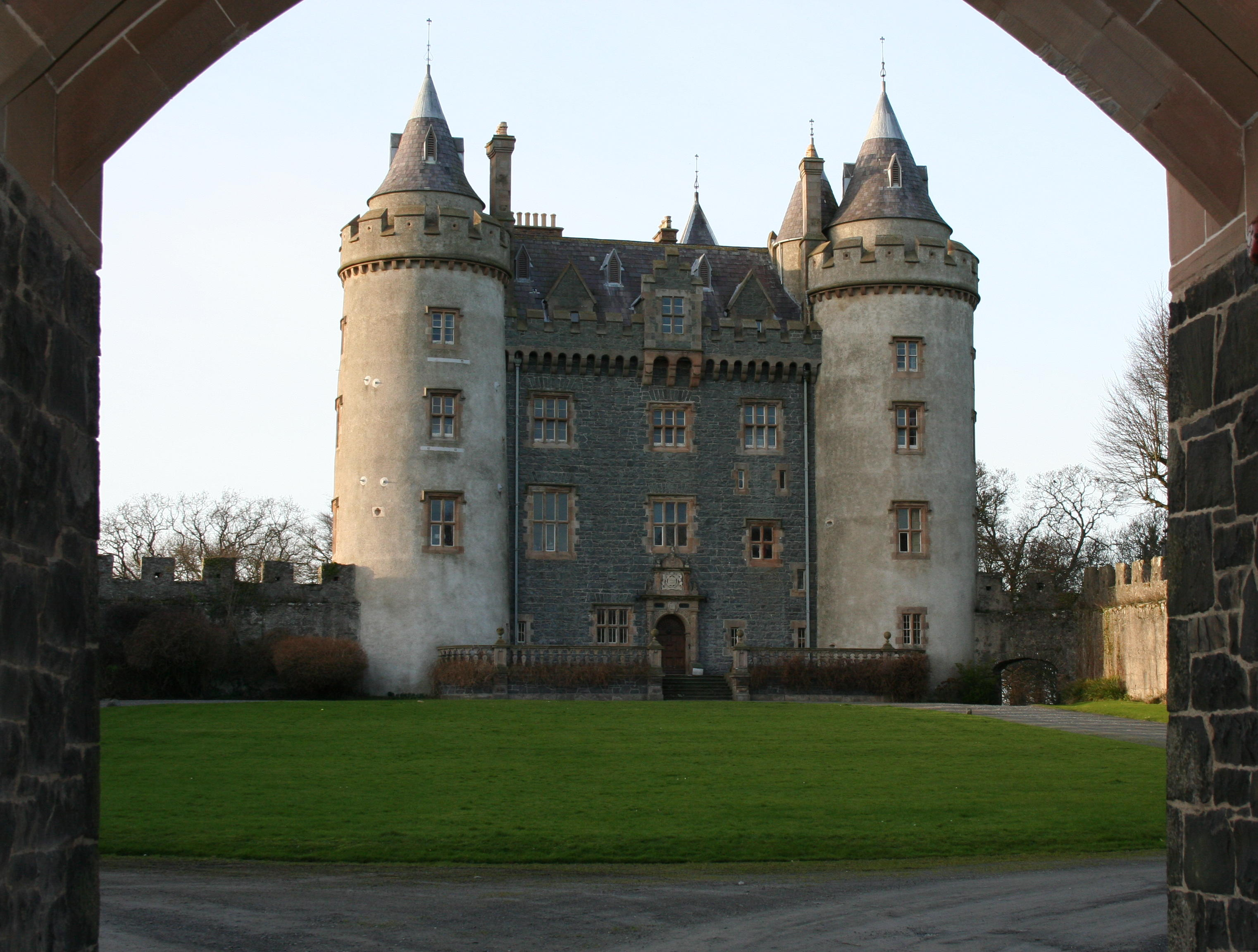
- Keep viewed from the gatehouse

Site information
- Type: Castle
- Owner: Private
- Open to the public: Limited access

Location
- Location within Northern Ireland
- Coordinates: 54°24′9″N 5°39′15″W

Site history
- In use: Late 12th century – present
- Events: English Civil War

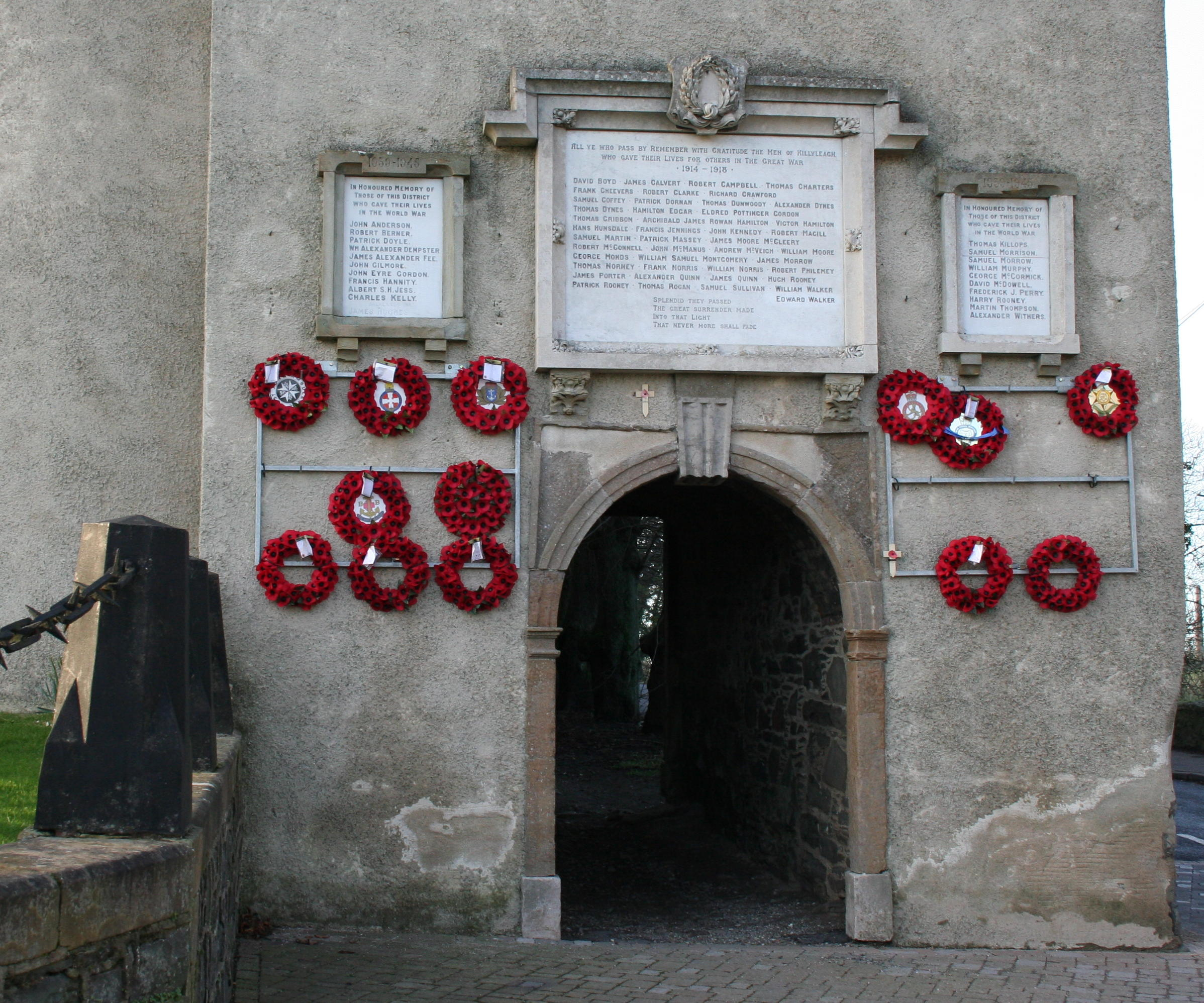
War memorial

Killyleagh Castle is a castle in the village of Killyleagh, County Down, Northern Ireland. It is believed to be one of the oldest inhabited castles in the country, with parts dating back to 1180. It follows the architectural style of a Loire Valley château, being redesigned by the architect Sir Charles Lanyon in the mid-19th century. It has been owned by the Hamilton family since the early 17th century.

It is currently the home of Gawn Rowan Hamilton and his family. The castle hosts occasional concerts; performers have included Van Morrison, Glen Hansard and Bap Kennedy. The gate lodges provide self-catering holiday accommodation. From 2012 to 2014, the castle was used to film CBBC show Dani's Castle.

== History ==
=== 12th century ===
Killyleagh was settled in the late 12th century by Norman knight Sir John de Courcy, who built fortifications on the site of the castle in 1180 as part of a series of fortifications around Strangford Lough, which he had built in order to protect the lands he had seized from the native Irish.

=== 17th century ===
In 1602, Gaelic chieftain Con O'Neill of Clandeboye owned large tracts of North Down, including Killyleagh. O'Neill sent his men to attack English soldiers after a quarrel and was consequently imprisoned. O'Neill's wife made a deal with Scots aristocrat Hugh Montgomery to give him half of O'Neill's lands if Montgomery could get a royal pardon for O'Neill. Montgomery obtained the pardon but King James I divided the land in three, with the area from Killyleagh to Bangor going to another Scot, James Hamilton, later 1st Viscount Claneboye. A map of Killyleagh from 1625 showed the castle as having a single tower on the south side of a residence. In about 1625 Hamilton moved from Bangor to Killyleagh Castle, where he built the courtyard walls. It has been the home of the Hamilton family ever since.

Viscount Claneboye's son, the 1st Earl of Clanbrassil (by the first creation), built the second tower. He supported the Stuart monarch Charles I of England and the castle was besieged in 1649 by Oliver Cromwell's forces who sailed gunboats into Strangford Lough and blew up the gatehouse. The Earl fled, leaving behind his wife and children. Parliament fined him for the return of the castle and his land.

The 1st Earl's son, the 2nd Earl of Clanbrassil (by the first creation), rebuilt the castle in 1666. He erected the north tower and built (or perhaps restored) the long fortified bawn (wall) in the front of the castle. The 2nd Earl's castle is mostly what remains today.

In 1667, the 2nd Earl married Lady Alice Moore, daughter of the Earl of Drogheda, and their only child died in infancy. Lady Alice discovered that her father-in-law, the 1st Earl of Clanbrassil (by the first creation), had stated in his will that should his son, the 2nd Earl, die without issue, the estate should be divided between five Hamilton cousins, the eldest sons of his five uncles. She destroyed the will and had her husband, the 2nd Earl, make his own will in 1674, leaving the estate to her. Henry, Lord Clanbrassil, died of poisoning in 1675, then Lady Alice died in 1677, leaving the estate to her brother. The cousins, however, were aware of the 1st Earl's will, and pursued their rights as inheritors. The matter was concluded 20 years later when a copy of the original will was discovered. By then, the cousins were all dead. The last to die was James Hamilton of Neilsbrook, County Antrim, son of Archibald Hamilton, the next brother of the 1st Viscount Claneboye. James Hamilton of Neilsbrook had been confident of a settlement in his favour and had bequeathed the estate to be divided in two, with one half going to his daughter Anne Stevenson (née Hamilton), and the other half to his younger brothers Gawn and William Hamilton. In 1697, the probate court divided the castle, with Gawn and William gaining the main house and the two towers and their niece Anne receiving the bawn and gate house. Gawn and William had to open a new entrance on the north side in order to enter their castle.

=== 18th and 19th centuries ===
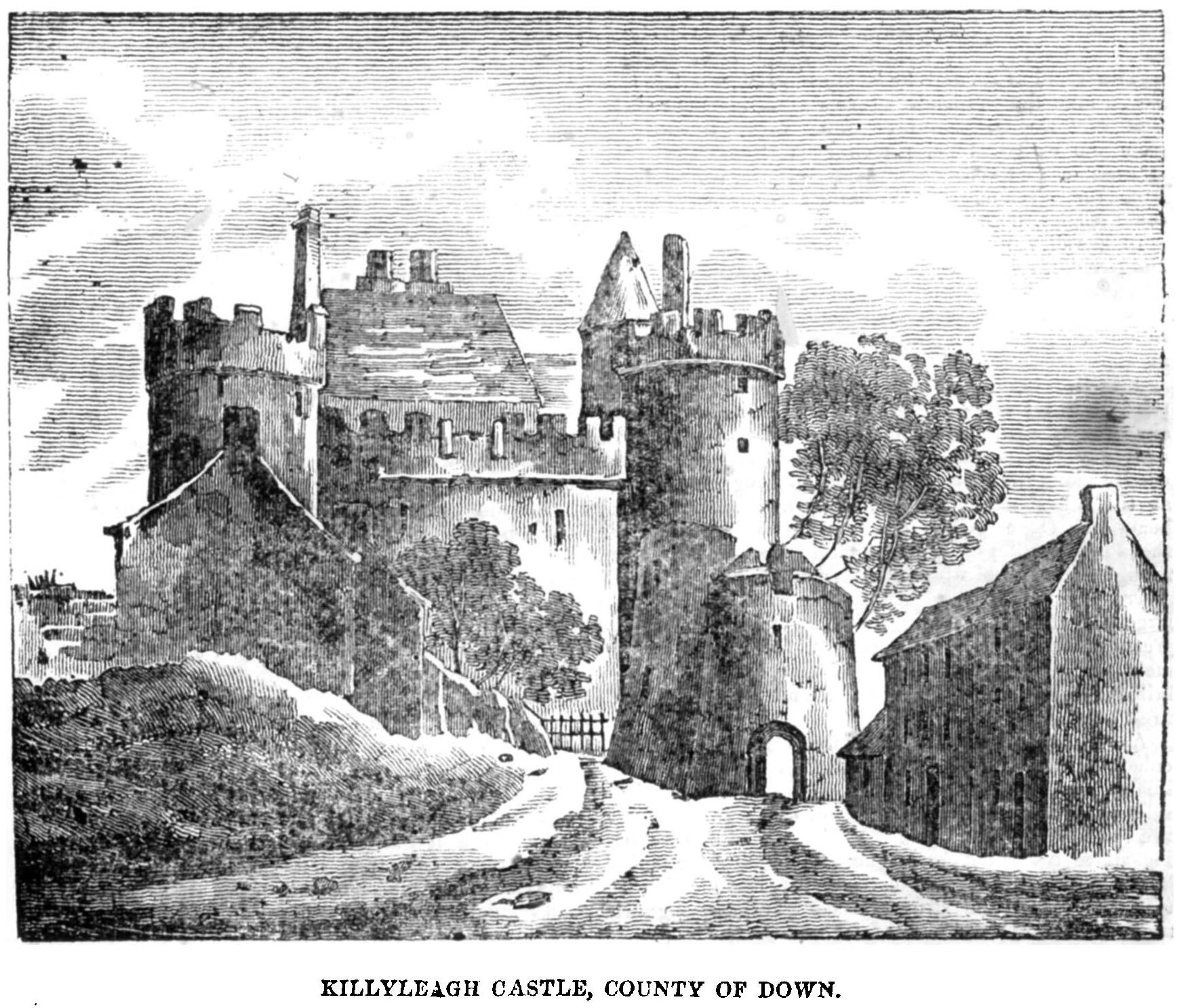
The castle in 1833, Dublin Penny Journal

William died without children in 1716 and the castle passed to successive generations of Gawn Hamilton's descendants. Gawn's great-grandson, Archibald Hamilton Rowan, an Irish nationalist of the United Irishmen, lived in the castle as one of his homes between 1806 and 1834 after his return from exile in America.

Hamilton Rowan's grandson, Archibald Rowan-Hamilton, and his wife employed architect and engineer Sir Charles Lanyon from 1850 to renovate the castle, creating its romantic silhouette with the addition of the turrets.

James Hamilton of Neilsbrook's daughter Anne married Hans Stevenson, and her estate passed to her son James Stevenson, then to his daughter Dorcas, later the 1st Baroness Dufferin and Claneboye (1726–1807), and on to Dorcas's great-grandson, the 5th Baron Dufferin and Claneboye (later created the 1st Marquess of Dufferin and Ava; 1826–1902). In 1860, the 5th Baron gave the bawn and gate house to the Hamiltons and commissioned a replacement gate house to better match the main castle. The Baron added Hamilton to his surname just before marrying his distant cousin Hariot Georgina Rowan-Hamilton, daughter of Archibald Rowan-Hamilton, in 1862.

=== 20th century ===
The castle came under attack by the Irish Republican Army (IRA) in the early 1920s. Gawn Rowan Hamilton has said: "I have a cutting from the Belfast Telegraph which tells the story of my great-great uncle being woken at 2 am and exchanging gunfire from the battlements, which was terribly exciting."

== Architecture ==
The architecture of the castle has no traces of an Irish tower house or castle. Benjamin Ferrey created a baronial gatehouse to match the two surviving corner towers to the castle. Lanyon's imposing doorcase was a celebration of Rowan-Hamilton's access through their front door for the first time in almost 200 years. The heavy plasterwork is by Mr. Fulton. Drawing room, dining room and library interconnect and look south into the garden. Lanyon retained the vaulted rooms in the northern circular tower and the pentagonal rooms in its Georgian counterpart. He re-encased the entire exterior while respecting the original fenestration. At roof level he provided a flurry of candle snuffers.
