= Blackwood baronets =

Set index for Blackwood baronets

There have been two Blackwood baronetcies, one in the Baronetage of Ireland and one in the Baronetage of the United Kingdom. Both titles are now merged with that of the Baron Dufferin and Claneboye.

- Blackwood baronets of Killyleagh (1763): see Baron Dufferin and Claneboye
- Blackwood baronets of the Navy (1814)
