= Robert Blackwood =

Robert Blackwood may refer to:

- Robert Blackwood (Irish MP) (1752–1785), MP for Killyleagh, son of the above
- Robert Blackwood (Australian politician) (1861–1940), Australian politician, businessman and pastoralist
- Sir Robert Blackwood (engineer) (1906–1982), first Chancellor of Monash University, Australia (1958–1968)
- Sir Robert Blackwood, 1st Baronet (1694–1774)
- Robert Blackwood of Pitreavie (1624–1720), Lord Provost of Edinburgh, 1711–1713
- Bobby Blackwood (1934–1997), Scottish footballer
