= Hans Blackwood, 3rd Baron Dufferin and Claneboye =

Irish peer and politician

Hans Blackwood, 3rd Baron Dufferin and Claneboye (1758 – 18 November 1839), styled The Honourable Hans Blackwood between 1800 and 1836, was an Irish peer and politician.

== Background ==
Blackwood was the fourth son of Sir John Blackwood, 2nd Baronet and Dorcas Blackwood, 1st Baroness Dufferin and Claneboye.

== Public life ==
Blackwood represented Killyleagh in the Irish House of Commons between 1799 and 1800. From 1813 to 1832 he was a Commissioner of Audit of Ireland. He succeeded his elder brother James in the barony in 1836. This was an Irish peerage and did not entitle him to an automatic seat in the House of Lords.

== Family ==
Lord Dufferin and Claneboye married firstly on 19 June 1784, Mehetabel Hester Temple (who died on 7 February 1798), second daughter and co-heir of Robert Temple, elder brother of Sir John Temple, Bt. and a lineal descendant of the ancient family of Temple of Stowe, and had issue:

- Robert Temple Blackwood (13 July 1788 – 18 June 1815), a captain in the 69th Foot and killed at the Battle of Waterloo
- Hans Blackwood (28 September 1792 – ?), who died unmarried
- Price Blackwood, 4th Baron Dufferin and Claneboye
- Henrietta Blackwood, who married in April 1807 William Stewart Hamilton, of Brown's Hall, County Donegal

He married secondly on 8 July 1801, Elizabeth Finlay (who died in July 1843), eldest daughter and co-heir of William Henry Finlay, of Gennetts, County Meath, and had by her, with five daughters, issue:

- Reverend William Stear Blackwood (27 April 1802 – 28 May 1874), Vicar of Ballinderry, County Antrim, who married firstly on 24 March 1832, Elizabeth Hamilton, daughter of Robert Hamilton, of Clonsilla, County Dublin, and had issue:
  - Hans Stevenson Blackwood (1833–1897), who married firstly in 1862 Jane West (who died 1 December 1890), youngest daughter of Admiral of the Fleet Sir John West GCB, and married secondly on 6 January 1892, Mary Emily Hunt, only daughter of Henry Hunt JP, of Hunningham, Warwickshire, and had one son, Henry Stear Blackwood (1894–1917), educated at Eton College and was a captain in the 9th Battalion of the London Regiment and died from wounds received in action;
  - Robert William Blackwood (1840–1909), a Lieutenant Colonel and former major in the 2nd Battalion of the Oxford Light Infantry and was married on 19 April 1879, to Mary Elizabeth Taylor, daughter of Simon Watson Taylor, of Erlestoke Park, Wiltshire, and had issue: (a) William Stear Blackwood (1880–1889), (b) Robert Montagu Blackwood (1881–1951), Lieutenant, Sherwood Foresters, District Commissioner in Nigeria 1905–1918, Captain commanding an RAF squadron 1918–1919 and married on 29 April 1925, Daisy Kelsey, daughter of Thomas Kitching Kelsey (c) Hans Frederick Blackwood MC (1887–1936), Lieutenant Colonel, The Green Howards, served and wounded in the First World War and died unmarried; (d) Elizabeth Mary Blackwood (1909–?), who married on 21 April 1909, Marcus Leonard Theodore Hare (who died in 1939), of Forest House, Chigwell Row, Essex and had issue;
  - Price Frederick Blackwood (11 October 1841 – 1 December 1930), Major, Royal Artillery, JP for Berkshire and Northamptonshire, and married on 14 July 1880, Henrietta Cator (who died on 7 December 1936), the only child of Albemarle Bertie Cator, and had issue: (a) Albemarle Price Blackwood (1881–1921) DSO, served in South Africa 1900–1901 and in the First World War (mentioned in dispatches twice), appointed to the Order of the Star of Romania, later Lieutenant Colonel and Major, The Border Regiment, Brigadier General on the General Staff 1919, and married on 28 April 1920, Kyra (who died on 16 January 1937), daughter of Albert Llewelyn Hughes and widow of Serge de Boursac, and had two daughters, Kyra Henrietta (1921–?) who was twice married and had issue, and Ursula Henrietta.
- Henry Stevenson Blackwood (4 August 1819 – 25 October 1865), Captain, 17th Hussars and married on 25 April 1857, Lady Amelia Capel (who died on 29 May 1892), sister of Arthur Algernon Capell, 6th Earl of Essex, and died without issue.

== Arms ==
Coat of arms of Hans Blackwood, 3rd Baron Dufferin and Claneboye

Coronet
A Coronet of an Baron
Crest
1st: On a Cap of Maintenance Gules tuned up Ermine a Crescent Argent
Escutcheon
Azure a Fess Or in chief a Crescent Argent between two Mullets of the second and in base a Mascle of the third
Supporters
Dexter: a Lion Gules gorged with a Tressure flory counterflory Or; Sinister: an Heraldic Tiger Ermine gorged with a like Tressure Gules
Motto
Per Vias Rectas (By straight ways)

== Legacy ==
The residential area Hansfield in Clonsilla in Dublin is called after Hans Blackwood.

Parliament of Ireland
Preceded by Sir John Blackwood, 2nd Bt; James Stevenson Blackwood	Member of Parliament for Killyleagh; 1799–1800; With: Sir James Blackwood, 3rd Bt	Succeeded by Daniel Mussenden; Sir James Blackwood, 3rd Bt
Peerage of Ireland
Preceded by James Blackwood	Baron Dufferin and Claneboye; 1836 – 1839	Succeeded by Price Blackwood
