= Francis Blackwood, 10th Baron Dufferin and Claneboye =

Irish noble

Francis George Blackwood, 10th Baron Dufferin and Claneboye (20 May 1916 – 13 November 1991), known as Sir Francis Blackwood, 7th Baronet, from 1979 until 1988, was a British baronet and a peer in the Peerage of Ireland.

After the extinction of the male line of the fourth Baron Dufferin and Claneboye (and the entirety of the Marquessate of Dufferin and Ava), the Barony of Dufferin and Claneboye reverted to the male line of the youngest son of Dorcas Blackwood, 1st Baroness Dufferin and Claneboye, first in the line. The first Blackwood baronet (of the Navy) was her son, his great-grandfather, Vice-Admiral Sir Henry Blackwood.

== Arms ==
Blackwood of Killyleagh

The arms of the head of the family are blazoned Azure a Fess Or in chief a Crescent Argent between two Mullets of the second and in base a Mascle of the third; for supporters Dexter a Lion Gules gorged with a Tressure flory counterflory Or; Sinister an Heraldic Tiger Ermine gorged with a like Tressure Gules. The crest is On a Cap of Maintenance Gules turned up Ermine a Crescent Argent out of the Coronet of a Baron. The motto is “Per Vias Rectas”, meaning “By straight ways”.

Peerage of Ireland
Preceded by Sheridan Hamilton-Temple-Blackwood	Baron Dufferin and Claneboye; 1988–1991	Succeeded by John Blackwood
Baronetage of the United Kingdom
Preceded by Francis Blackwood	Baronets (of the Navy); 1979–1991	Succeeded by John Blackwood
