= Francis Blackwood =

Francis Blackwood may refer to:

- Francis Price Blackwood (1809–1854), British naval officer who spent most of his time in colonial Australia
- Francis Blackwood, 10th Baron Dufferin and Claneboye (1916–1991), British peer
