= Blackwood baronets of the Navy (1814) =

Escutcheon of the Blackwood baronets of the Navy

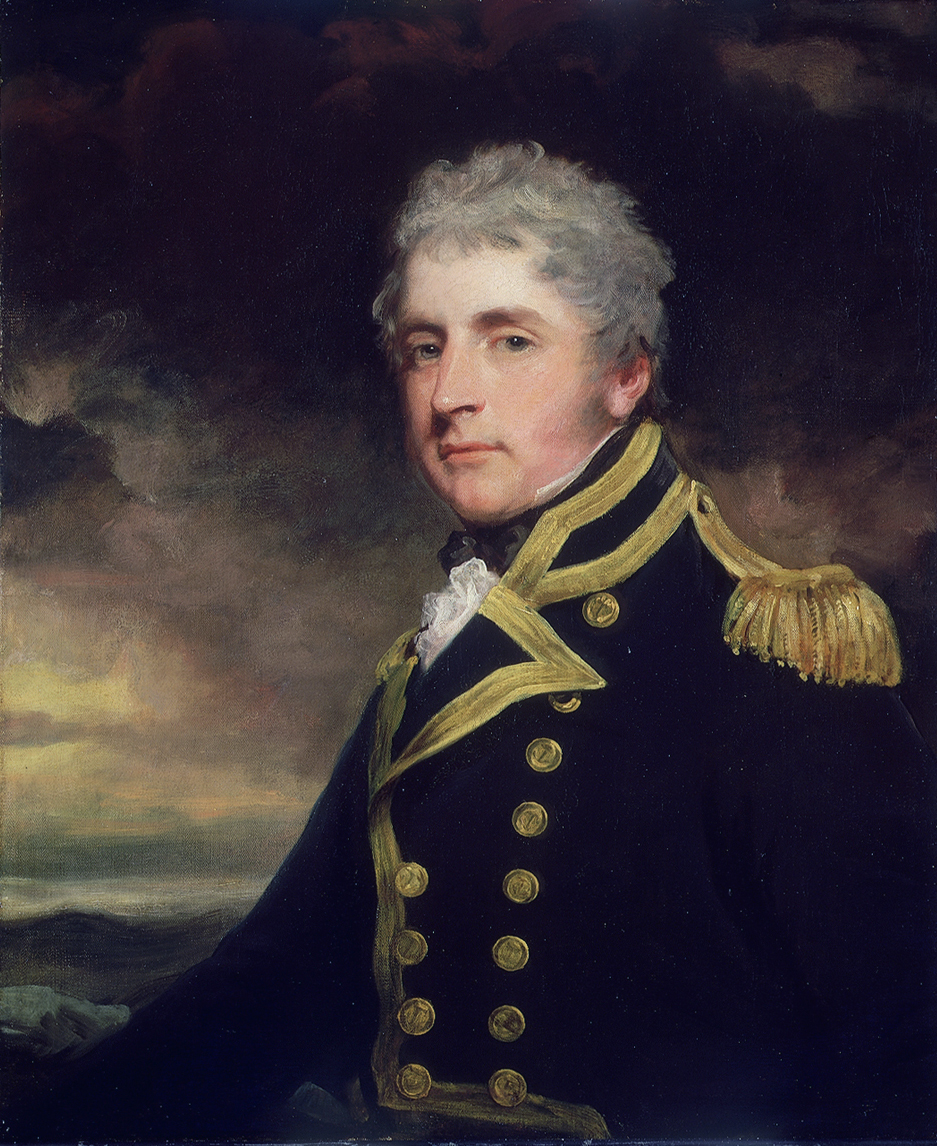
Sir Henry Blackwood, 1st Baronet

The Blackwood baronetcy, of the Navy, was created in the Baronetage of the United Kingdom on 1 September 1814 for the Honourable Henry Blackwood, seventh son of Sir John Blackwood, 2nd Baronet and of Dorcas Blackwood, 1st Baroness Dufferin and Claneboye. He was a Vice-Admiral of the Blue in the Royal Navy and was the bearer of despatches announcing the victory of Trafalgar in 1805. The 7th Baronet succeeded as 10th Baron Dufferin and Claneboye and 11th Baronet of Killyleagh in 1988.

== Blackwood Baronets, of the Navy (1814) ==
- Sir Henry Blackwood, 1st Baronet (1770–1832)
- Sir Henry Martin Blackwood, 2nd Baronet (1801–1851)
- Sir Henry Blackwood, 3rd Baronet (1828–1894)
- Sir Francis Blackwood, 4th Baronet (1838–1924)
- Sir Henry Palmer Temple Blackwood, 5th Baronet (1896–1948)
- Sir Francis Elliot Temple Blackwood, 6th Baronet (1901–1979)
- Sir Francis George Blackwood, 7th Baronet (1916–1991) (succeeded as 10th Baron Dufferin and Claneboye in 1988)

== Notes ==
Baronetage of the United Kingdom
Preceded by Grey baronets	Blackwood baronets of the Navy; 1 September 1814	Succeeded by Dunbar baronets
