= 33rd Light Dragoons =

- Active: 1794–1796
- Allegiance: United Kingdom
- Branch: British Army
- Role: Cavalry
- Size: 6 troops (507 men)
- Colors: Dark blue

Commanders
- Notable commanders: James Stevenson Blackwood; Edward Pakenham

The 33rd Light Dragoons also known as the Ulster Regiment of Light Dragoons was a cavalry regiment of the British Army. It was raised in 1794, by Lieutenant-Colonel James Stevenson Blackwood. It was disbanded shortly afterwards on 26 February 1796.

== Service ==
The 33rd Light Dragoons were raised in County Down in October 1794 by Lieutenant-Colonel James Stevenson Blackwood for the French Revolutionary Wars. The regiment wore a dark blue uniform, including jacket and facings. It initially had a complement of 507 men split into six troops. By 1795 the 33rd was based at Killyleagh, from where it transferred to Scotland, serving at Dumfries in June. The size of the regiment had by this time decreased to 351 men. Moving south, in the following month the regiment was based at Appleby in Lincolnshire. It moved frequently, garrisoning York and Hull in August, Newcastle upon Tyne in September, and Sheffield in December.

At Sheffield the 33rd received orders for foreign service. In response the men mutinied, and instead continued at Sheffield into 1796. By March the regiment was at Coventry and Warwick, before moving on to Nottingham where it was disbanded later in the month. The remaining fit men of the regiment were transferred variously to the 7th, 11th, and 12th Light Dragoons.

== Commanders ==
Blackwood served as Lieutenant Colonel Commandant of the 33rd throughout its existence. Alongside him were two other field officers, Lieutenant-Colonel Nathaniel Massey and Major Edward Pakenham. Both joined the regiment in December 1794; Massey continued with the 33rd until its disbandment when he went on half pay.
