= Archibald Hamilton Rowan =

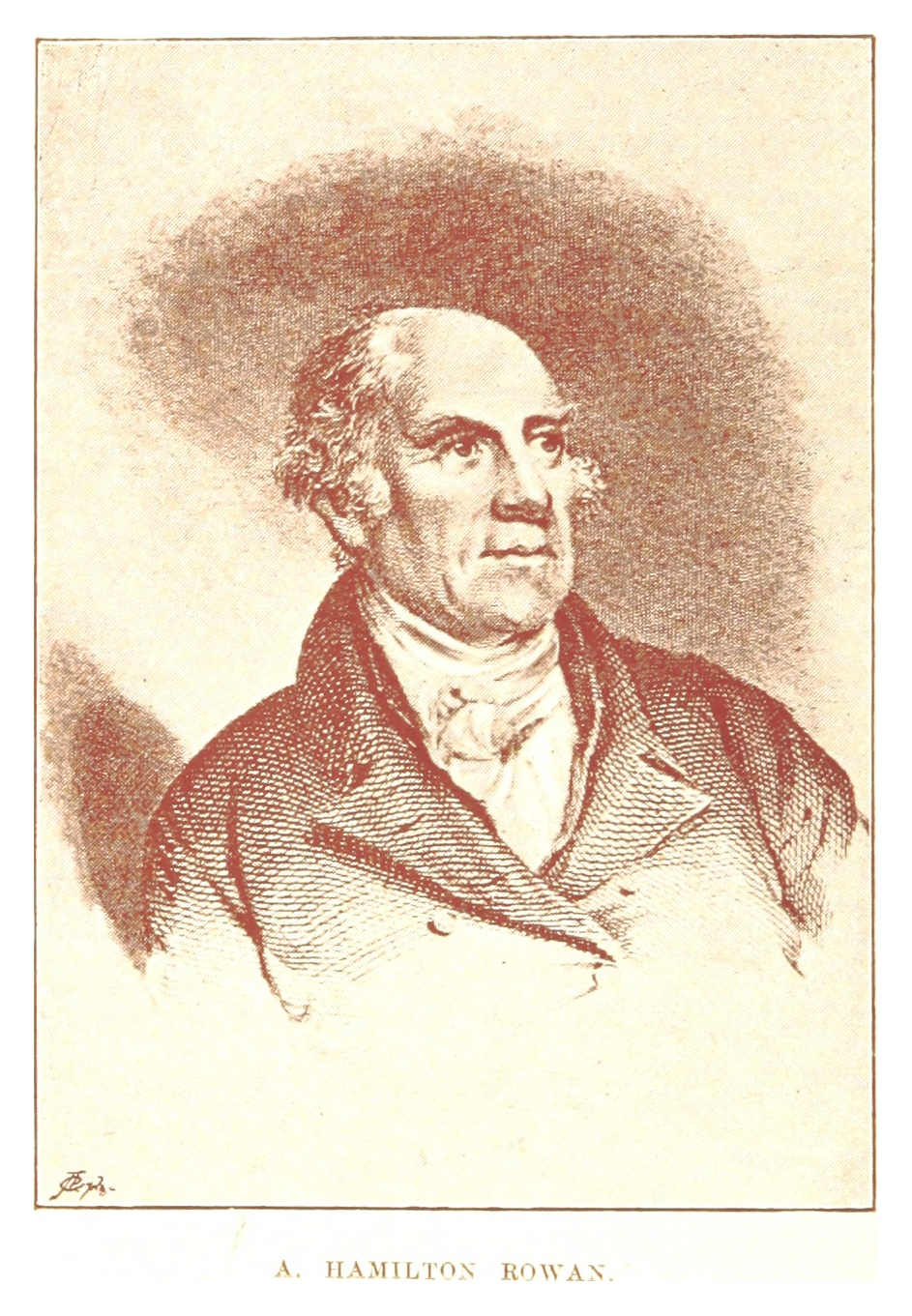
Archibald Hamilton Rowan

Archibald Hamilton Rowan (1 May 1751 – 1 November 1834), christened Archibald Hamilton (sometimes referred to as Archibald Rowan Hamilton), was a founding member of the Dublin Society of United Irishmen, a political exile in France and the United States and, following his return to Ireland in 1806, a celebrated champion of democratic reform.

== Early life ==
Archibald Hamilton Rowan was the son of Gawen Hamilton (1729–1805) of Killyleagh Castle, County Down, in the Kingdom of Ireland, and Jane Rowan Hamilton. He was born in the home of his lawyer grandfather, William Rowan KC, in London, and lived there with his mother and sister for much of his early life. The elder Rowan collected works by republicans of the Cromwellian era such as John Milton, James Harrington, Edmund Ludlow and Algernon Sydney, and by the Irish rationalist philosopher and freethinker, John Toland. These his grandson was to retain in his own extensive library.

When his grandfather died in 1767, he inherited a large sum of money under the stipulations that he would change his name to the maternal surname Rowan, receive an Oxbridge education, and not visit Ireland before his 25th birthday. He was admitted to Westminster School and Queens' College, Cambridge in 1768, but was expelled from the college and rusticated for an attempt to throw a tutor into the River Cam. He was sent for a period in 1769 to Warrington Academy, "the cradle of Unitarianism", though he absented himself from the care of John Seddon of Warrington. Upon his return he obeyed his grandfather's wishes by staying out of Ireland and returning to Jesus College.

Hamilton Rowan travelled throughout the 1770s and 1780s, visiting parts of Europe, the Americas, and Northern Africa. During his travels, he witnessed early signs of revolutionary sentiment in America that may have planted the seeds of revolutionary inclinations that would flower later in his life. While serving as private secretary to Lord Charles Montague, the governor of South Carolina, he witnessed the South Carolina legislature's vote to repaint the railings around the statue of Pitt the Elder, an affront to the ministry of Lord North under which Montague served. Montague dissolved the legislature, only to see all the members re-elected.

In 1781 Hamilton Rowan married Sarah Dawson in Paris, France. Dawson was the daughter of a former neighbour and did not have any fortune of her own. She was brought into the family by Mrs. Hamilton, who took her on as a ward. Mrs. Hamilton thought to make a match for Sarah with the Reverend Benjamin Beresford, but the plan went awry when Beresford eloped with Hamilton Rowan's younger sister. Meanwhile, Hamilton Rowan fell in love with Dawson and married her. The marriage proved to be an enduring love match; Sarah stood by her husband through all his later struggles and was the most important advocate for his pardon during his exile. The couple had ten children. He was the godfather of the Irish mathematician William Rowan Hamilton (1805–1865).

== Volunteer and popular tribune ==
Hamilton Rowan returned to Ireland in his thirties, early in 1784, to live at Rathcoffey near Clane in north County Kildare. He became a celebrity and, despite his wealth and privilege, a strong advocate for Irish independence. In County Down, he joined the Killyleagh Volunteers under his father's command and, in February 1785, as a county delegate to the congress of Volunteers held at the Royal Exchange, Dublin, helped split the movement with a radically democratic proposal. With Lisburn MP, Todd Jones, he spoke not only of abolishing the proprietary boroughs (which gave the aristocracy and the government a stranglehold on the Irish Commons), but also of combining votes for Catholics with a secret ballot that would free them "from the too frequent tyranny" of the typically Protestant landlord".

In 1788, Hamilton Rowan returned to general public notice as the champion of fourteen-year-old Mary Neal and her family. Neal had been lured into a Dublin brothel and then assaulted by Henry Luttrell (who, as Earl of Carhampton, later commanded Crown forces in the suppression of the 1798 Rebellion). Hamilton Rowan publicly denounced Luttrell and published a pamphlet A Brief Investigation of the Sufferings of John, Anne, and Mary Neal in the same year. An imposing figure at more than six feet tall, Hamilton Rowan's notoriety grew when he entered a Dublin dining club threatening several of Mary Neal's detractors, with his massive Newfoundland at his side, and a shillelagh in hand.

== United Irishman ==
In 1790, Hamilton Rowan joined the Northern Whig Club, and in November 1791 became a founding member of the Dublin Society of United Irishmen, working alongside famous radicals such as William Drennan, and Theobald Wolfe Tone. A near-neighbour in Kildare was the local U.I. leader Lord Edward Fitzgerald. Hamilton Rowan was arrested in 1792 for seditious libel when caught distributing Drennan's appeal to the disbanded Irish Volunteers to retain their weapons. Unknown to him, from 1791 the Dublin administration had a spy in the Dublin Society, Thomas Collins, whose activity was never discovered. From February 1793 Britain and Ireland joined the War of the First Coalition against France, and the United Irish movement was outlawed in 1794.

In 1793 in Edinburgh, Thomas Muir, whom Rowan and Drennan had feted in Dublin, with three other of his Friends of the People were sentenced to transportation to Botany Bay (Australia). The judge seized on the United Irishmen papers found in his possession and on Muir's connection to the "ferocious" Mr. Rowan. Rowan, who travelled to Edinburgh, had challenged Robert Dundas, the Lord Advocate of Scotland, to a duel. Upon his return to Dublin, he was charged with seditious libel. At the end of January 1794, notwithstanding representation by the renowned John Philpot Curran, and having refused to resign from the Society of United Irishmen as a condition for being allowed to go into exile, Rowan was sentenced to two years imprisonment and a substantial fine.

== Treason and exile ==
While imprisoned, Hamilton Rowan met the Reverend William Jackson, an Irish-born Anglican clergyman who was working as a spy for the French Committee of Public Safety. Jackson's mission was to assess Ireland's readiness for revolution and French invasion. Jackson, Tone, and others met in Hamilton Rowan's Newgate Prison cell to discuss the state of Ireland and the population's willingness to overthrow British rule. But Jackson was betrayed by a friend acting as a spy for the British Government, and on 28 April 1794 was arrested and charged with high treason. Immediately following Jackson's arrest, Hamilton Rowan fled to escape being tried for high treason. He convinced his jailer to allow him to visit his wife on the pretence of signing legal documents. While the jailer sat in the dining room of their home in Dublin, Hamilton Rowan excused himself to the bedroom, where he climbed down a rope made of knotted bed sheets to a waiting horse. Unwilling to be taken alive, he kept a razor blade in his sleeve and fled south to the coast. A reward of £1000 was offered by Royal Proclamation for his capture. There he hired a boat to sail to France, and upon his arrival, he was immediately arrested as a British spy. While in prison he was interrogated by Robespierre, who found him innocent of the charges raised against him and had Hamilton Rowan freed. In Paris, Hamilton Rowan became close friends with Mary Wollstonecraft and kept a faithful correspondence with her for many years. Hamilton Rowan soon found himself in the middle of the Thermidor Revolution. He recalled:

In two days after the execution of Robespierre, the whole commune of Paris, consisting of about sixty persons, were guillotined in less than one hour and a half, in the Place de la Revolution; and though I was standing above a hundred paces from the place of execution, the blood of the victims streamed under my feet.

Deciding that France was too dangerous, Hamilton Rowan moved next to Philadelphia, then the capital of the United States. He reached Philadelphia on 4 July 1795, reuniting with fellow United Irishmen in exile. To his dismay, he discovered Philadelphia to be as full of backstabbing and partisanship as France (albeit of a less bloody nature). His more radical Irish friends were already inserting themselves into the dispute between Thomas Jefferson's Republican faction against John Adams' Federalists. He chose to leave Philadelphia for the more peaceful and less expensive shores of the Brandywine River in Delaware.

After fleeing Ireland, Hamilton Rowan was unable to access his fortune and was reduced to supporting himself by his own labour. He was able to borrow money from William Poole, a prominent Quaker in Wilmington, Delaware, and purchase a calico mill. In Wilmington, Hamilton Rowan led a very public life, enjoying the company of prominent Wilmingtonians such as Poole, John Dickinson, and Caesar A. Rodney, who later became Secretary of State under Jefferson. Living in constant fear of summary deportation under the Alien and Sedition Acts, Hamilton Rowan took pains to socialise with both Federalists and Republicans, and he studiously avoided American politics. On Christmas Day 1797, his cottage on the Brandywine burned to the ground killing his two dogs, destroying most of his library, and leaving him homeless. The next year his business partner refused to make up the accounts for the calico mill, so Hamilton Rowan was forced to pay the bills out of pocket, and take over the entire operation himself. But with little knowledge of the operations or business, the press was sold at a loss of $500. Hamilton Rowan then worked for the flour mills hauling grain and flour by wheelbarrow to and from Wilmington.

During his time in America, Hamilton Rowan began writing his Memoirs, fearing he would never return to Ireland. He begins with an address to his family,

My dear Children, Whilst residing at Wilmington on the Delaware, in the United States of America, not expecting to return to Europe, and unwilling to solicit my family to rejoin me there, I was anxious to leave you some memorial of a parent whom in all probability you would never know personally.

However, thanks to the persistence of his wife, in 1799 he received permission to travel to a neutral European country without being arrested and he moved from Wilmington to Hamburg, Germany, where he was reunited with his wife and children. He continued to seek a pardon and was permitted to live in England from 1803.

Writing to his father from Hamburg, Hamilton Rowan delighted in the prospect of Ireland's legislative union with Great Britain.:

I congratulate you upon the report that spreads here that Union is intended. In that I see the downfall of one of the most corrupt assembles that ever existed . . . [It will be] the wreck of feudal aristocracy.

It was a view not popular among his fellow Irish exiles.

In 1802 Hamilton Rowan applied directly to Lord Castlereagh, asking for permission to return to England from France. Castlereagh's advisor Lord Hardwicke objected: not only would the minister's intervention "give greatest offence to the loyal", compared to the treatment of "the disaffected who are less well connected" it would "look like a flagrant piece of class distinction".

His father Gawen died in 1805 and Hamilton Rowan was allowed to return to Ireland in 1806.

== Later life ==
Hamilton Rowan returned to the ancestral home of Killyleagh Castle, County Down, receiving a hero's welcome. He was a respected figure, spending time in both Killyleagh and Dublin. While he had agreed to be a model citizen under the conditions of his return to Ireland, he remained active in politics and retained his youthful radicalism.

Following his last public appearance at a meeting in the Rotunda in Dublin "organized by the Friends of Civil and Religious Liberty" on 20 January 1829, he was lifted up by a mob and paraded through the streets. In 1831 in a letter to the Northern Whig (13 October 1831), he protested that he had "ever adhered to the principle which directed the original engagement of the United Irishmen", and proposed "the test of that Society, with some slight alterations, for the adoption of the friends of reform", emphasising, "an impartial representation of British subjects in Parliament", notably this time, with a reference of loyalty to the King.

Preceded by the death of his wife in February 1834 and of his eldest son, Gawen William Rowan Hamilton, in August, Hamilton Rowan died in his home on 1 November 1834. While radical acquaintances like Tone and Jackson died as a result of their political activities, Rowan lived to the age of 84. He was buried in the vaults of St Mary's Church, Dublin.

Hamilton Rowan was unable to finish his memoirs, and after his death, his family handed his papers and the task off to his friend, Thomas Kennedy Lowrey, who was also unable to finish them. Lowrey in turn passed them off to William Hamilton Drummond who published Hamilton Rowan's Autobiography in 1840. Hamilton would have been a member of Rev. Drummond's Strand Street Presbyterian (Unitarian) Church. According to Harold Nicolson (his great-great-grandson), none of Hamilton Rowan's working papers exist, and some of them were burned by either his great-aunt Fanny or his great-aunt Jane.

Hamilton Rowan produced in fact several versions of his memoirs (in varying degrees of completion) at his own lithographic press in Dublin. These can be found in libraries in Ireland (Royal Irish Academy, National Library) and in Wilmington, Delaware (The Historical Society of Delaware). Manuscript versions of the memoirs by various hands (again, in varying degrees of completion) are preserved in the Royal Irish Academy, The Public Record Office of Northern Ireland, and The Delaware Historical Society.

== Bibliography ==
- Hamilton Rowan, Archibald. The Autobiography of Archibald Hamilton Rowan. Shannon: Irish University Press, 1972.
- Nicolson, Harold George. The Desire to Please, A Story of Hamilton Rowan and the United Irishmen. New York: Harcourt, Brace, 1943. London: Constable, 1943.
- Whelan, Fergus. God-Provoking Democrat: The Remarkable Life of Archibald Hamilton Rowan. Stillorgan, Dublin: New Island Books, 2014, ISBN 9781848404601.
