= John Blackwood, 11th Baron Dufferin and Claneboye =

Australian architect, holder of Irish peerage

John Francis Blackwood, 11th Baron Dufferin and Claneboye (born 18 October 1944), is an Australian architect and a peer in the Peerage of Ireland.

The son of the 10th Baron Dufferin and Claneboye (reverted) by his marriage to Margaret Kirkpatrick, he was educated at Barker College, Hornsby, New South Wales, and the University of New South Wales, graduating as a Bachelor of Architecture.

In 1971, Blackwood married Annette Kay Greenhill, a daughter of Harold Greenhill. They have two children, Freya Jodi (born 1975) and Francis Senden Blackwood (born 1979), heir apparent to the peerage.

Blackwood went into private practice as an architect in Orange, New South Wales, and by 1984 was listed as ARAIA. In 1991, he succeeded his father to become the 11th Baron Dufferin and Claneboye, of Ballyleidy and Killyleagh in the County of Down, and also as 12th Baronet of Ballyleidy; however, he did not use either title professionally.

In 2003, Lord Dufferin was still living in Orange, New South Wales.

== Arms ==
Blackwood of Killyleagh

The arms of the head of the family are blazoned Azure a Fess Or in chief a Crescent Argent between two Mullets of the second and in base a Mascle of the third; for supporters Dexter a Lion Gules gorged with a Tressure flory counterflory Or; Sinister an Heraldic Tiger Ermine gorged with a like Tressure Gules. The crest is On a Cap of Maintenance Gules turned up Ermine a Crescent Argent out of the Coronet of a Baron. The motto is “Per Vias Rectas”, meaning “By straight ways”.

== Notes ==
Peerage of Ireland
Preceded by Francis Blackwood	Baron Dufferin and Claneboye; 1991–	Incumbent
Baronetage of the United Kingdom
Preceded by Francis Blackwood	Baronets (of the Navy); 1991–	Incumbent
