= Earl of Clanbrassil =

Title in the Peerage of Ireland

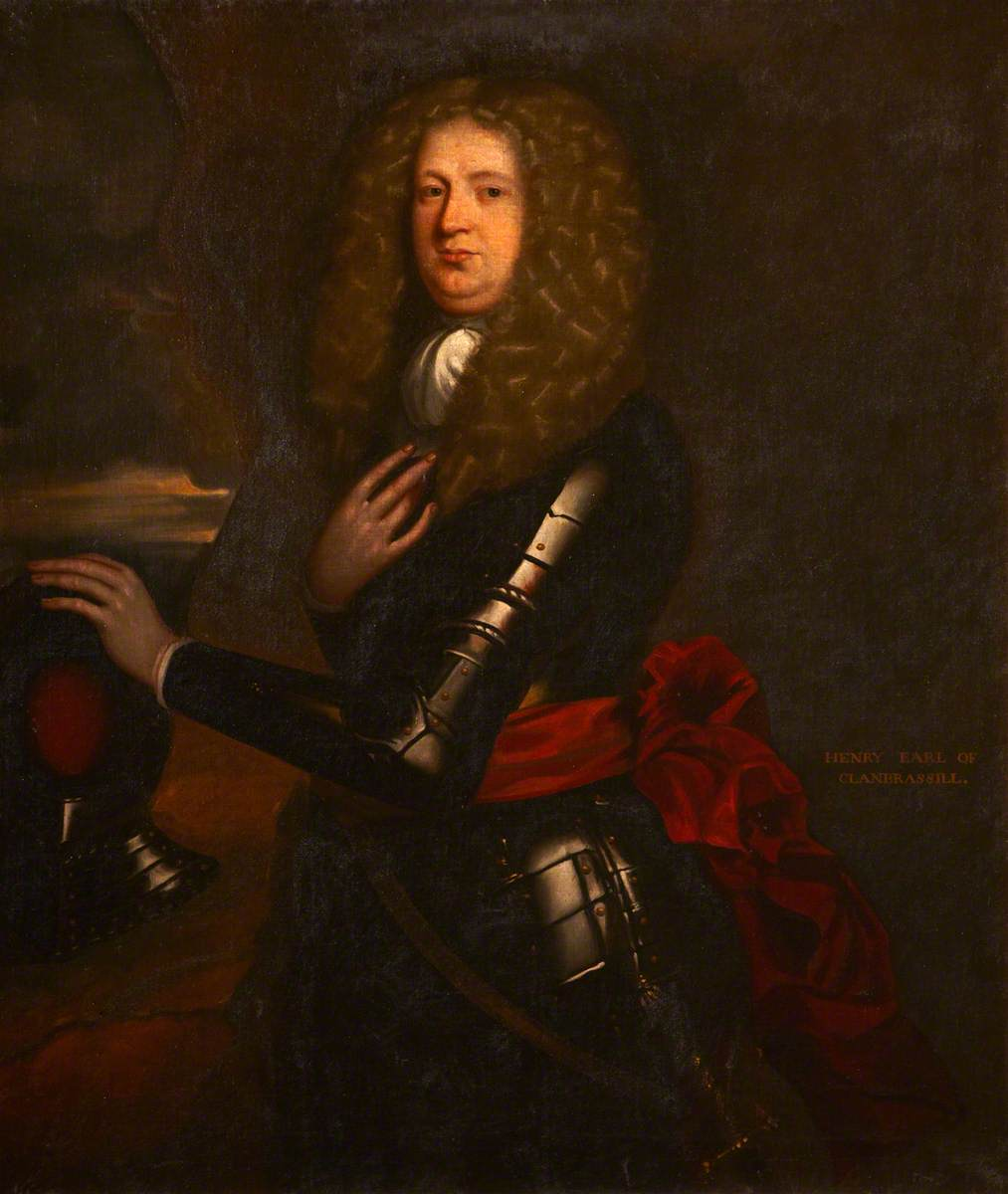
Henry Hamilton, 2nd Earl of Clanbrassil

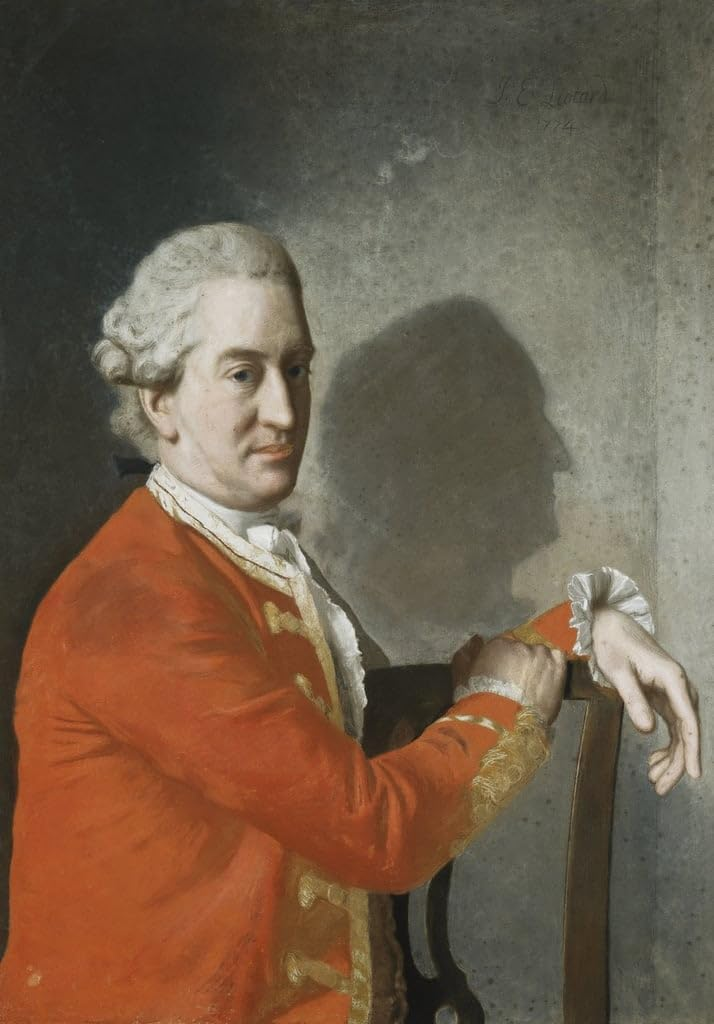
James Hamilton, 2nd Earl of Clanbrassil

Earl of Clanbrassil was a title that was created twice in the Peerage of Ireland, both times for members of the Hamilton family. Clanbrassil is the anglicised name of Clann Bhreasail, an old Gaelic túath or territory in what is now the barony of Oneilland East in the north-east of modern County Armagh in Ulster.

== History ==
On 4 May 1622 Sir James Hamilton was created Viscount Claneboye, in the County of Down, in the Peerage of Ireland. He was succeeded by his only son, James, the second Viscount, who was created Earl of Clanbrassil, in the County of Armagh, on 7 June 1647. The titles became extinct on the early death of his only surviving son, Henry, the second Earl, in 1675.

On 13 May 1719, James Hamilton was created Baron Claneboye, in the County of Down, and Viscount of the City of Limerick (usually shortened to Viscount of Limerick) in the Peerage of Ireland. On 24 November 1756 he was further honoured when he was made Earl of Clanbrassil, in the County of Armagh, also in the Irish peerage. He was the great-great-grandson of William Hamilton, brother of the first Viscount Claneboye. The titles became extinct on the death of his son, James, the second Earl, in 1798.

The Claneboye title was revived in 1800 when the first Viscount Claneboye's great-great-grandniece Dorcas, Lady Blackwood, was made Baroness Dufferin and Claneboye. The Clanbrassil title was revived in 1821 when Robert Jocelyn, 3rd Earl of Roden, was made Baron Clanbrassil in the Peerage of the United Kingdom. He was the grandson of Lady Anne Hamilton, sister of the second and last Earl of Clanbrassil of the second creation.

== Viscounts Claneboye (1622) ==
- James Hamilton, 1st Viscount Claneboye (died 1644)
- James Hamilton, 2nd Viscount Claneboye (created Earl of Clanbrassil in 1647)

== Earls of Clanbrassil; First creation (1647) ==
- James Hamilton, 1st Earl of Clanbrassil (died 1659)
  - James Hamilton, Viscount Claneboye (1642–1658)
- Henry Hamilton, 2nd Earl of Clanbrassil (1647–1675)

== Earls of Clanbrassil; Second creation (1756) ==
- James Hamilton, 1st Earl of Clanbrassil (died 1758)
- James Hamilton, 2nd Earl of Clanbrassil (1730–1798)

== See also ==
- Baron Dufferin and Claneboye
- Earl of Roden
