= Baron Dufferin and Claneboye =

Title in the Peerage of Ireland

Barony of Dufferin and Claneboye
- Azure a fess or in chief a crescent argent between two mullets of the second and in base a mascle of the third
- Creation date: 30 July 1800
- Created by: George III
- Peerage: Peerage of Ireland
- First holder: Dorcas Blackwood, Lady Blackwood
- Present holder: John Blackwood, 11th Baron Dufferin and Claneboye
- Heir apparent: Hon. Francis Blackwood
- Remainder to: Heirs male of the 1st baroness's body by her late husband, Sir James Blackwood
- Status: Extant
- Former seat: Clandeboye Estate
- Motto: Per vias rectas ("By straight ways")

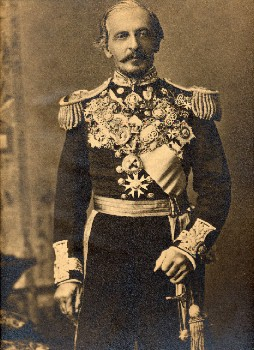
Frederick Hamilton-Temple-Blackwood, 1st Marquess of Dufferin and Ava

Baron Dufferin and Claneboye, (Note: Although the place in Ulster in the north of Ireland is written Clandeboye, and so are the UK titles granted in 1850 and 1871, the Irish title granted in 1800 is Baron Dufferin and Claneboye with no 'd'. Both derive from the Gaelic Clann Aodha Buidhe; over the centuries the spelling has varied.) of Ballyleidy and Killyleagh in County Down, Northern Ireland, is a title in the Peerage of Ireland. It was created on 30 July 1800 for Dame Dorcas Blackwood, widow of Sir John Blackwood, 2nd Baronet, Member of the Irish Parliament for Killyleagh and Bangor, in return for support for the Union of Ireland and the United Kingdom.

== History ==
The peerage had been intended for Sir John in return for his support for the Union with the Kingdom of Great Britain. The Blackwood baronetcy, of Killyleagh in the County of Down, was created in the Baronetage of Ireland in 1763 for Robert Blackwood, the father of Sir John Blackwood. He was the son of John Blackwood and Ursula Hamilton, the daughter and co-heir of Robert Hamilton of Killyleagh, County Down. The Blackwood family, originally of Scottish descent, were prominent landowners in County Down and controlled the borough constituency of Killyleagh in the Irish Parliament. Lady Dufferin and Claneboye was the daughter of James Stevenson, son of Colonel Hans Stevenson and Anne Hamilton, daughter of James Hamilton, son of Archibald Hamilton, of Halcraig, Lanarkshire, brother of James Hamilton, 1st Viscount Claneboye. Her great-grandfather James Hamilton had become the sole heir of Lord Claneboye when the first Viscount's grandson, Henry Hamilton, 2nd Earl of Clanbrassil and 3rd Viscount Claneboye, died in 1675.

Lady Dufferin and Claneboye was succeeded by her son, the second Baron, who had already succeeded his father as third Baronet. He represented Killyleagh in the Irish House of Commons and Helston and Aldeburgh in the British House of Commons and was also an Irish representative peer from 1820 to 1836. He was childless and was succeeded by his younger brother, the third Baron. The latter's grandson, the fifth Baron, was a prominent Liberal politician, diplomat and colonial administrator, and notably served as Governor General of Canada and Viceroy of India. In 1850, at the age of 23, he was created Baron Clandeboye, of Clandeboye in the County of Down, in the Peerage of the United Kingdom, which gave him a seat in the House of Lords. In 1871 he was created Viscount Clandeboye, of Clandeboye in the County of Down, and Earl of Dufferin, in the County of Down, and in 1888 he was even further honoured when he was made Earl of Ava, in the Province of Burma, and Marquess of Dufferin and Ava, in the County of Down and in the Province of Burma. These titles were also in the Peerage of the United Kingdom. Lord Dufferin and Ava also assumed by royal licence the additional surname of Hamilton in 1862 and that of Temple (which was the maiden name of his father's mother) in 1872.

His eldest son and heir apparent Archibald Hamilton-Temple-Blackwood, Earl of Ava, was killed at the Siege of Ladysmith during the Second Boer War while serving as a war correspondent. He was unmarried and the Marquess was therefore succeeded by the second son, the second Marquess. On his death, the titles passed to another brother, the third Marquess. He was a soldier and also served as Speaker of the Senate of Northern Ireland. Lord Dufferin and Ava died in an air crash and he was succeeded by his son, the fourth Marquess. He notably held office as Under-Secretary of State for the Colonies in the government of Neville Chamberlain.

After his death in the Second World War, the titles were inherited by his six-year-old son, the fifth Marquess, later a well-known patron of arts. He was childless and on his death in 1988 the marquessate, earldoms, viscountcy and barony of Clandeboye (created in 1850) became extinct. His widow, Lindy, Marchioness of Dufferin and Ava lived at the Clandeboye Estate until her death on 26 October 2020.

The last Marquess was succeeded in the baronetcy and barony of Dufferin and Claneboye by his distant relative Sir Francis George Blackwood, 7th Baronet, of the Navy (see Blackwood baronets of the Navy (1814)), who became the tenth Baron. Since 1991, the titles have been held by the latter's son, the eleventh Baron. Like his father he lives in Australia.

== Holders ==
=== Blackwood baronets, of Killyleagh (1763) ===
- Sir Robert Blackwood, 1st Baronet (1694–1774)
- Sir John Blackwood, 2nd Baronet (died 1799)
- Sir James Stevenson Blackwood, 3rd Baronet (1755–1836) (succeeded as Baron Dufferin and Claneboye in 1807)

=== Baron Dufferin and Claneboye (1800) ===
- Dorcas Blackwood, 1st Baroness Dufferin and Claneboye (1726–1807)
- James Stevenson Blackwood, 2nd Baron Dufferin and Claneboye (1755–1836)
- Hans Blackwood, 3rd Baron Dufferin and Claneboye (1758–1839)
- Price Blackwood, 4th Baron Dufferin and Claneboye (1794–1841)
- Frederick Temple Hamilton-Temple-Blackwood, 5th Baron Dufferin and Claneboye (1826–1902) (created Earl of Dufferin in 1871)

=== Earl of Dufferin (1871) ===
- Frederick Temple Hamilton-Temple-Blackwood, 1st Earl of Dufferin (1826–1902) (created Marquess of Dufferin and Ava in 1888)

=== Marquess of Dufferin and Ava (1888) ===
- Frederick Temple Hamilton-Temple-Blackwood, 1st Marquess of Dufferin and Ava (1826–1902)
- Terence John Temple Hamilton-Temple-Blackwood, 2nd Marquess of Dufferin and Ava (1866–1918)
- Frederick Temple Hamilton-Temple-Blackwood, 3rd Marquess of Dufferin and Ava (1875–1930)
- Basil Sheridan Hamilton-Temple-Blackwood, 4th Marquess of Dufferin and Ava (1909–1945)
- Sheridan Frederick Terence Hamilton-Temple-Blackwood, 5th Marquess of Dufferin and Ava (1938–1988)

=== Baron Dufferin and Claneboye (1800; reverted) ===
- Francis George Blackwood, 10th Baron Dufferin and Claneboye (1916–1991)
- John Francis Blackwood, 11th Baron Dufferin and Claneboye (b. 1944)

The heir apparent is the present holder's son, the Hon. Francis Senden Blackwood (b. 1979)

== Family tree ==
Blackwood family tree: Marquesses of Dufferin and Ava, Barons Dufferin and Claneboye
and Blackwood baronets

Sir Robert Blackwood; 1st Baronet, of Killyleagh; 1694–1774
Sir John Blackwood; 2nd Baronet, of Killyleagh died 1799	Dorcas Blackwood (née Stevenson); Created 1800; 1st Baroness Dufferin and Claneboye; 1726–1807
James Stevenson Blackwood; 3rd Baronet; Later; 2nd Baron Dufferin and Claneboye; 1755–1836	John Blackwood; 1757–1833	Hans Blackwood; 3rd Baron Dufferin and Claneboye; 1758–1839	Price Blackwood; 1760–1816	Sir Henry Blackwood; 1st Baronet, of the Navy; 1770–1832
Captain; Robert Temple Blackwood; 1788–1815; Killed at the Battle of Waterloo	Price Blackwood; 4th Baron Dufferin and Claneboye; 1794–1841	Sir Henry Martin Blackwood; 2nd Baronet, of the Navy; 1801–1851
Frederick Hamilton-Temple-Blackwood; 5th Baron Baron Dufferin and Claneboye; Created; 1st Marquess of Dufferin and Ava; 1826–1901	Sir Henry Blackwood; 3rd Baronet, of the Navy; 1828–1854	Sir Francis Blackwood; 4th Baronet, of the Navy; 1838–1924
Archibald James Hamilton-Temple-Blackwood; Styled; Earl of Ava; 1863–1900; Killed in action, Boer War at Ladysmith, South Africa	Terence John Hamilton-Temple-Blackwood; 2nd Marquess of Dufferin and Ava; 1866–1918	Lord; Ian Basil Hamilton-Temple-Blackwood; 1870–1917; Killed in action, World War I	Frederick Hamilton-Temple-Blackwood; 3rd Marquess of Dufferin and Ava; 1875–1930	Henry Robert Temple Blackwood; 1862–1910	Francis Edward Blackwood; 1874–1906; Killed in action, Nigeria	Maurice Baldwin Raymond Blackwood; 1882–1941; Died on active duty, WWII
Basil Sheridan Hamilton-Temple-Blackwood; 4th Marquess of Dufferin and Ava; 1909–1945; Killed in action, WWII at Burma	Sir Henry Robert Temple Blackwood; 5th Baronet, of the Navy; 1896–1946	Sir Francis Elliot Temple Blackwood; 6th Baronet, of the Navy; 1901–1979	Francis George Blackwood; 7th Baronet, of the Navy; Later; 10th Baron Dufferin and Claneboye (reverted); 1916–1991
Sheridan Frederick Terence Hamilton-Temple-Blackwood; 5th Marquess of Dufferin and Ava; 1938–1988; All titles except the barony of Dufferin and Claneboye extinct	John Francis Blackwood; 11th Baron Dufferin and Claneboye; Born 1944
Hon. Francis Senden Blackwood; Born 1979; Heir apparent

== See also ==
- Dufferin (barony)
- Earl of Clanbrassil
