= Grey baronets of Fallodon (1814) =

Grey baronets
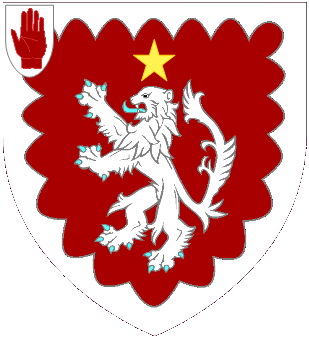
- Motto: De Bon Vouloir Servir Le Roy (To Serve The King With Good Will)
- Arms: Gules a lion rampant within a bordure engrailed Argent a mullet for difference. (Note: For additional information about the arms, see Heaton Castle#The Grey family.)
- Crest: A scaling ladder in bend sinister Or hooked and pointed Sable.

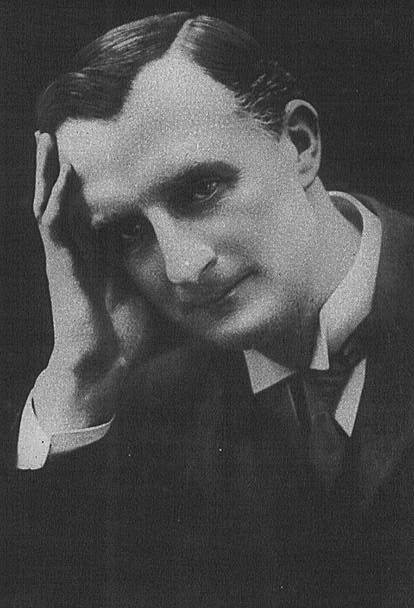
Sir Edward Grey, 3rd Baronet of Fallodon

The Grey baronetcy of Fallodon in the County of Northumberland was created in the Baronetage of the United Kingdom on 29 July 1814 for the Hon. George Grey, Captain R.N., 1767–1828, Commissioner of Portsmouth Dockyard. He was the third son of the 1st Earl Grey. His son, the 2nd Baronet, and great-grandson, the 3rd Baronet, were both prominent Liberal politicians. The latter was raised to the Peerage of the United Kingdom as Viscount Grey of Fallodon, in the County of Northumberland, in 1916; this title became extinct on his death in 1933.

== Grey baronets, of Fallodon (1814) ==
- Sir George Grey, 1st Baronet (1767–1828)
- Sir George Grey, 2nd Baronet (1799–1882)
  - George Henry Grey (1835–1874)
- Sir Edward Grey, 3rd Baronet (1862–1933))

=== Viscounts Grey of Fallodon (1916) ===
- Edward Grey, 1st Viscount Grey of Fallodon (1862–1933)

=== Grey baronets, of Fallodon (1814; reverted) ===
- Sir Charles George Grey, 4th Baronet (1880–1957); he died sine prole, and the title passed to his brother
- Sir Harry Martin Grey, 5th Baronet (1882–1960); he died sine prole, the title passed to his cousin
- Sir Robin Edward Dysart Grey, 6th Baronet (1886–1974); had issue and was succeeded by his eldest grandson
- Sir Anthony Dysart Grey, 7th Baronet (born 1949)

The heir is the present holder's son, Thomas Jasper Grey (born 1998).

== Notes ==
Baronetage of the United Kingdom
Preceded by Domville baronets	Grey baronets of Fallodon; 29 July 1814	Succeeded by Blackwood baronets
