= James Hamilton, 1st Viscount Claneboye =

Scottish politician (1560–1644)

Member of the Ireland Parliament for County Down
- In office 1613–1634
- Preceded by: Nicholas Bagenal
- Succeeded by: Hugh Montgomery, 2nd Viscount Montgomery

Personal details
- Born: c. 1560 Dunlop, East Ayrshire
- Died: 24 January 1644 Bangor, County Down
- Spouses: Alice Penicook; Ursula Brabazon; Jane Phillips
- Children: James Hamilton, 1st Earl of Clanbrassil
- Education: University of St Andrews

James Hamilton, 1st Viscount Claneboye (c. 1560 – 24 January 1644) was a Scot who became owner of large tracts of land in County Down, Ireland, and founded a successful Protestant Scots settlement there several years before the Plantation of Ulster. Hamilton was able to acquire the lands as a result of his connections with King James I, for whom he had been an agent in negotiations for James to succeed Queen Elizabeth I.

== Early life and academic career ==
Hamilton was the eldest of six sons of Hans Hamilton (1535/6–1608) and Jonet (or Janet), daughter of James Denham, laird of West Shield, Ayrshire. His father Hans was the first Protestant minister of Dunlop in East Ayrshire, Scotland.

He was probably the James Hamilton who studied at the University of St Andrews and received a BA in 1584 and an MA in 1585. He acquired a reputation as "one of the greatest scholars and hopeful wits in his time" and became a teacher in Glasgow.

In about 1587 he left Scotland by ship and due to storms unexpectedly arrived in Dublin, Ireland. He decided to stay and took up the position of master at the Free School in Ship Street. He employed fellow Scot James Fullerton as usher. One of their pupils was eight-year-old James Ussher, later Archbishop of Armagh. When Trinity College Dublin was founded in 1592, the first provost Adam Loftus noted that Hamilton had "a noble spirit ... and learned head" and he and Fullerton became the first two Fellows of the college. Young Ussher followed them to Trinity. Hamilton and Fullerton were presbyterians, unlike Loftus who was episcopalian. Hamilton became bursar of Trinity in 1598.

== Agent for King James VI of Scotland ==
Hamilton and Fullerton were also agents and informants for King James VI of Scotland. They provided James with information about Queen Elizabeth I of England's activities in Ireland and sought Irish support for James's succession to the English throne on Elizabeth's death. Eventually they resigned their College positions to take up appointments at the royal court. Hamilton was in London intermittently from August 1600 as agent for James VI in connection with negotiations for James to succeed Elizabeth.

Hamilton was accredited by James VI to reside in London, by his letters to Elizabeth and Robert Cecil on 4 August 1600. James said that Hamilton would be a "remaining agent" the equivalent of George Nicolson in Edinburgh.

He eventually carried the official news of Elizabeth's death to Scotland.

== Settlement in County Down ==
In 1601, Gaelic chieftain Conn O'Neill of Ulster sent his men to attack English soldiers after a quarrel and was consequently imprisoned. O'Neill's wife made a deal with Scots aristocrat Hugh Montgomery to give him half of O'Neill's lands if Montgomery could get a royal pardon for O'Neill. Montgomery obtained the pardon but in August 1604 Hamilton discovered the plan for the land. James Fullerton, now Sir James and an advisor to King James, convinced the king that the lands were too large to be split in two and should be divided into three, with one-third going to his associate Hamilton; the king agreed. Hamilton's main grant, made formally in November 1605, was the lordship of Upper (South) Clandeboye and the Great Ardes in County Down.

The Nine Years' War in Ireland had ended in 1603, and Hamilton and Montgomery both recruited tenants from the Scottish Lowlands to migrate to Ulster to farm their newly acquired lands for low rents. They persuaded members of their extended families to come and, in May 1606, the first group of farmers, artisans, merchants and chaplains arrived to form the Ulster Scots settlement, four years before the Plantation of Ulster in 1610. The settlement was a success and Hamilton was knighted by the king at Royston on 14 November 1609. In 1610 Hamilton bought Dufferin from the White family. By 1611, a new town of eighty houses had been established at Bangor, where Hamilton lived. His brother John acquired lands in County Armagh and founded Markethill, Hamiltonsbawn and Newtownhamilton.

Hamilton was elected a member of parliament for County Down in 1613. He repaired the Bangor Abbey church in 1617. He was made the first Viscount Claneboye on 4 May 1622, in the Peerage of Ireland. He was also a privy councillor. In about 1625 he moved from Bangor to Killyleagh Castle. Montgomery died in 1636 and in 1637 Hamilton built the Custom House and Tower House at his port of Bangor, to try to replace Montgomery's port at Donaghadee as Ulster's main port.

In 1641, when in his eighties, he returned to his Scottish home town of Dunlop and built a mausoleum for his parents in the churchyard where his father had been minister. He erected a school attached to the mausoleum which he named Clandeboye School. Both buildings still stand.

In the Irish Rebellion of 1641, the native Irish population rose against English settlers, and later also Scottish settlers, and killed thousands of them. The king gave colonels' commissions to Hamilton and other Scots in November to raise troops in Ulster to combat the rising. Hamilton raised a regiment of 1,000 men. He wrote for red and white taffeta to make flags for his captains. The regiments raised by Hamilton and Hugh Montgomery's son, Hugh Montgomery, 2nd Viscount Montgomery, saved their areas of County Down from the degree of damage done in other parts of Ulster.

Hamilton died, aged about eighty-four, on 24 January 1644 and was buried in the church at Bangor.

== Family and succession ==
Hamilton's first wife was Alice Penicook (sometimes referred to, apparently incorrectly, as Penelope Cooke), and she was with him until at least 1602. His second wife was Ursula Brabazon (died 1625), sixth daughter of Edward Brabazon, 1st Baron Ardee and Mary Smythe, and sister of the 1st Earl of Meath. He divorced Ursula in about 1615 to marry Jane Phillips (died 1661), the mother of his son. She was the daughter of Sir John Phillips of Picton Castle, Pembrokeshire.

Hamilton was succeeded as Viscount Claneboye by his only son James, who was also created Earl of Clanbrassil in 1647. His grandson, Henry Hamilton, 3rd Viscount Claneboye, died in 1675 with no sons and the title became extinct. The name Claneboye was revived in a title in 1800 when his great-great-grandniece Dorcas Blackwood was made 1st Baroness Dufferin and Claneboye.

== See also ==
- Killyleagh Castle for more on his successors
- John Livingstone

== References and notes ==
Peerage of Ireland
New creation	Viscount Claneboye; 1st creation 1622–1644	Succeeded by James Hamilton
