= Delamont Country Park =

Park in Strangford Lough, Northern Ireland

Coordinates: 54.382°N 5.672°W

Delamont Country Park is located on the shores of Strangford Lough in County Down, Northern Ireland. It covers an area of approximately 200 acres 2 km south of Killyleagh. It is currently maintained by Newry, Mourne and Down District Council having previously been under the control of Down District Council.

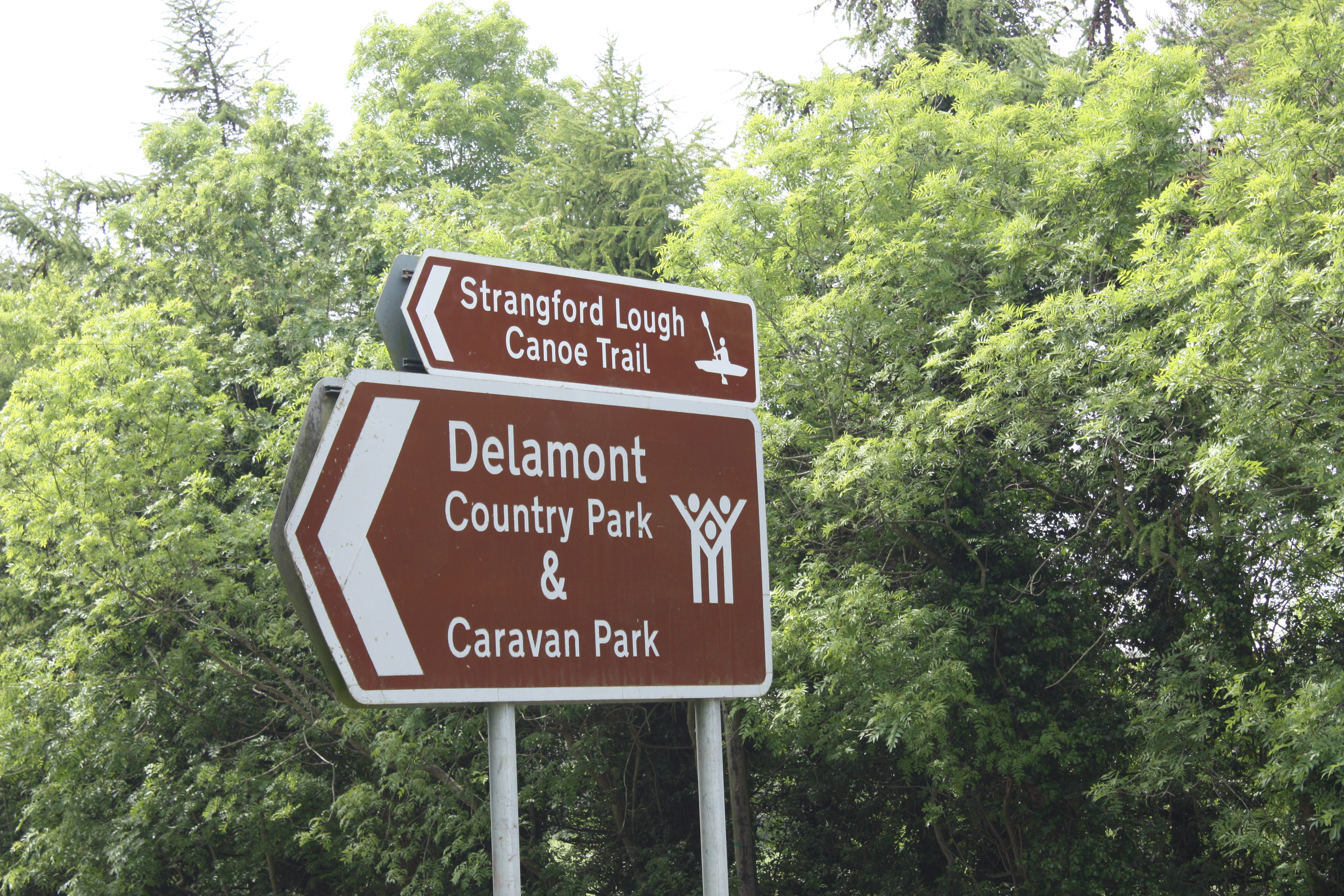
Delamont Country Park, June 2012 (01)

== Points of interest ==
In addition to a visitor centre with office, shop and information point the park contains a caravan park and campsite managed by Newry, Mourne and Down District Council There is also a seasonal miniature railway with a 1 km track and at the highest point stands the Strangford Stone (Millennium Stone), the tallest megalith in Ireland which was erected in 1999 using the power of 1000 volunteers. However, it was broken in two when erected. There is also a heronry within the park.

== Events ==
The park is licensed for the performance of civil partnership and marriage ceremonies.

In July 2016 the world community coastal rowing championships "Skiffie Worlds 2016" was held over a 2 km course on Strangford Lough at Delamont. Strangford Lough Watersports Festival: SkiffieFest https://www.visitmournegullionstrangford.com/whats-on/strangford-lough-watersports-festival-skiffiefest-p793941
