= Dunbar baronets of Boath (1814) =

Extinct baronetcy

Escutcheon of the Dunbar baronets of Boath

The Dunbar baronetcy of Boath, Nairn was created on 19 September 1814 in the Baronetage of the United Kingdom for the naval captain Sir James Dunbar, knighted in 1809.

== Dunbar baronets of Boath (1814) ==
- Sir James Dunbar, 1st Baronet (1770–1836)
- Sir Frederic William Dunbar, 2nd Baronet (1819–1851)
- Sir James Alexander Dunbar, 3rd Baronet (1821–1883)
- Sir Alexander James Dunbar, 4th Baronet (1870–1900)
- Sir Frederick George Dunbar, 5th Baronet (1875–1937). He left no heir, and the baronetcy became extinct on his death.

== Notes ==
Baronetage of the United Kingdom
Preceded by Blackwood baronets	Dunbar baronets of Boath; 19 September 1814	Succeeded by Collier baronets
