= Robert Blackwood (Irish MP) =

Anglo-Irish politician

Robert Blackwood (April 1752 – 31 January 1785), was an Anglo-Irish politician.

Blackwood was the eldest son of Sir John Blackwood, 2nd Baronet, and Dorcas Stevenson, later Baroness Dufferin and Claneboye. He was returned to the Irish Parliament for Killyleagh in 1776, a seat he held until his death nine years later. He died in Belfast in January 1785, after a fall from his horse. He never married and his younger brother James eventually succeeded their father in the baronetcy and their mother in the barony.

Parliament of Ireland
Preceded by Arthur Johnston; Pierce Butler	Member of Parliament for Killyleagh; 1776–1786; With: Sir John Blackwood, Bt	Succeeded by Sir John Blackwood, Bt; James Blackwood
