= James Blackwood, 2nd Baron Dufferin and Claneboye =

Anglo-Irish peer and politician

James Stevenson Blackwood, 2nd Baron Dufferin and Claneboye MP ADC (8 July 1755 – 8 August 1836), styled as Sir James Blackwood, 3rd Baronet, from 1799 to 1807, was an Anglo-Irish peer and politician.

== Early life and family ==
Blackwood was born in 1755, the second son of Sir John Blackwood, 2nd Baronet and Dorcas Stevenson, daughter and co-heiress of James Stevenson. His mother was quite wealthy as her father eventually became the sole heir to estates held by James Hamilton, 1st Earl of Clanbrassil, whose male line had died out with his son. In 1799, James' father died, leaving him to inherit the baronetcy as his elder brother, Robert Blackwood, had been killed in 1785 in a fall from his horse. Although commonly referred to as Anglo-Irish, the Blackwoods are a Scottish family.

In 1800, his mother was created Baroness Dufferin and Claneboye of Ballyleidy and Killyeagh in the Peerage of Ireland, with remainder to her heirs male. After her death in 1807, he succeeded her as the 2nd Baron Dufferin and Claneboye.

== Career ==
Blackwood was a Member of the Parliament of Ireland for Killyleagh in County Down from 1788 until the Irish Parliament was abolished with the Act of Union in 1801. In compensation for his seat being disenfranchised, he received £15,000 from the crown (equivalent to £1,029,000 in 2025).

He was later elected to the British House of Commons, serving as member of parliament for the Cornish constituency of Helston from 1807 to 1812, and for Aldeburgh in Suffolk from 1812 to 1818. He then sat in the House of Lords as an Irish representative peer from 1820 to 1836.

He was High Sheriff of Down for 1804 and governor of County Down 1830–36. He served as aide-de-camp to King William IV.

In 1794, he raised the 33rd Light Dragoons (also known as Ulster Regiment of Light Dragoons). He was also colonel of the North Downshire Militia.

== Marriage and death ==
On 15 November 1801, Blackwood married Anne Dorothea, the only daughter of John Foster, 1st Baron Oriel and his wife, Margaretta Foster, 1st Viscountess Ferrard. They had no children.

After a period of illness, Lord Dufferin died on 8 August 1836 at his home, Ballyleidy, age 81. He had been under treatment by Sir Henry Halford in London and then spent a week at the home of his brother-in-law, Thomas Skeffington, 2nd Viscount Ferrard, in County Louth. He died two days after returning home. He was succeeded in the titles by his younger brother Hans. Lady Blackwood died on 28 March 1865 aged 93.

== Arms ==
Coat of arms of James Blackwood, 2nd Baron Dufferin and Claneboye

Coronet
A Coronet of an Baron
Crest
1st: On a Cap of Maintenance Gules tuned up Ermine a Crescent Argent
Escutcheon
Quarterly: 1st and 4th, Argent a saltire sable; on a chief of the second three holly leaves of the first (for Blackwood); 2nd, Azure, a fleur-de-lis between two mullets in fess or; in chief two roses, and in base three arrows palewise, points downwards, all argent (for Stevenson) 3rd: Gules, three cinqueoils ermine, and on a chief or, a lion passant guardant gules (for Hamilton)
Supporters
Dexter: a Lion Gules gorged with a Tressure flory counterflory Or; Sinister: an Heraldic Tiger Ermine gorged with a like Tressure Gules
Motto
Per vias rectas ("By straight ways")

Parliament of Ireland
Preceded by Sir John Blackwood, 2nd Bt; Robert Blackwood	Member of Parliament for Killyleagh; 1788–1801; With: Sir John Blackwood, 2nd Bt 1788–1790, 1798–1799; Hon. Robert Ward 1790–1798; Hans Blackwood 1799–1800; Daniel Mussenden 1800–1801	Succeeded by Parliament of the United Kingdom
Parliament of the United Kingdom
Preceded by John St Aubyn; Richard Richards	Member of Parliament for Helston; 1807–1812; With: John St Aubyn	Succeeded by William Horne; Hugh Hammersley
Preceded by Sir John Aubrey, Bt; Sandford Graham	Member of Parliament for Aldeburgh; 1812–1818; With: Andrew Strahan	Succeeded by Samuel Walker; Joshua Walker
Political offices
Preceded by The Earl of Roden	Representative peer for Ireland; 1820–1836	Succeeded by The Viscount Hawarden
Peerage of Ireland
Preceded by Dorcas Blackwood	Baron Dufferin and Claneboye; 1807–1836	Succeeded by Hans Blackwood
Baronetage of Ireland
Preceded by John Blackwood	Baronet (of Killyleagh); 1799–1836	Succeeded by Hans Blackwood
