= Henry Blackwood =

Anglo-Irish admiral (1770–1832)

Vice-Admiral Sir Henry Blackwood Bt GCH KCB
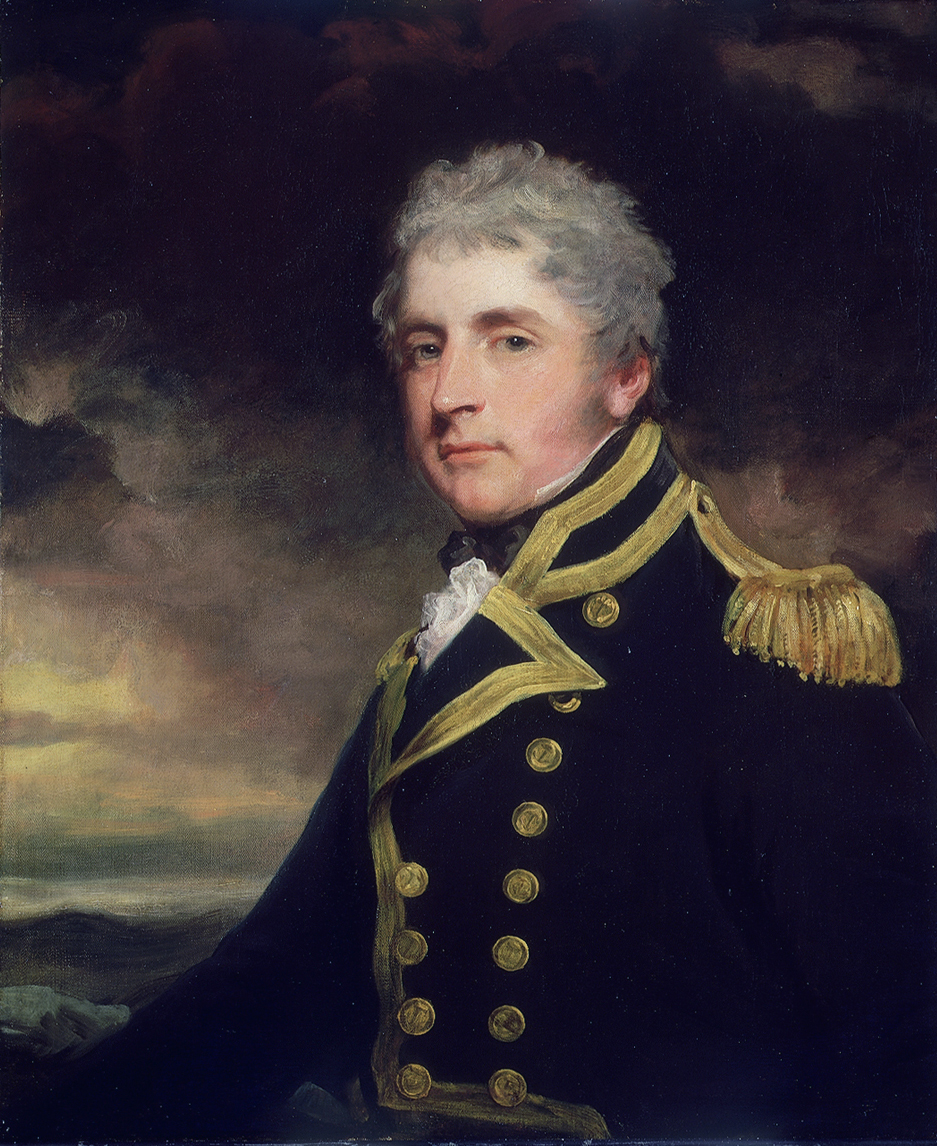
- Sir Henry Blackwood
- Born: 28 December 1770; Ballyleidy (later renamed Clandeboye), County Down
- Died: 13 December 1832 (aged 61); Ballyleidy (later renamed Clandeboye), County Down
- Military career
- Allegiance: United Kingdom
- Branch: Royal Navy
- Service years: 1781–1830
- Rank: Vice-Admiral
- Commands: HMS Nonsuch; HMS Brilliant; HMS Penelope; HMS Euryalus; Ajax; Warspite; East Indies Station; Nore Command
- Conflicts: Fourth Anglo-Dutch War; French Revolutionary Wars; Napoleonic Wars
- Awards: Knight Grand Cross of the Royal Guelphic Order; Knight Commander of the Order of the Bath

Vice-Admiral Sir Henry Blackwood, 1st Baronet, GCH, KCB (28 December 1770 – 13 December 1832), whose burial site and memorial are in Killyleagh Parish Church, was an Irish officer of the British Royal Navy.

== Early life ==
Blackwood was the fourth son of Sir John Blackwood, 2nd Baronet, of Ballyleidy (later renamed Clandeboye), County Down, and of Dorcas Blackwood, 1st Baroness Dufferin and Claneboye. In April 1781 he entered the Royal Navy as a volunteer on board the frigate HMS Artois, with Captain John MacBride, and in her was present at the Battle on the Dogger Bank.

== With the frigates ==
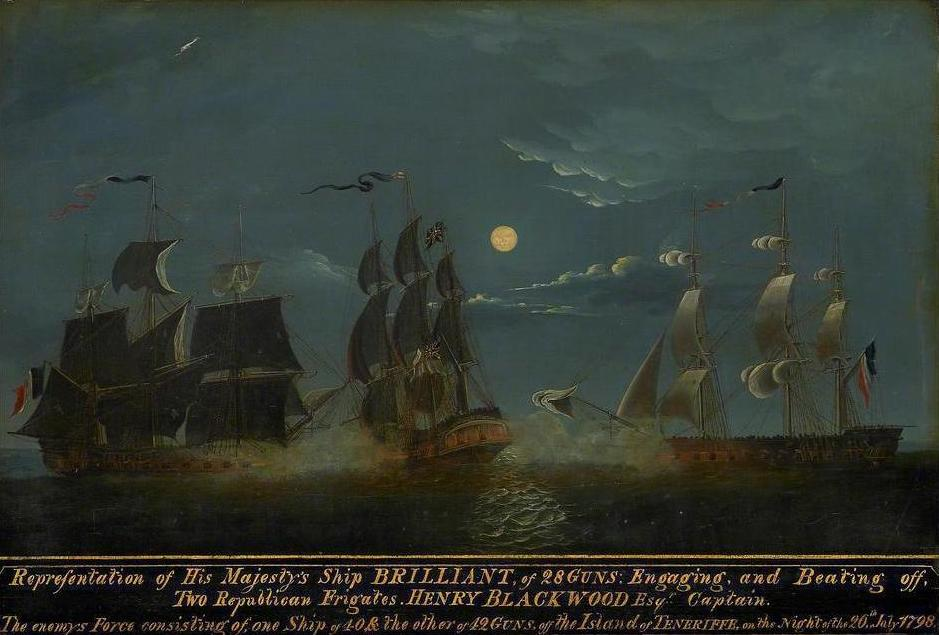
His Majesty's Ship Brilliant, of 28 guns: Engaging and Beating off Two Republican Frigates

He was promoted lieutenant, commander, and to the rank of post captain. From August 1795 to April 1796 he was captain of the floating battery HMS Nonsuch in the Humber. He was then appointed to the frigate HMS Brilliant, of 28 guns. Early in 1798 Brilliant was sent out to join Admiral Waldegrave on the Newfoundland Station; and on 26 July, whilst standing close into the bay of Santa Cruz in quest of a French privateer, she observed the frigates Vertu and Régénérée preparing to sail for Rochefort. At 6, the French frigates put to sail and started firing on Brilliant; Régénérée was closing in to her opponent when Vertu, which had sailed large, touched the wind; Régénérée imitated her manoeuver, but lost her mizzen and bowsprit, allowing Brilliant to flee. Vertu gave chase, but could not overhaul her opponent and returned to Tenerife. There, Régénérée replaced her rigging, and both frigates eventually arrived in Rochefort on 5 September.

Early in 1799, Brilliant returned to England, and Blackwood was appointed to the frigate HMS Penelope, of 36 guns, in which, after a few months of Channel service, he was sent out to the Mediterranean, and employed during the winter and following spring in the close blockade of Malta.

On the night of 30 March 1800 Guillaume Tell, of 80 guns, taking advantage of a southerly gale and intense darkness, weighed and ran out of the harbour. Although this ship of the line vastly outclassed Penelope, Blackwood immediately followed, and, having the advantage of sailing, quickly came up with her; then, in the words of the log:

'luffed under her stern, and gave him the larboard port broadside, bore up under the larboard quarter and gave him the starboard broadside, receiving from him only his stern-chase guns. From this hour till daylight, finding that we could place ourselves on either quarter, the action continued in a foregoing manner, and with such success on our side that, when day broke, the Guillaume Tell was found in a most dismantled state.

At five o'clock Lion, of 64 guns, and some little time afterwards Foudroyant, of 80 guns, came up, and after a determined and gallant resistance Guillaume Tell surrendered; but that she was brought to action at all was entirely due to the audacious Penelope. Nelson wrote from Palermo (5 April 1800) to Blackwood himself: 'Is there a sympathy which ties men together in the bonds of friendship without having a personal knowledge of each other? If so (and I believe it was so to you), I was your friend and acquaintance before I saw you. Your conduct and character on the late glorious occasion stamps your fame beyond the reach of envy. It was like yourself; it was like the Penelope. Thanks; and say everything kind for me to your brave officers and men'.

== HMS Euryalus ==
In April 1803 Blackwood was appointed to Euryalus, of 36 guns. During the next two years he was employed on the coast of Ireland or in the Channel, and in July 1805 was sent to watch the movements of the allied fleet under Villeneuve after its defeat by Sir Robert Calder. On his return with the news that Villeneuve had gone to Cádiz, he stopped on his way to London to see Nelson, who went with him to the Admiralty, and received his final instructions to resume the command of the fleet without delay. Blackwood, in Euryalus, accompanied him to Cádiz, and was appointed to the command of the inshore squadron, with the duty of keeping the admiral informed of every movement of the enemy. He was offered a line-of-battle ship, but preferred to remain in Euryalus, believing that he would have more opportunity of distinction; for Villeneuve, he was convinced, would not venture out in the presence of Nelson. When he saw the combined fleets outside, Blackwood could not but regret his decision. On the morning of Trafalgar, 21 Oct., in writing to his wife, he added: 'My signal just made on board Victory – I hope to order me into a vacant line-of-battle ship.' This signal was made at six o'clock, and from that time till after noon, when the shots were already flying thickly over the Victory, Blackwood remained on board, receiving the admiral's last instructions, and, together with Captain Hardy, witnessing the disregarded codicil to the admiral's will. He was then ordered to return to his ship. 'God bless you, Blackwood,' said Nelson, shaking him by the hand; 'I shall never speak to you again.' 'He' (and it was Blackwood himself that wrote it) 'not only gave me the command of all the frigates, for the purpose of assisting disabled ships, but he also gave me a latitude seldom or ever given, that of making any use I pleased of his name in ordering any of the stern most line-of-battle ships to do what struck me as best'. Immediately after the battle Collingwood hoisted his flag on board the Euryalus, but after ten days removed it to Queen, and Euryalus was sent home with despatches and with the captured French admiral, Pierre-Charles de Villeneuve. Blackwood landed at Falmouth and was one of the first messengers to use the Trafalgar Way to deliver his dispatches to the Admiralty in London. He was thus in England at the time of Lord Nelson's funeral (8 January 1806), on which occasion he acted as train-bearer of the chief mourner, Sir Peter Parker, the aged admiral of the fleet.

== Loss of HMS Ajax ==
On 14 February 1807, while captain of Ajax in the Dardanelles under the command of Admiral Sir John Duckworth, his vessel accidentally caught fire, with the loss of 252 lives. This still counts as one of the greatest tragedies in British naval history. Blackwood survived by clutching an oar for an hour in the water before being rescued by Canopus.

== HMS Warspite ==
Following the obligatory court-martial hearing over the loss of Ajax, after being acquitted Blackwood was given command of Warspite, where one of his midshipmen was his nephew Price Blackwood, 4th Baron Dufferin and Claneboye. With this command he sailed in the North Sea and later with the Channel Fleet, receiving a small squadron command during the blockade of Toulon in 1810. He continued to serve in Warspite after her repairs in 1812, returning to the Channel Fleet, and serving at the blockades of Brest and Rochfort during a cruise that took Warspite to Vlissingen, Netherlands; Douarnenez, France; Basque Roads, France; and Cawsand, Cornwall.

One of his midshipmen, James Cheape, describes Blackwood as a disciplinarian who seemed to order lashings almost daily. Elsewhere Cheape describes the conflict between Blackwood and Lord Keith when in November 1813, Cheape says he wrote that Lord Melville ordered a line of battleships to the "Western Islands", and wanted Warspite to be among them. Lord Keith, however, advised Captain Blackwood, "that he could not possibly send him as he had orders to send another ship" and sent his friend Captain West's ship instead. Captain Blackwood then sent a "private letter to Lord Keith – saying he wished Warspite to have the preference before any other ship – when showed the letter to Lord Keith he would not read it – so I suppose they don't speak now." This caused Blackwood to resign his command immediately after a continuous active service of six years.

== Rear admiral ==
On 4 June 1814, Blackwood attained the rank of rear-admiral of the Blue and in September he was created a Baronet, for his conduct of the heads of royal families of Europe to England following the defeat of Napoleon. In August 1819 he was made a Knight Companion of the Order of the Bath, and appointed commander-in-chief of the East Indies Station, nearly suffering a shipwreck in Leander on his way there off the coast of Madeira. He returned from this station in December 1822. He became vice-admiral in May 1825, and from 1827 to 1830 he was Commander-in-Chief, The Nore. During this period, he lived at Blackwood House, 6 Cornwall Terrace, Regent's Park, London.

== Later life ==
From 1830 to his death he served as a Groom of the Bedchamber to King William IV.

He died after a short illness, differently stated as typhus or scarlet fever, on 13 December 1832, at Ballyleidy, the seat of his eldest brother, Lord Dufferin and Claneboye. He was interred in the family vault in the graveyard of the Church of Ireland parish church St John the Evangelist in Killyleagh, County Down. The church also houses a marble wall memorial and a stained-glass window to his memory. There is also a marble wall plaque at Westminster Abbey by William Behnes.

Blackwood was married three times and left a large family.

The Blackwood River, in Western Australia, is named in his honour; it was named by Captain (later Admiral Sir) James Stirling, who served under Blackwood as a youth from 1808 to 1810.

The region of Blackwood in Adelaide South Australia was named by William Light who served with him during the Napoleonic Wars

Military offices
Preceded by Sir Richard King	Commander-in-Chief, East Indies Station; 1820–1822	Succeeded by Charles Grant
Preceded by Sir Robert Moorsom	Commander-in-Chief, The Nore; 1827–1830	Succeeded by Sir John Beresford
Baronetage of the United Kingdom
New creation	Baronet (of the Navy); 1814–1832	Succeeded by Henry Martin Blackwood
