= Mehetabel (name) =

Mehetabel was the name of two minor biblical figures.

- The wife of Hadar (Genesis 36:39)
- A patriarch (Nehemiah 6:10)

The name in Hebrew means 'how good is God' or 'has done good to us'.

Mehetabel is also a given name. Notable individuals with the name include:

- Mehetabel Newman (1822–1908), New Zealand missionary and teacher
- Mehetabel Wesley Wright (1697–1750), English poet, the fourth daughter of Samuel Wesley (father of John and Charles Wesley).
- Mehitabel the fictional ally cat, friend of Archy the cockroach, in Don Marquis' tales of Archy and Mehitabel
