= Henry Hamilton, 2nd Earl of Clanbrassil =

Anglo-Irish peer (1647–1675)

The Right Honourable Henry Hamilton, 2nd Earl of Clanbrassil PC (Ire)
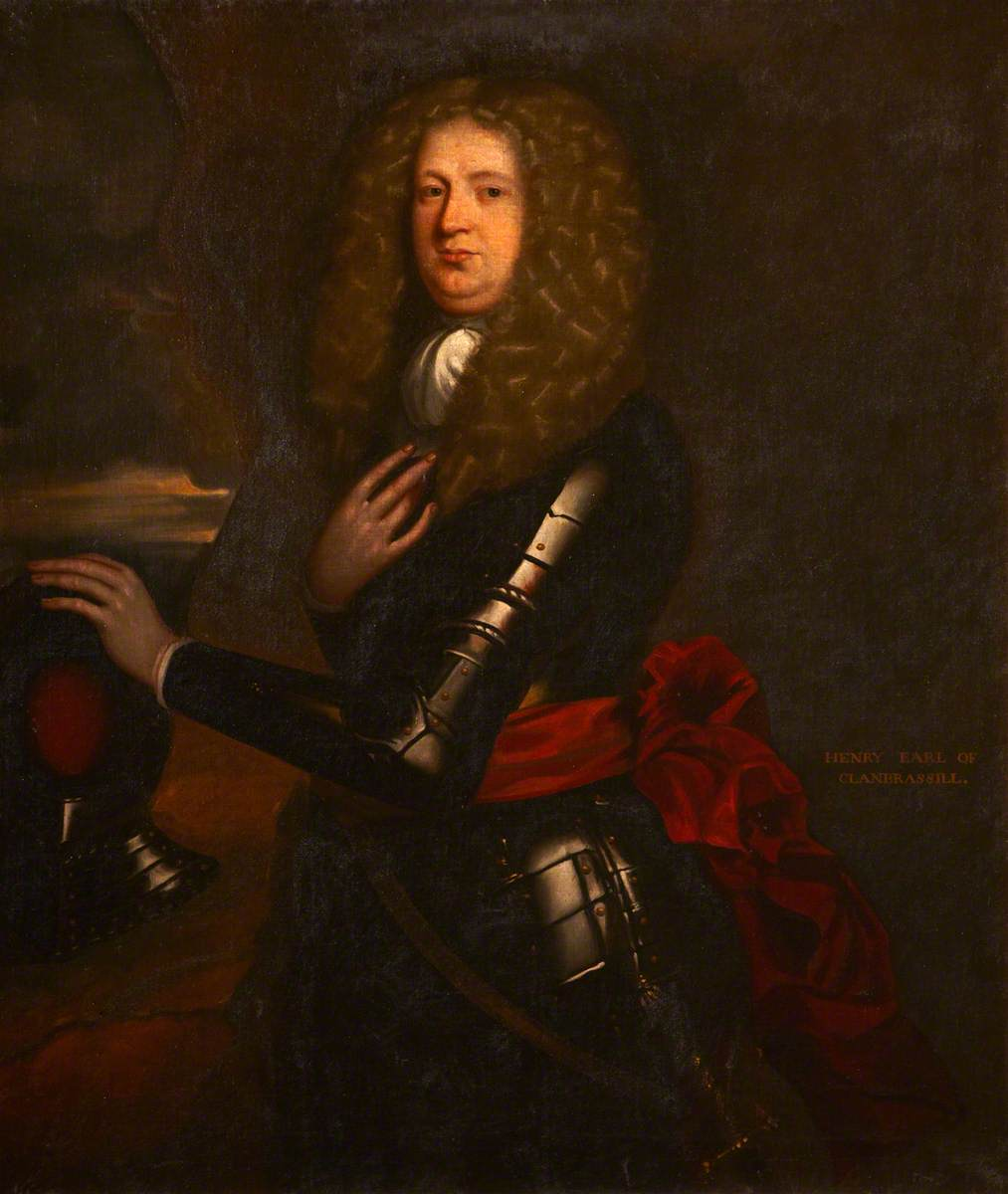
- Portrait attributed to Jacob Huysmans, c. 1665–1670
- Born: c. 1647
- Died: 12 January 1675; Dublin, Ireland
- Cause of death: Death by poison
- Burial place: Christ Church Cathedral, Dublin
- Spouse: Lady Alice Moore
- Children: James Hamilton (died 1670)

Henry Hamilton, 2nd Earl of Clanbrassil, PC (Ire) (c. 1647 – 12 January 1675) was an Anglo-Irish peer. His family alleged that he was murdered by his wife Lady Alice Moore so that she could inherit his estate.

== Biography ==
Lord Clanbrassil was the son of James Hamilton, 1st Earl of Clanbrassil and Lady Anne Carey. On 20 June 1659 he succeeded to his father's titles. He was educated at Christ Church, Oxford, graduating on 28 September 1663 with a Master of Arts. In 1666 he rebuilt the family seat of Killyleagh Castle, erecting the north tower and building a long fortified bawn in the front of the castle. Following a petition from Clanbrassil to Charles II of England for funds to help the restoration work, the King granted permission for the royal coat of arms to be placed above the door of the rebuilt castle.

In 1669 Clanbrassil was indicted for being present at the alleged rape of Sarah Maverill, but he was acquitted in August 1670. In February 1671 he was appointed to the Privy Council of Ireland having assumed his seat in the Irish House of Lords.

=== Marriage ===
In May 1667 Clanbrassil married Lady Alice Moore, daughter of Henry Moore, 1st Earl of Drogheda and Hon. Alice Spencer, daughter of William Spencer, 2nd Baron Spencer of Wormleighton. The marriage was contrary to the expectations of Clanbrassil's family. The couple lived an extravagant life between Killyleagh and Dublin. Their only child, James (born and died 1670) died in infancy and Clanbrassil's titles became extinct upon his death in 1675.

=== Death ===
In March 1674, Lady Clanbrassil is alleged to have convinced her husband to make a new will to ensure that Killyleagh passed to her, and not his cousins, upon his death. This ran contrary to the entail in the first earl's will and Clanbrassil's mother warned her son against signing a new will, writing to him that he would die within three months if he did so.

In January the following year, Clanbrassil died of suspected poisoning while in Dublin with Lady Clanbrassil. The evidence that Lady Clanbrassil carried out the poisoning is circumstantial and inconclusive. However, she had the body disembowelled and quickly buried in Christ Church Cathedral, Dublin, rather than in the family plot in Bangor, County Down. Lady Clanbrassil also had the new will, which she brought with her to Dublin, quickly proved by solicitors in the city without informing her dead husband's family. Legal action was subsequently mounted by Clanbrassil's cousins against Lady Clanbrassil in an attempt to restore the original will and recover the estate; the matter was settled in February 1679.

Peerage of Ireland
Preceded by James Hamilton	Earl of Clanbrassil; 1659–1675	Extinct
