= Price Blackwood, 4th Baron Dufferin and Claneboye =

Irish peer, Royal Navy chaplain

Price Blackwood, 4th Baron Dufferin and Claneboye (6 May 1794 – 21 July 1841) was the third and eldest surviving son of Hans Blackwood, 3rd Baron Dufferin and Claneboye and his first wife Mehetabel Hester Temple, daughter of Robert Temple.

He was a captain in the Royal Navy and married on 4 July 1825 Helen Selina Sheridan, daughter of Thomas Sheridan, himself the eldest son of the playwright and statesman Richard Brinsley Sheridan, and had issue:

- Frederick Temple Hamilton-Temple-Blackwood, 5th Baron Dufferin and Claneboye

Lord Dufferin died from an accidental overdose of morphine and was succeeded by his only son. Helen Lady Dufferin was married secondly after his death to George Hay, Earl of Gifford (1822–1862), the eldest son of George Hay, 8th Marquess of Tweeddale on 13 October 1862 on his deathbed. Lady Dufferin died on 13 June 1867.

== Arms ==
Coat of arms of Price Blackwood, 4th Baron Dufferin and Claneboye

Coronet
A Coronet of an Baron
Crest
1st: On a Cap of Maintenance Gules tuned up Ermine a Crescent Argent
Escutcheon
Azure a Fess Or in chief a Crescent Argent between two Mullets of the second and in base a Mascle of the third
Supporters
Dexter: a Lion Gules gorged with a Tressure flory counterflory Or; Sinister: an Heraldic Tiger Ermine gorged with a like Tressure Gules
Motto
Per Vias Rectas (By straight ways)

Peerage of Ireland
Preceded by Hans Blackwood	Baron Dufferin and Claneboye; 1839–1841	Succeeded by Frederick Temple Hamilton-Temple-Blackwood
