= James Hamilton, 1st Earl of Clanbrassil (first creation) =

Ulster-Scots Royalist peer, soldier and politician

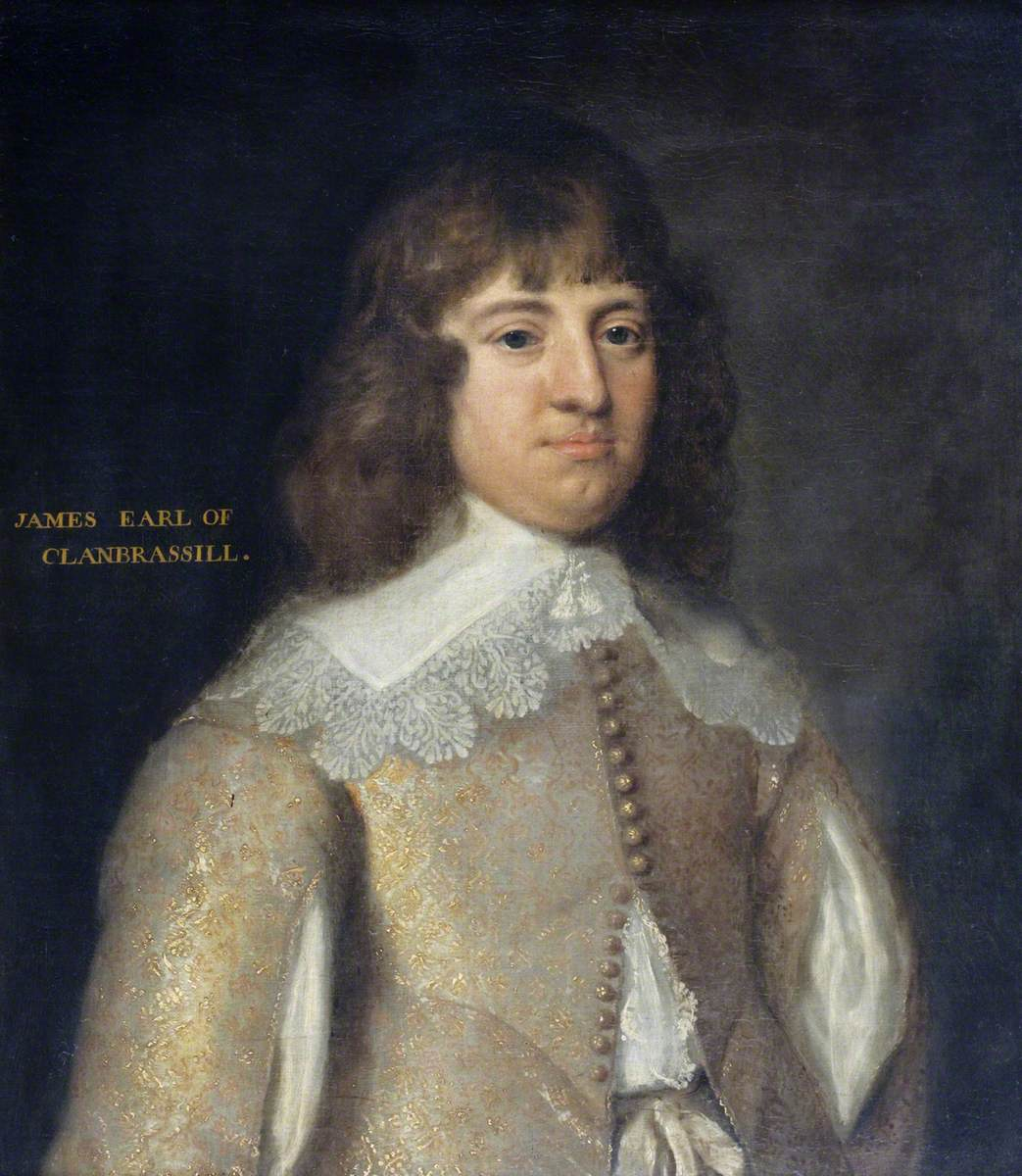
- The 1st Earl of Clanbrassil

Member of the Ireland Parliament for Down
- In office 1634–1635
- Preceded by: Hugh Montgomery, 1st Viscount Montgomery
- Succeeded by: James Montgomery

Personal details
- Born: c. 1618
- Died: 20 June 1659
- Spouse: Lady Anne Carey
- Children: James Hamilton, Viscount Claneboye; Henry Hamilton, 2nd Earl of Clanbrassill; Hans Hamilton; Lady Jane Hamilton
- Parent: James Hamilton, 1st Viscount Claneboye (father)

James Hamilton, 1st Earl of Clanbrassil (c.1618 – 20 June 1659), was an Ulster-Scots Royalist peer, soldier and politician.

== Early life ==
Lord Clanbrassil was the son of The 1st Viscount Claneboye and Jane Philips. His father had been an agent for James VI of Scotland and was granted a large amount of land in Ireland following James' accession to the English throne.

== Career ==
Clanbrassil sat in the Irish House of Commons as the Member of Parliament for County Down between 1634 and 1635. Upon the outbreak of the civil war in England, he raised a regiment of foot and a troop of horse in support of Charles I. The force was maintained for eight years at Clanbrassil's own expense. He succeeded to his father's viscountcy in 1644. Following the defeat of the king by the forces of Parliament, Clanbrassil's estates were seized by Oliver Cromwell.

On 7 June 1647, Charles I created him Earl of Clanbrassil in the Peerage of Ireland in recognition of his service. Clanbrassil was one of a number of Protestant Royalists who were allowed to return to their estates under The Protectorate, and did so in 1654 in return for a payment of £9,435. He was succeeded by his second son.

== Personal life ==
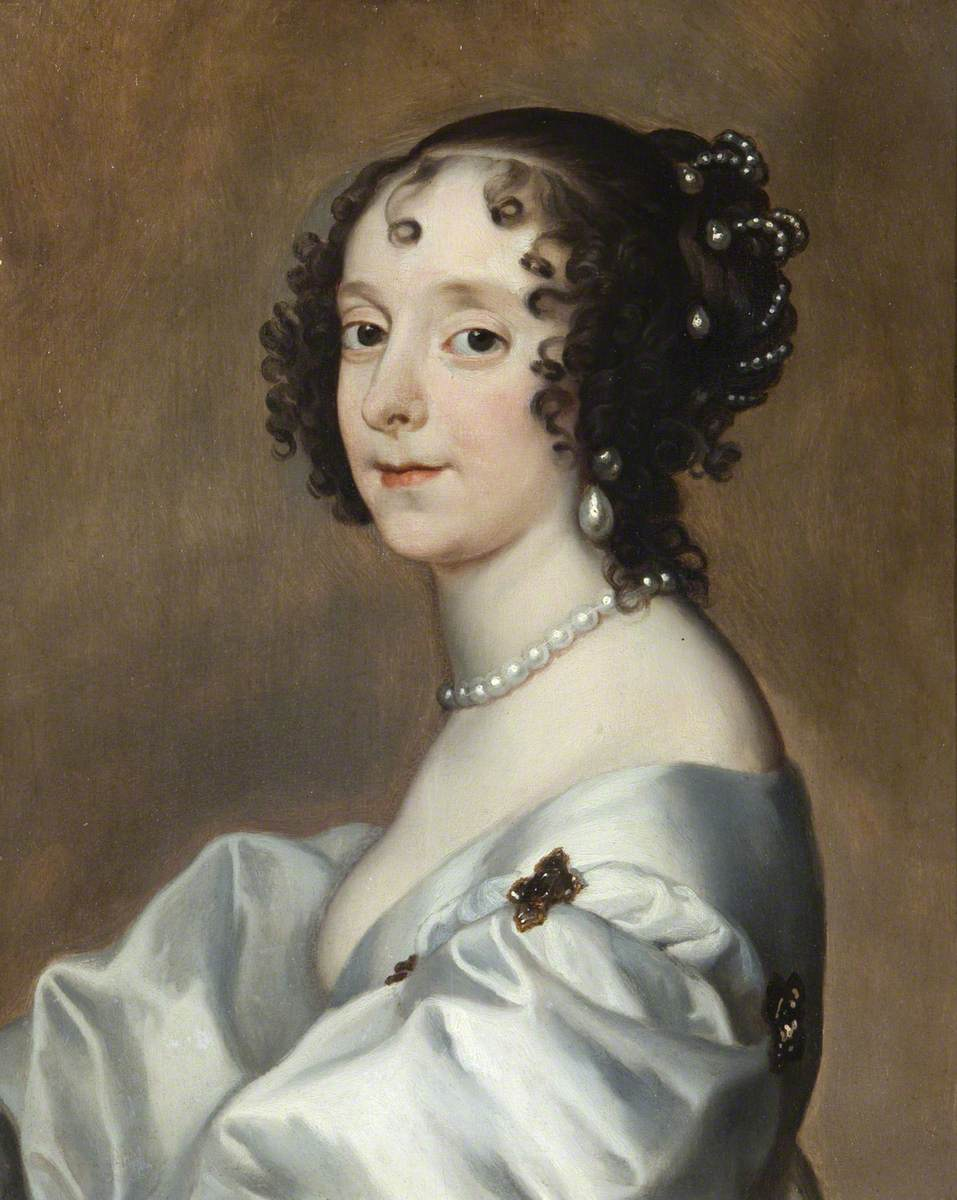
Portrait of an Unknown Lady, likely, Lady Anne, Countess of Clanbrassil, by Theodore Russel, c. 1640

In 1638 he was betrothed to Lady Mary Boyle, the 13-year-old daughter of the 1st Earl of Cork ('the Great Earl of Cork'). The marriage, however, never took place, as Mary, despite intense pressure from her formidable father, absolutely refused to marry him, on the unflattering ground that she found him physically repulsive. This defiance of a father's wishes, particularly in such a young girl, was almost unprecedented in the seventeenth century. Mary, however, was noted from an early age for her extraordinary strength of character. Even her father ruefully admitted that he was unable to control "my unruly daughter", and since he was genuinely fond of her he let the betrothal lapse.

On 23 September 1641, he married Lady Anne Carey. The couple had four children:

- Hon. James Hamilton, styled Viscount Claneboye (1642–1658)
- Henry Hamilton, 2nd Earl of Clanbrassil (1647–1675)
- Hon. Hans Hamilton
- Lady Jane Hamilton, who died unmarried

Lord Clanbrassil died on 20 June 1659 and was succeeded by his second son, Henry.

Peerage of Ireland
New creation	Earl of Clanbrassil; 1st creation 1647–1659	Succeeded by Henry Hamilton
Preceded by James Hamilton	Viscount Claneboye; 1st creation 1644–1659	Succeeded by Henry Hamilton
