= Dorcas Blackwood, 1st Baroness Dufferin and Claneboye =

The Right Honourable The Baroness Dufferin and Claneboye
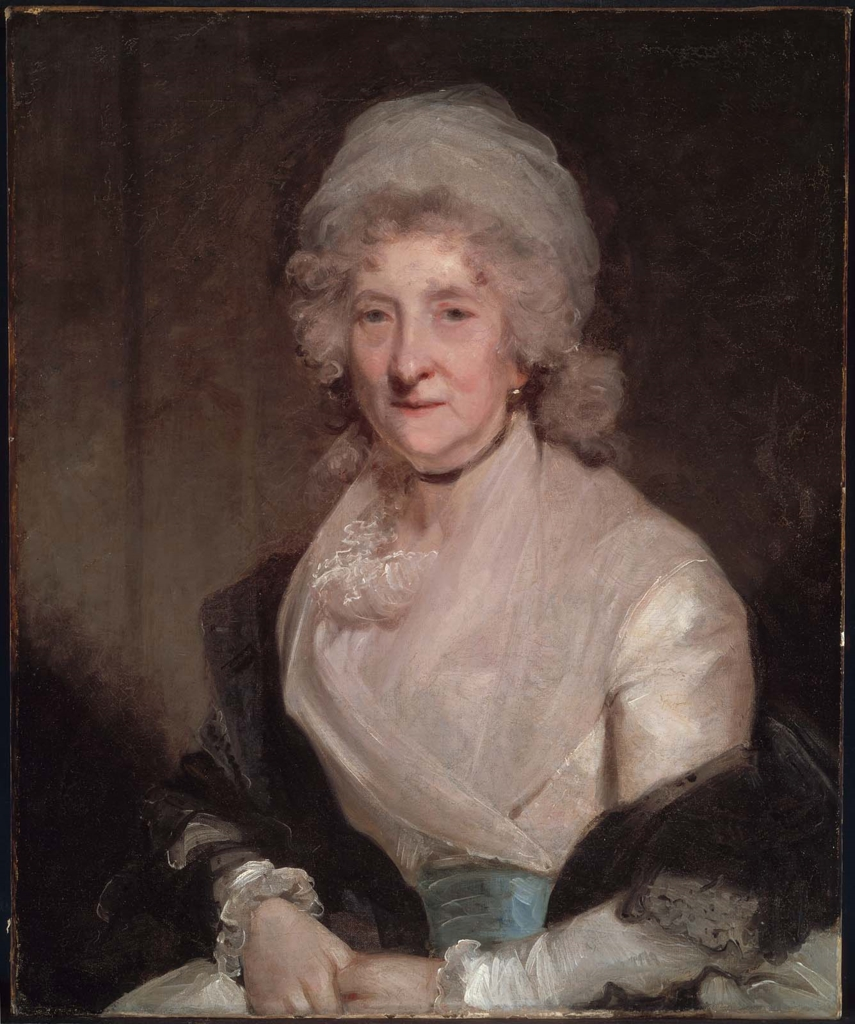
- Portrait by Gilbert Stuartspouse=John Blackwood

Personal details
- Born: Dorcas Stevenson; 1726
- Died: 8 February 1807 (aged 80–81)
- Children: 11, including James
- Parents: James Stevenson (father); Ann Price (mother)

Dorcas Blackwood, 1st Baroness Dufferin and Claneboye (born Dorcas Stevenson; 1726 – 8 February 1807) was the eldest daughter and co-heir of James Stevenson, of Killyleagh, County Down, and his wife Ann, née Price, daughter of General Nicholas Price. Her paternal grandparents were Hans Stevenson and his wife Anne, née Hamilton. Her grandmother was the second daughter and eventually sole heiress of James Hamilton of Neilsbrook, County Antrim. Her great-grandfather was the son of Archibald Hamilton, the next brother of James Hamilton, 1st Viscount Claneboye. Her great-grandfather became the sole heir of Viscount Claneboye when the 1st Viscount's grandson, Henry Hamilton, 3rd Viscount Claneboye, Baron Hamilton, and 2nd Earl of Clanbrassil, died in 1675 with no sons.

She married John Blackwood in May 1751. Her husband succeeded his father, Sir Robert Blackwood, as baronet and was member of parliament for Killyleagh, and later for Bangor. He died on 27 February 1799. After her husband's death, she was raised to the Peerage of Ireland in honour of her husband as Baroness Dufferin and Claneboye, of Ballyleidy and Killyleagh in County Down, on 30 July 1800.

Her children were Robert (1752–1786), James, 2nd Baron Dufferin and Claneboye (1755–1836), John (1757–1833), Hans, 3rd Baron Dufferin and Claneboye (1758–1839), Price (1760–1816), Leeson (1766–1804), Henry (1770–1832), Anne, Sophia, Dorcas and Catharine.

She died on 8 February 1807 and was succeeded by her second son, James, who became 2nd Baron Dufferin and Claneboye.

== Arms ==
Coat of arms of Dorcas Blackwood, 1st Baroness Dufferin and Claneboye
| Coronet A Coronet of an Baron Crest 1st: On a Cap of Maintenance Gules tuned up Ermine a Crescent Argent Escutcheon Azure a Fess Or in chief a Crescent Argent between two Mullets of the second and in base a Mascle of the third Supporters Dexter: a Lion Gules gorged with a Tressure flory counterflory Or; Sinister: an Heraldic Tiger Ermine gorged with a like Tressure Gules Motto Per Vias Rectas (By straight ways) |

Peerage of Ireland
| New creation | Baroness Dufferin and Claneboye; 1800–1807 | Succeeded by James Stevenson Blackwood |
