= Killyleagh =

Village on Strangford Lough, Northern Ireland

Coordinates: 54.40°N 5.65°W

Killyleagh: Irish: Cill Ó Laoch
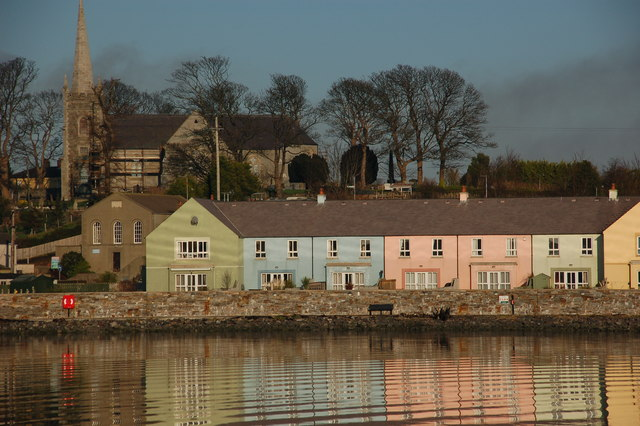
- Killyleagh Harbour and St. John's Church

- Location within County Down
- District: Newry, Mourne and Down
- County: County Down
- Country: Northern Ireland
- Sovereign state: United Kingdom
- Post town: DOWNPATRICK
- Postcode district: BT30
- Police: Northern Ireland
- Fire: Northern Ireland
- Ambulance: Northern Ireland
- UK Parliament: Strangford
- NI Assembly: Strangford

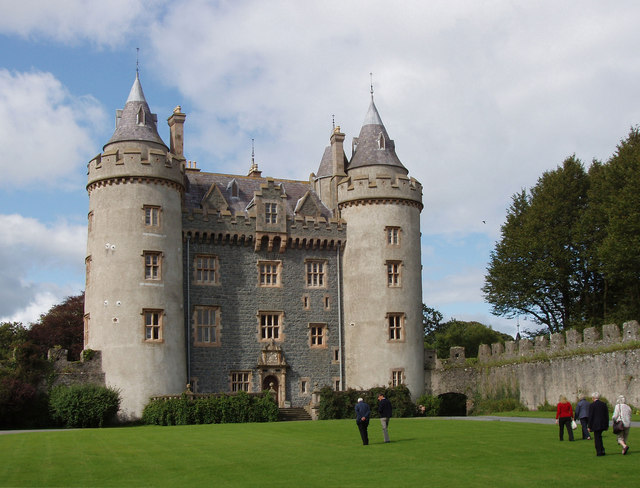
Killyleagh Castle

Killyleagh (/kɪliˈleɪ/; from Irish Cill Ó Laoch, meaning 'church of the descendants of Laoch') is a village and civil parish in County Down, Northern Ireland. It is on the A22 road between Belfast and Downpatrick, on the western side of Strangford Lough. It had a population of 2,787 people in the 2021 Census. It is best known for its twelfth-century Killyleagh Castle. Killyleagh lies within the Newry, Mourne and Down district.

== Demography ==
According to the 2021 Census there were 2,787 people living in Killyleagh. 51% were from a Protestant and 'other Christian religions' background, 37% were from a Catholic background and 12% were irreligious.

== Places of interest ==
- Killyleagh Castle is a private family residence that is said to be the oldest inhabited castle in Ireland. It has been the home of the Hamilton family since the 17th century Plantation of Ulster and acquired its fairy-tale silhouette in the 1850s when the turrets were added, but it is mostly the same castle that the second Earl of Clanbrassil rebuilt in 1666. The castle hosts occasional concerts. In the past, performers have included Van Morrison, Arlo Guthrie, Jackson Browne, Glen Hansard and Bap Kennedy.
- Delamont Country Park is just outside Killyleagh on the road to Downpatrick.

== People ==
- It was the birthplace of Sir Hans Sloane, 1st Bt. He began collecting plants and birds' eggs on the shores of Strangford Lough and his accumulation grew into a priceless collection that formed the nucleus of the British Museum. He was also personal physician to King George II and a slave owner.
- Reverend Edward Hincks, a renowned Assyriologist and Egyptologist, was appointed Church of Ireland rector of Killyleagh in 1825, an office he was to hold for the remaining forty-one years of his life.
- Henry Cooke was the minister of 1st Presbyterian Church, who went on to become Moderator of the General Assembly and a leading exponent of orthodox Presbyterianism in Belfast in the mid-19th century. His statue in Belfast, standing outside the Royal Belfast Academical Institution, is known as "The Black Man".
- Killyleagh is the home town of David Healy, the retired Northern Ireland football player. Healy is Northern Ireland's record goalscorer by a considerable distance, with 36 goals. The second-highest total is 20 goals. He also holds the record for most goals scored in a European Championship Qualifying Phase, with 13 goals during the country's failed bid to reach Euro 2008. Healy's former Bury teammate Trevor Carson is also from Killyleagh.
- Robert Lowry (1824–1904), born in Killyleagh, emigrated to the United States and became a judge and U.S. Representative from Indiana.
- Thomas L. Young (1832–1888), born in Killyleagh, served as Governor of Ohio from 1877 to 1878.
- Vice Admiral Sir Henry Blackwood (1781–1830), born and buried in Killyleagh; senior-ranking officer in the Royal Navy.

== Civil parish of Killyleagh ==
The civil parish is mainly in the barony of Dufferin, with one townland in the barony of Castlereagh Upper. It also contains the village of Killyleagh.

=== Townlands ===
The civil parish contains the following townlands:

- Ardigoa
- Ballyalgan
- Ballygoskin
- Ballymacarron
- Ballymacromwell
- Ballytrim
- Ballywillin
- Clay
- Cluntagh
- Commons
- Corbally
- Corporation
- Derryboy
- Dodd's Island
- Dunnyneill Islands
- Gibb's Island
- Island Taggart
- Killinchy in the Woods
- Kirkland and Toy
- Lisinaw
- Moymore
- Mullagh
- Pawle Island
- Rathcunningham
- Ringdufferin
- Simmy Island
- Toy and Kirkland
- Tullykin
- Tullymacnous
- Tullyveery

== Sport ==
- Killyleagh Youth F.C. play association football in the Northern Amateur Football League.

== See also ==
- Market houses in Northern Ireland
- List of civil parishes of County Down
