= 1878 County Down by-election =

UK Parliamentary by-election

The 1878 Down by-election was fought on 17 May 1878. The by-election was fought due to the death of the incumbent Liberal MP, James Sharman Crawford. It was won by the Conservative candidate Viscount Castlereagh Charles Vane Tempest.
