= Mathew Forde =

Irish landowner and politician

Mathew Forde, also spelt 'Matthew Forde' (17 May 1785 – 5 August 1837) was an Irish landowner and politician.

He was born the eldest son of Mathew Forde of Seaforde, Co. Down and Coolgreany, Co. Wexford and educated at Trinity College, Dublin and Magdalen College, Oxford. He succeeded his father in 1812, inheriting his various estates, including Seaforde in Down and Coogreany in County Wexford.

He was appointed Sheriff of Down for 1820-21 and elected Member of Parliament for County Down in 1821, sitting until 1826.

He died in 1837. He had married twice: firstly Mary Anne, the daughter of Francis Savage of Ardkeen and Hollymount, County Down and secondly Lady Harriet Savage, the daughter of Henry Thomas Butler, 2nd Earl of Carrick and the widow of the same Francis Savage. He had no children and was succeeded in his estates by his brother, the Rev. William Brownlow Forde (1786–1856), who was the father of William Brownlow Forde (1823–1902), the MP for County Down from 1857 to 1874.

Parliament of the United Kingdom
| Preceded by Robert Stewart, Viscount Castlereagh; Lord Arthur Hill | Member of Parliament for Down; 1821 – 1826; With: Lord Arthur Hill | Succeeded by Lord Arthur Hill; Frederick Stewart, Viscount Castlereagh |
