= Frederick Stewart, 4th Marquess of Londonderry =

19th-century Irish marquess

The Most Honourable The Marquess of Londonderry KP PC
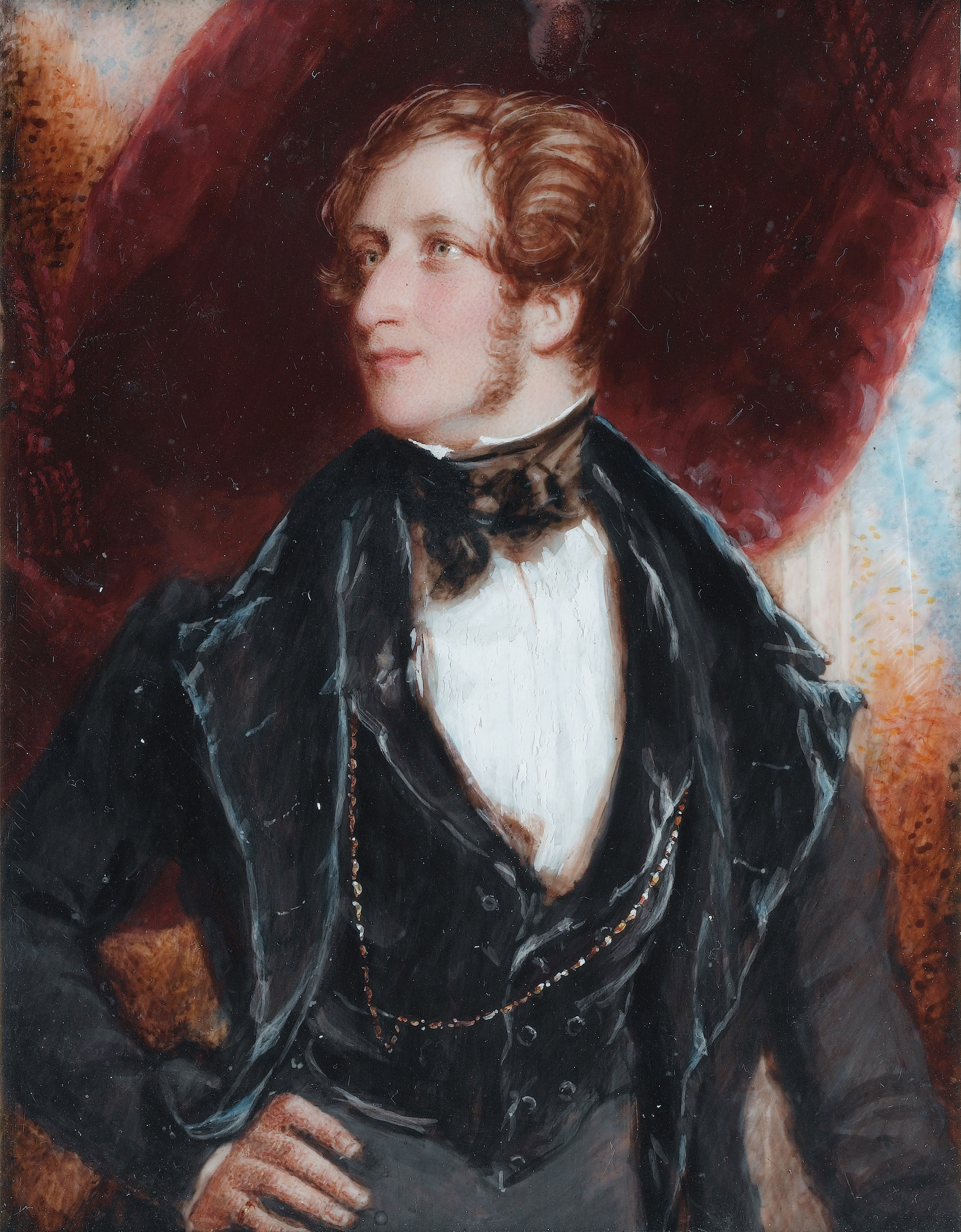
- Portrait by Simon Jacques Rochard, 1833
- Tenure: 1854–1872
- Predecessor: Charles Vane, 3rd Marquess of Londonderry
- Successor: George Vane-Tempest, 5th Marquess of Londonderry
- Born: 7 July 1805; Grosvenor Square, Mayfair, London
- Died: 25 November 1872 (aged 67); White Rock Pavilion, Hastings, Kent
- Buried: Newtownards Priory
- Spouse: Lady Elizabeth Jocelyn
- Father: Charles Vane, 3rd Marquess of Londonderry
- Mother: Catherine Bligh

Frederick William Robert Stewart, 4th Marquess of Londonderry (7 July 1805 – 25 November 1872), styled Viscount Castlereagh from 1822 to 1854, was a British nobleman and Tory politician. He was briefly Vice-Chamberlain of the Household under Sir Robert Peel between December 1834 and April 1835.

== Background and education ==
Frederick Stewart was born on 7 July 1805 at Grosvenor Square, Mayfair, London. He was the only child of Charles Stewart and his first wife Catherine Bligh. His father would become the 3rd Marquess of Londonderry but was at the time only the second son of Robert Stewart, 1st Marquess of Londonderry. His father's family was Ulster-Scots. Frederick's mother was the fourth and youngest daughter of John Bligh, 3rd Earl of Darnley.

He was his father's only son from his father's first marriage. In 1812, while Frederick's father was serving in the army in the Peninsular War, Frederick's mother died. Frederick was seven. His father remarried seven years later in 1819 and Frederick's half-siblings were born.

He was the only child of his parents but had younger half-siblings:

Frederick's half-siblings
1. George Henry Robert Charles William Vane-Tempest (1821–1884), 5th Marquess
2. Frances Anne Emily Vane (1822–1899), married John Spencer-Churchill, 7th Duke of Marlborough
3. Alexandrina Octavia Maria Vane (1823–1874), godchild of Alexander I of Russia, married Henry Dawson-Damer, 3rd Earl of Portarlington
4. Adolphus Frederick Charles William Vane-Tempest (1825–1864), politician, became insane, and had to be medically restrained
5. Adelaide Emelina Caroline Vane (c. 1830 – 1882), disgraced the family by eloping with her brother's tutor, Rev. Frederick Henry Law
6. Ernest McDonnell Vane-Tempest (1836–1885), fell in with a press-gang and had to be bought a commission in the army, from which he was then cashiered

Family tree

Frederick Stewart with wife, parents, and other selected relatives. (Note: This family tree is based on the genealogies of the marquesses of Londonderry. Also see the list of siblings in the text.) His marriage was childless.

Sarah; Frances; Seymour; 1747–1770	Robert; 1st Marquess; 1739–1821	Frances; Pratt c. 1751 – 1833
Robert; 2nd Marquess; 1769–1822; Castlereagh	Amelia; Hobart; 1772–1829	Catherine; Bligh d. 1812	Charles; 3rd Marquess; 1778–1854	Frances; Vane; 1800–1865
Frederick; 4th Marquess; 1805–1872	Elizabeth; Jocelyn; 1813–1884	George; 5th Marquess; 1821–1884	Mary; Edwards d. 1906
Charles; 6th Marquess; 1852–1915	Theresa; Talbot d. 1919

Legend

XXX	Subject of the article	XXX	Marquesses of Londonderry

Following the death of his mother and during his father's absence on military and diplomatic duties, Frederick was largely raised by his uncle and aunt, Lord and Lady Castlereagh. He went to Eton in 1814, where he stayed until 1820. After his father succeeded to the marquessate of Londonderry in 1822, Frederick Stewart became known by the courtesy title Viscount Castlereagh, which was to be his title for 32 years until 1854. He matriculated at Christ Church, Oxford, in 1823.

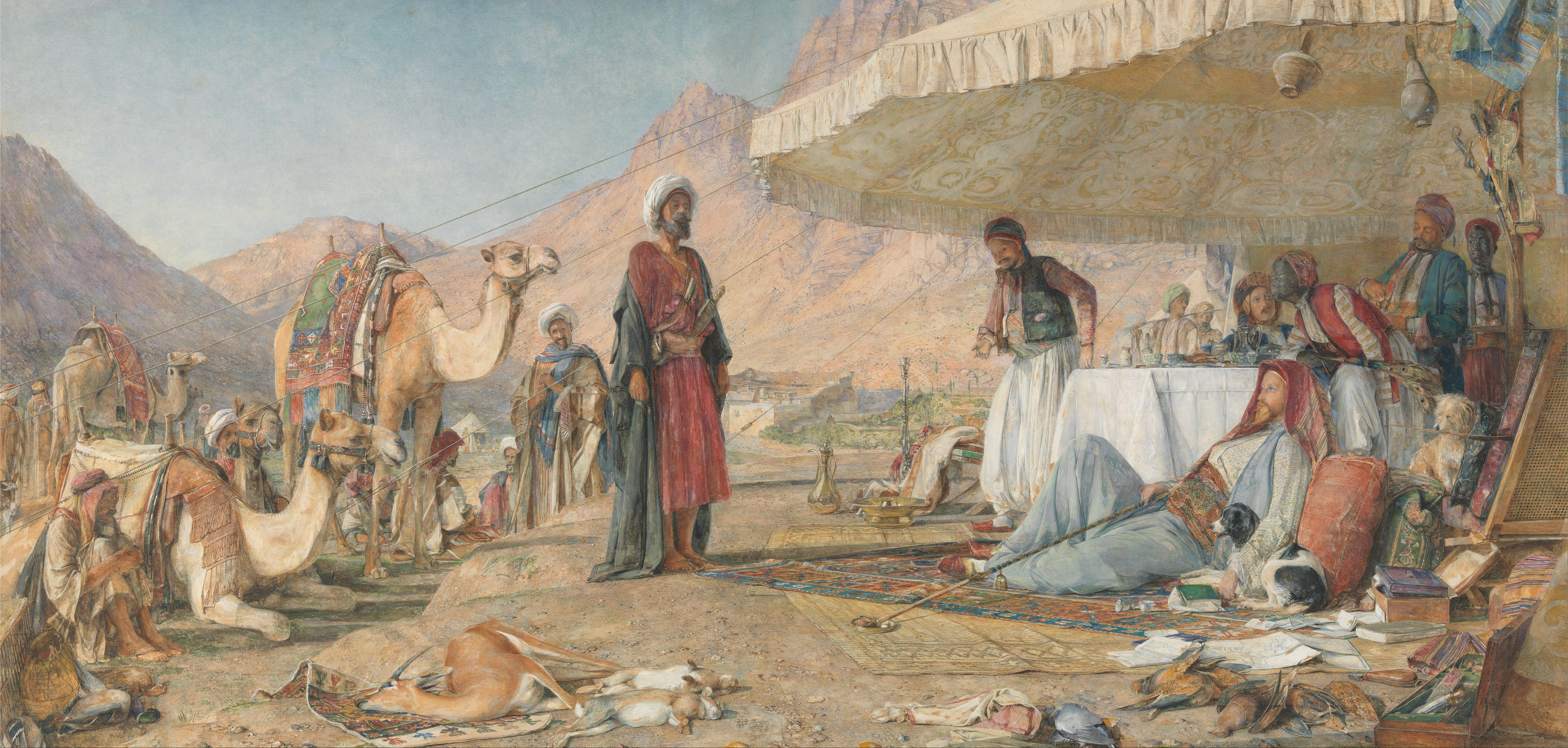
Frederick Stewart at Mount Sinai in May 1842

== Political career ==
He served under the Duke of Wellington as a Lord of the Admiralty from 1828 to 1830 and under Sir Robert Peel as Vice-Chamberlain of the Household from December 1834 to April 1835. On 23 February 1835, he was sworn of the Privy Council of the United Kingdom.

He was one of the Members of Parliament for County Down from 1826 until 1852.

From 1845 until 1864 he was Lord Lieutenant of Down. In 1856 he was made a Knight of the Order of St Patrick.

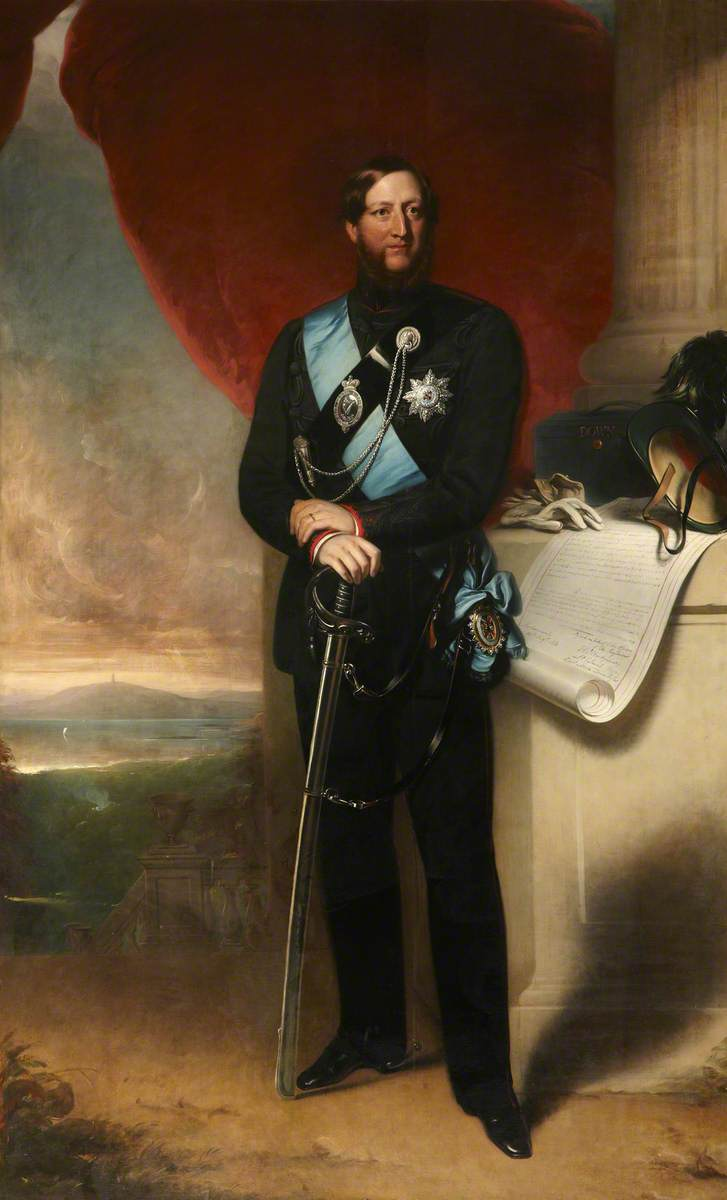
Portrait by James Godsell Middleton, 1856. Frederick Stewart as Marquess of Londonderry. The background on the left shows the view from Mount Stewart over the Strangford Lough on Scrabo Hill with its tower.

== Personal life ==
In 1838, Count Gérard de Melcy, the husband of the Italian operatic singer Giulia Grisi, discovered a letter written to Giulia by Frederick Stewart, and the two men fought a duel on 16 June of that year. Lord Castlereagh was wounded in the wrist; the Count was uninjured. After the duel, Grisi left her husband and began an affair with Lord Castlereagh. Their son, George Frederick Ormsby (1838–1901), was born in November 1838 and brought up by his father.

By 1852, he "had fallen out with his father, the 3rd Marquess of Londonderry, over their views on the land question [and] was obliged to retire because of these differences".

Frederick Stewart married Lady Elizabeth Frances Charlotte Jocelyn, widow of Viscount Powerscourt and daughter of Robert Jocelyn, 3rd Earl of Roden, at the British Embassy in Paris on 2 May 1846. There were no children from the marriage. In 1855 his wife converted to Roman Catholicism.

He succeeded his father in 1854 as the 4th Marquess of Londonderry. He built Scrabo Tower as a monument to the memory of his father. In 1857 he and his wife attended the ceremony of the laying of the foundation stone.

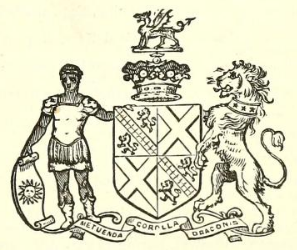
Arms of the 4th Marquess of Londonderry

== Decline, death, and succession ==
In 1862 Londonderry was diagnosed as mentally ill. He was secluded in a mental institution at White Rock Pavilion in Hastings. (Note: This was almost certainly White Rock Villa as the White Rock Pavilion, now called the White Rock Theatre, was not built until 1927.) He died there on 25 November 1872, aged 67 and was buried in the Newtownards Priory. His wife, the dowager Marchioness of Londonderry, died on 2 September 1884, aged 70, and was buried with him in the double grave in the priory.

As he had no legitimate children, he was succeeded in the marquessate by his half-brother, George Vane-Tempest, 2nd Earl Vane. This had the effect that the fortunes of the Stewart and the Vane side of the Londonderry family were reunited in a single hand.

== Ancestry ==
Ancestors of Frederick Stewart, 4th Marquess of Londonderry

8. Alexander Stewart, of Mount Stewart
4. Robert Stewart, 1st Marquess of Londonderry
9. Mary Cowan
2. Charles Vane, 3rd Marquess of Londonderry
10. Charles Pratt, 1st Earl Camden
5. Lady Frances Pratt
11. Elizabeth Jeffreys
1. Frederick Stewart, 4th Marquess of Londonderry
12. John Bligh, 1st Earl of Darnley
6. John Bligh, 3rd Earl of Darnley
13. Theodosia Hyde, 10th Baroness Clifton
3. Lady Catherine Bligh
14. John Stoyte
7. Mary Stoyte
15. Mary Howard

== Notes and references ==
=== Sources ===
- Burke, Bernard (1869). A Genealogical and Heraldic Dictionary of the Peerage and Baronetage of the British Empire (31st ed.). London: Harrison. OCLC 1045624502. – (for his coat of arms)
- Burke, Bernard; Burke, Ashworth Peter (1915). A Genealogical and Heraldic History of the Peerage and Baronetage, the Privy Council, Knightage and Companionage (77th ed.). London: Harrison. OCLC 1155471554. – (for Londonderry)
- Cokayne, George Edward (1893). Complete peerage of England, Scotland, Ireland, Great Britain and the United Kingdom, extant, extinct, or dormant. Vol. V (1st ed.). London: George Bell and Sons. OCLC 1180836840. – L to M (for Londonderry)
- Fleming, N. C. (2005). Marquess of Londonderry: Aristocracy, Power and Politics in Britain and Ireland. London: I B Tauris. ISBN 1-85043-726-2.
- Gordon-Gorman, William James (1899). Converts to Rome (4th ed.). London: Swan Sonnenschein & Co. OCLC 458039774.
- Hyde, Harford Montgomery (1979). The Londonderrys A Family Portrait. London: Hamish Hamilton. ISBN 0-241-10153-0.
- House of Commons (1878). Return. Members of Parliament – Part II. Parliaments of Great Britain, 1705–1796. Parliaments of the United Kingdom, 1801–1874. Parliaments and Conventions of the Estates of Scotland, 1357–1707. Parliaments of Ireland, 1599–1800. London: His/Her Majesty's Stationery Office. OCLC 13112546.

Parliament of the United Kingdom
Preceded by Lord Arthur Hill; Mathew Forde	Member of Parliament for Down; 1826–1852; With: Lord Arthur Hill 1826–36; Earl of Hillsborough 1836–45; Lord Edwin Hill 1845–52	Succeeded by Lord Edwin Hill; David Stewart Ker
Political offices
Preceded by The Earl of Belfast	Vice-Chamberlain of the Household; 1834–1835	Succeeded by Lord Charles FitzRoy
Honorary titles
Preceded by The Marquess of Downshire	Lord Lieutenant of Down; 1845–1864	Succeeded by The Lord Dufferin and Claneboye
Peerage of Ireland
Preceded by Charles Vane	Marquess of Londonderry; 1854–1872	Succeeded by George Vane-Tempest
