= Lord Castlereagh (ship) =

Several ships have been named Lord Castlereagh for Robert Stewart, Viscount Castlereagh. These vessels were sometimes referred to simply as Castlereagh:

- Lord Castlereagh (1802 EIC ship) was launched on the Thames as an East Indiaman She made seven voyages for the British East India Company (EIC) before she was sold in 1820. She then may have sailed one or twice to Bombay under license from the EIC. Her subsequent disposition is obscure.
- Lord Castlereagh (1803 ship) was launched in 1803 at Cochin and spent her entire career as a country ship based in Bombay. She made several voyages to China, during the first of which she was present at the battle of Pulo Aura. She also made a few voyages to England, including one for the EIC. She participated as a transport in the British Invasion of Isle de France. She was lost in 1840 at Bombay coming into harbour.
