= Arthur Hill, 2nd Baron Sandys =

British peer and politician (1793–1860)

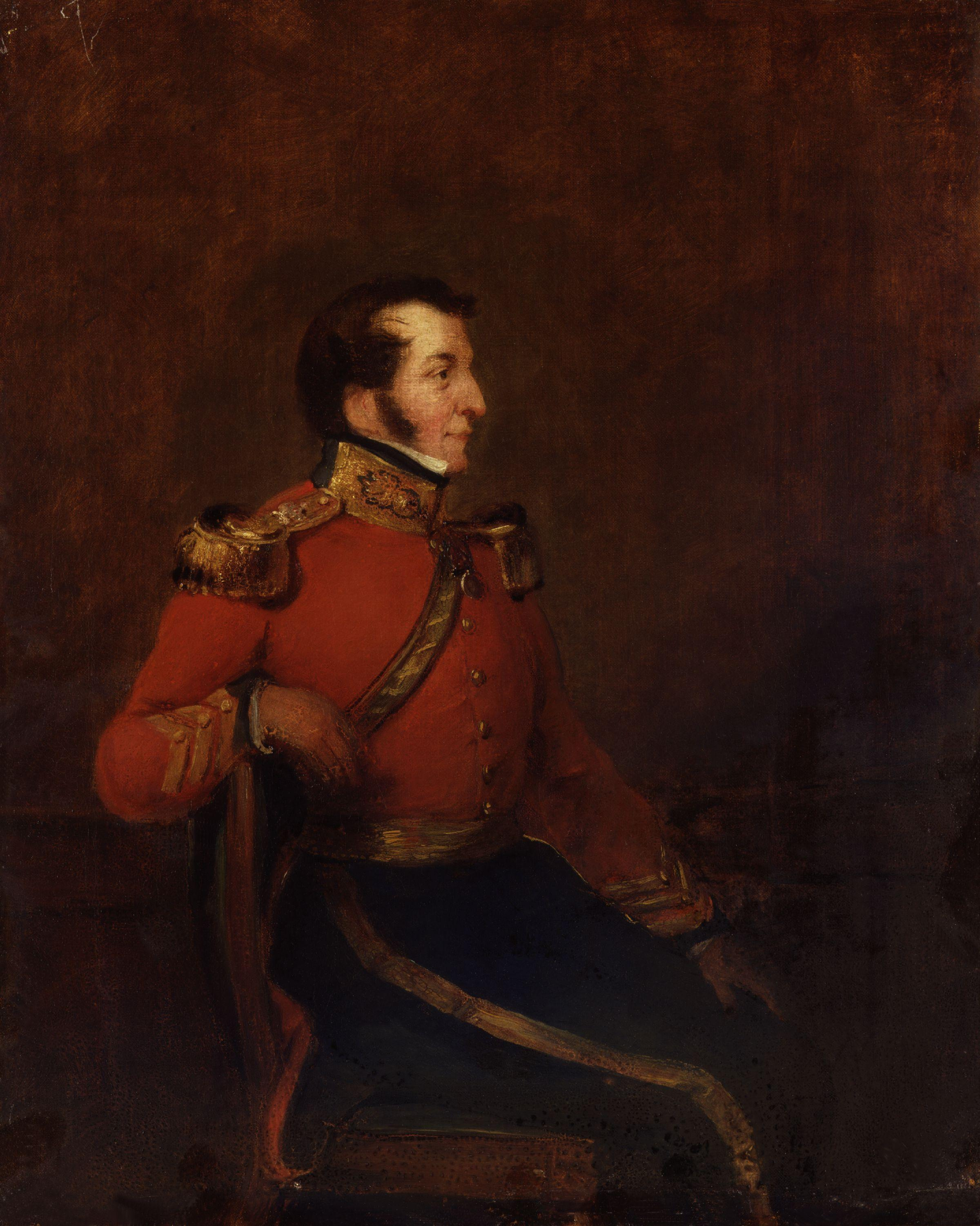
Arthur Hill, 2nd Baron Sandys by William Salter

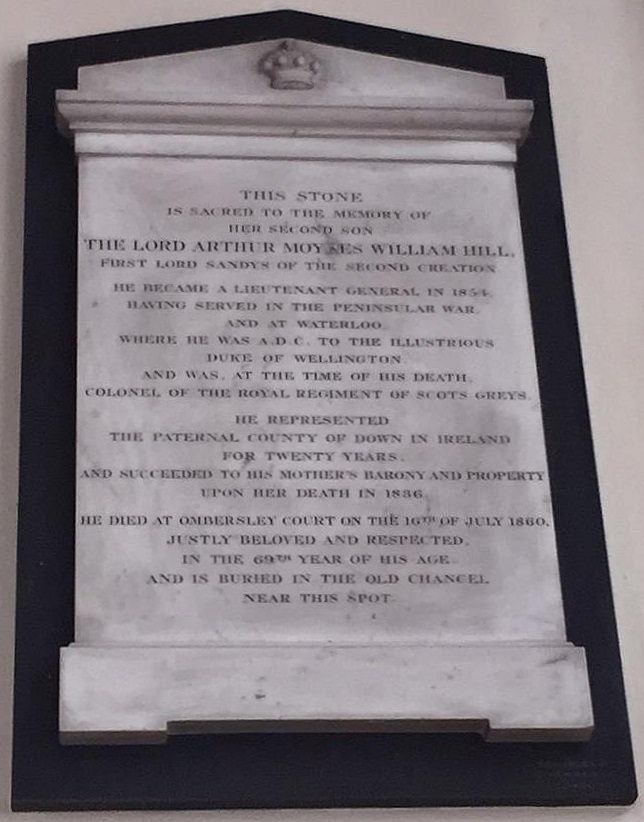
Memorial in Ombersley Church

Lieutenant-General Arthur Moyses William Hill, 2nd Baron Sandys (10 January 1792 – 16 July 1860), styled as Lord Arthur Hill until 1836, was an Anglo-Irish soldier and politician.

== Background ==
Hill was the second son of Arthur Hill, 2nd Marquess of Downshire, and Mary, daughter and heiress of Colonel the Honourable Martin Sandys, son of Samuel Sandys, 1st Baron Sandys. His mother was created Baroness Sandys in her own right in 1802, with remainder to her younger sons.

== Military service ==
He joined the army in 1809 as a Cornet in the 10th Hussars. He was promoted to lieutenant in 1810 and to captain in 1813. He served in the Peninsular War, including at the Battles of Vittoria and Pampeluna.

He served in the Battle of Waterloo as one of Wellington's aides de camp, with the rank of captain. He was supposedly the fattest young man in the British Army.

He remained in the army until 1858, ultimately rising to the rank of colonel of the 7th Dragoons.

== Political career ==
Hill entered Parliament as one of two representatives for County Down in 1817, a seat he held until 1836, when he succeeded his mother in the barony.

== Personal life ==
Hill died in July 1860, aged 68. He never married. He was succeeded in the barony by his younger brother, Lord Marcus.

== Arms ==
Coat of arms of Arthur Hill, 2nd Baron Sandys

Crest
1st: a Griffin segreant per fess Or and Gules (Sandys); 2nd: a Reindeer's Head couped at the neck Gules attired and plain collared Or (Hill)
Escutcheon
Quarterly: 1st and 4th, Or a Fess dancetty between three Cross Crosslets fitchy Gules (Sandys); 2nd and 3rd, Sable on a Fess Argent between three Leopards passant guardant Or spotted of the field as many Escallops Gules (Hill)
Supporters
On either side a Griffin wings elevated per fess Or and Gules gorged with a Collar dancetty of the last
Motto
Probum Non Paenitet (The honest man has not to repent)

Parliament of the United Kingdom
Preceded by John Meade; Viscount Castlereagh	Member of Parliament for County Down; 1817–1836; With: Viscount Castlereagh 1817–1836; Mathew Forde 1821–1826; Viscount Castlereagh 1826–1836	Succeeded by Viscount Castlereagh; Earl of Hillsborough
Military offices
Preceded by Archibald Money	Colonel of the 2nd (Royal North British) Regiment of Dragoons; 1858–1860	Succeeded by Sir Alexander Clark-Kennedy
Peerage of the United Kingdom
Preceded by Mary Hill	Baron Sandys; 1836–1860	Succeeded by Marcus Sandys
