= Lord Lieutenant of Down =

Ceremonial officer in Down, Northern Ireland

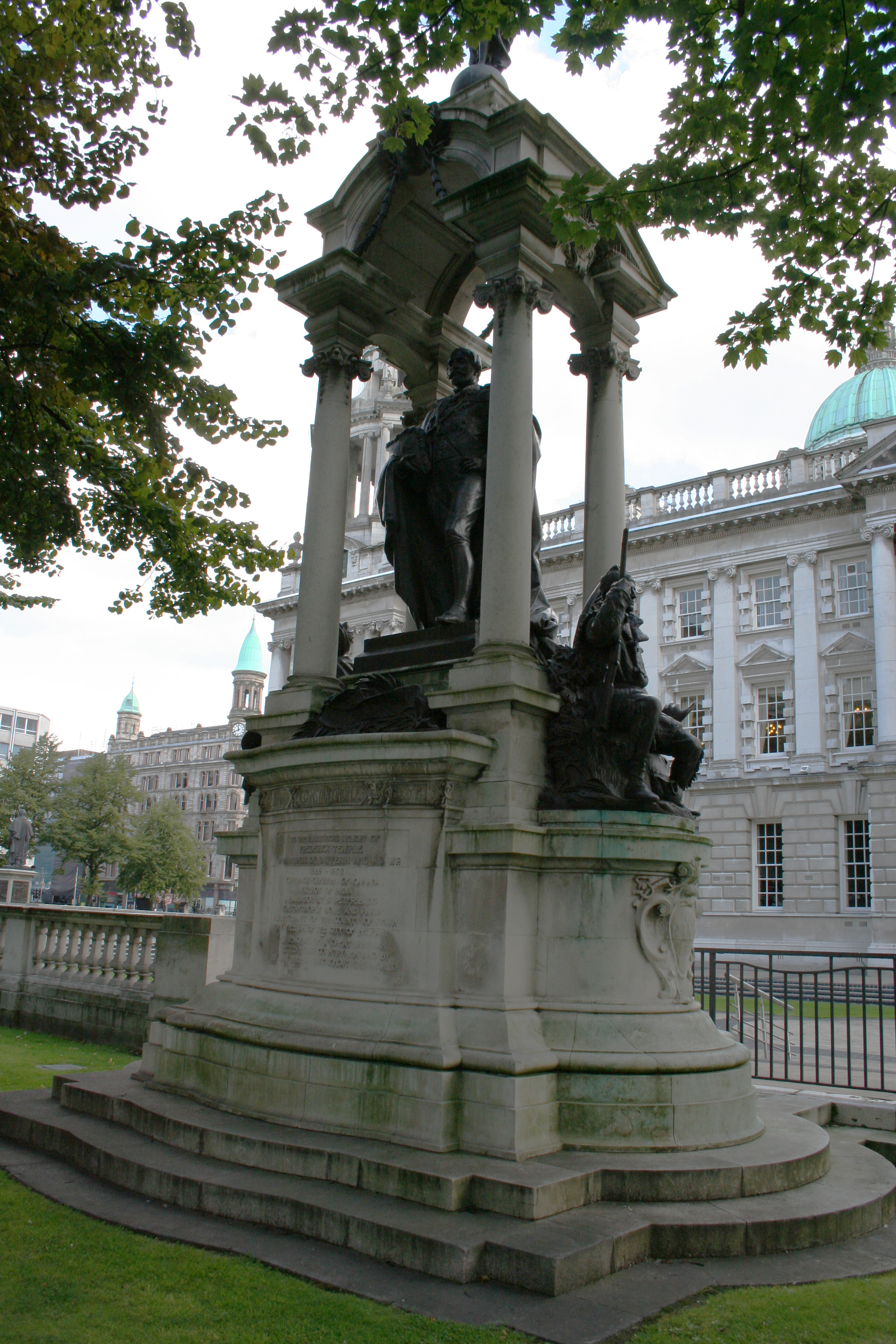
Monument to Lord Dufferin, one-time Governor General of Canada and Viceroy of India, in the grounds of Belfast City Hall, Belfast, Northern Ireland

This is a list of lords lieutenants of County Down.

There were lieutenants of counties in Ireland until the reign of James II, when they were renamed governors. The office of Lord Lieutenant was recreated on 23 August 1831.

== Governors ==
- Bryan Magennis, 5th Viscount Iveagh 1689–1691 (Jacobite)
- Trevor Hill, 1st Viscount Hillsborough 1729–
- Wills Hill, 1st Marquess of Downshire –1793
- Robert Stewart, 1st Marquess of Londonderry 1793–1821
- James Blackwood, 2nd Baron Dufferin and Claneboye: –1831
- Robert Ward: 1805–1831
- Charles Vane, 3rd Marquess of Londonderry: –1831

== Lord Lieutenants ==
- Arthur Hill, 3rd Marquess of Downshire: 7 October 1831 – 12 April 1845
- Frederick Stewart, 4th Marquess of Londonderry: 17 May 1845 – 1864
- Frederick Hamilton-Temple-Blackwood, 1st Marquess of Dufferin and Ava: 13 April 1864 – 12 February 1902, later Earl of Dufferin and Marquess of Dufferin and Ava
- Charles Vane-Tempest-Stewart, 6th Marquess of Londonderry: 16 April 1902 – 8 February 1915
- Charles Vane-Tempest-Stewart, 7th Marquess of Londonderry: 8 September 1915 – 11 February 1949
- Francis Needham, 4th Earl of Kilmorey: 2 June 1949 – 1959
- Sir Roland Nugent, 1st Baronet: 10 March 1959 – 18 August 1962
- John Meade, 6th Earl of Clanwilliam: 25 September 1962 – 1979
- Colonel William Brann: 2 October 1979 – 1990
- Colonel William Brownlow: 17 August 1990 – 1996
- Sir William Joseph Hall: 10 October 1996 – 1 August 2009
- David Lindsay: 25 August 2009 – 2021
- Gawn Rowan-Hamilton: 12 May 2021 – present

== Deputy lieutenants ==
A deputy lieutenant of County Down is commissioned by the Lord Lieutenant of County Down. Deputy lieutenants support the work of the lord-lieutenant. There can be several deputy lieutenants at any time, depending on the population of the county. Their appointment does not terminate with the changing of the lord-lieutenant, but they usually retire at age 75.

=== 21st Century ===
- 19 May 2010: John Witchell
- 2 September 2016: Peter Conway
- 2 September 2016: Neil McClure
