= Edwin Hill-Trevor, 1st Baron Trevor =

British politician

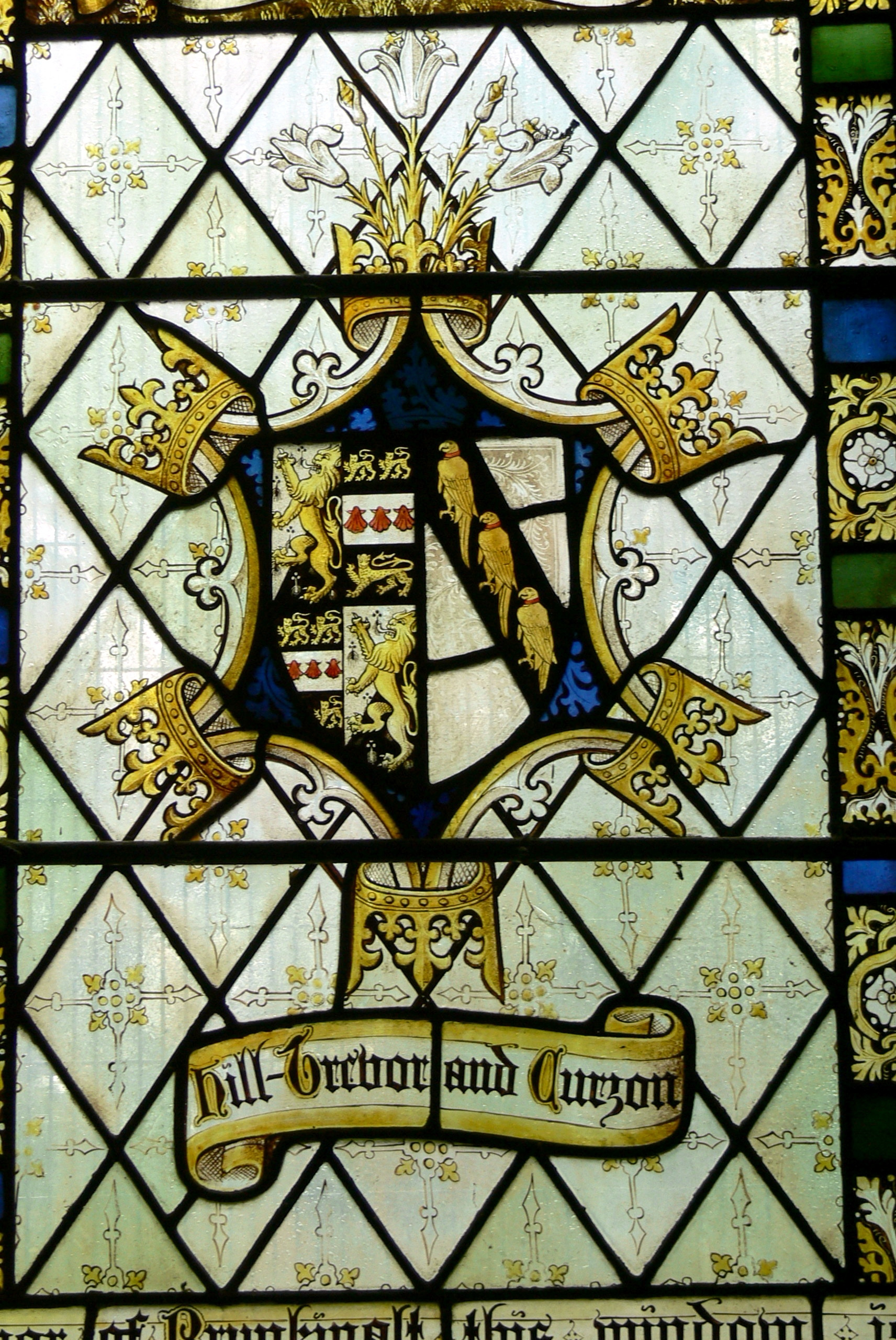
Arms of 1st Baron Trevor impaling Curzon. St.Mary's Church, Chirk, Wales

Arthur Edwin Hill-Trevor, 1st Baron Trevor (4 November 1819 – 25 December 1894), styled as Lord Edwin Hill until 1862 and as Lord Edwin Hill-Trevor from 1862 to 1880, was an Anglo-Irish politician who served as a long-standing Conservative Member of Parliament.

Hill-Trevor was the third son of Arthur Hill, 3rd Marquess of Downshire, and his wife Lady Maria (née Windsor). He was elected to the House of Commons for County Down in 1845, a seat he held for the next 35 years.

In 1862, on the death of their kinsman Arthur Hill-Trevor, 3rd Viscount Dungannon (on whose death the viscountcy became extinct) this branch of the Hill family succeeded to the Trevor and Dungannon estates. By arrangement parts of the estates, including Brynkinalt in Wales, passed to Lord Edwin, who assumed by royal licence the additional surname of Trevor. In 1880 he was raised to the peerage as Baron Trevor, of Brynkinalt in the County of Denbigh.

As Lord Edwin Hill-Trevor, Lord Trevor was a captain in the North Shropshire Yeomanry Cavalry, promoted major in 1862, but retired from the regiment prior to its amalgamation into the unified Shropshire Yeomanry regiment in 1872.

Lord Trevor married, firstly, Mary Emily, daughter of Sir Richard Sutton, 2nd Baronet, in 1848. After her death in 1855 he married, secondly, the Hon. Mary Catherine, daughter of Reverend the Hon. Alfred Curzon, in 1858. Trevor died in December 1894, aged 75, and was succeeded in the barony by his son from his first marriage, Arthur. Lady Trevor died in 1912.

== Notes ==
Parliament of the United Kingdom
Preceded by Earl of Hillsborough; Frederick, Viscount Castlereagh	Member of Parliament for Down; 1845–1880; With: Frederick, Viscount Castlereagh 1845–1852; David Stewart Ker 1852–1857; William Brownlow Forde 1857–1874; James Sharman Crawford 1874–1878; Charles, Viscount Castlereagh 1878–1880	Succeeded by Lord Arthur Hill; Charles, Viscount Castlereagh
Peerage of the United Kingdom
New creation	Baron Trevor; 3rd creation 1880–1894	Succeeded by Arthur William Hill-Trevor
