= Newtownards Priory =

Ruins of a church establishment in Northern Ireland

Coordinates: 54.591°N 5.692°W

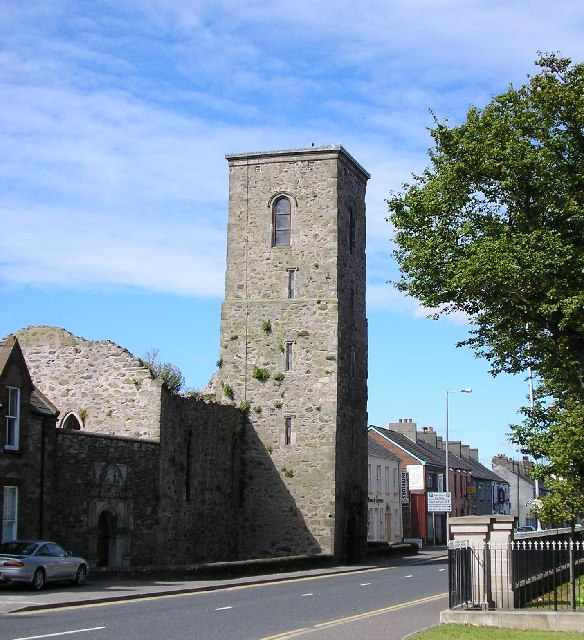

Monastery information
- Order: Dominican Order
- Established: c. 1244
- Disestablished: 1541

People
- Founder(s): the Savage family

Site
- Location: Newtownards, County Down
- Public access: Yes

Newtownards Priory was a medieval Dominican priory founded by the Savage family around 1244 in the village of Newtownards, County Down, Northern Ireland. Only the lower parts of the nave and two blocked doors in the south wall leading to a demolished cloister, survive from the period of the priory's foundation. The upper parts of the nave date from a 14th-century rebuilding and the western extension and the north aisle arcade were undertaken by the de Burgh family.

The priory was dissolved in 1541, and was sacked and burned. It was granted to Hugh Montgomery who built a house within the ruins, rebuilding the north aisle and adding a tower at the entrance.

The church contains the double grave of Frederick Stewart, 4th Marquess of Londonderry (1805–1872) and his wife Elizabeth née Jocelyn, Marchioness of Londonderry (1813–1884).
