= Down (UK Parliament constituency) =

Parliamentary constituency in the United Kingdom, 1922–1950

County Down
- Former county constituency for the House of Commons
- County: County Down

1801–1885
- Seats: 2
- Created from: County Down (IHC)
- Replaced by: East Down; North Down; South Down; West Down

1922–1950
- Seats: 2
- Created from: East Down; Mid Down; North Down; South Down; West Down
- Replaced by: North Down; South Down

County Down or Down is a former county constituency in the House of Commons of the United Kingdom. It was a two-member constituency in Ireland from 1801 to 1885 and in Northern Ireland from 1922 to 1950.

== History and boundaries ==
County Down had been represented by two seats in the Irish House of Commons. From 1801, under the Acts of Union 1800, it was represented by a county constituency with two MPs in the United Kingdom House of Commons. It consisted of County Down, except the parts in the parliamentary borough constituencies of Belfast, Downpatrick and Lisburn. The boroughs of Bangor, Hillsborough, Killyleagh and Newtownards were disfranchised in 1801.

At the 1885 general election, Downpatrick and Newry were disfranchised and the borders of the parliamentary borough of Belfast were extended under the Redistribution of Seats Act 1885. The county was split between the divisions of East Down, North Down, South Down and West Down.

At the 1922 general election, following the establishment of the Parliament of Northern Ireland, the number of seats in Northern Ireland at Westminster was cut from 30 to 13 under the Government of Ireland Act 1920. The constituency of Down was recreated to elect two MPs, consisting of the administrative county of Down, that is the whole of County Down excluding the part in the city of Belfast. An eight-seat constituency of Down was also created for the House of Commons of Northern Ireland.

At the 1950 general election, the county was split between the divisions of North Down and South Down, under the Representation of the People Act 1948, which abolished all multi-member constituencies in the United Kingdom.

== Members of Parliament ==
=== 1801–1885 ===
Election	First member	First party	Second member	Second party
1801	Robert Stewart, Viscount Castlereagh	Tory	Francis Savage	
1802	Robert Stewart, Viscount Castlereagh	Tory	Francis Savage	
1805 (b)	Hon. John Meade	Whig	Francis Savage	
1806	Hon. John Meade	Whig	Francis Savage	
1807	Hon. John Meade	Whig	Francis Savage	
1812 (b)	Hon. John Meade	Whig	Hon. Robert Ward	
1812	Hon. John Meade	Whig	Robert Stewart, Viscount Castlereagh	Tory
1817 (b)	Lord Arthur Hill	Whig	Robert Stewart, Viscount Castlereagh	Tory
1818	Lord Arthur Hill	Whig	Robert Stewart, Viscount Castlereagh	Tory
1820	Lord Arthur Hill	Whig	Robert Stewart, Viscount Castlereagh	Tory
1821 (b)	Lord Arthur Hill	Whig	Mathew Forde	Tory
1826	Lord Arthur Hill	Whig	Frederick Stewart, Viscount Castlereagh	Tory
1830	Lord Arthur Hill	Whig	Frederick Stewart, Viscount Castlereagh	Tory
1831	Lord Arthur Hill	Whig	Frederick Stewart, Viscount Castlereagh	Tory
1834	Lord Arthur Hill	Whig	Frederick Stewart, Viscount Castlereagh	Conservative
1832	Lord Arthur Hill	Whig	Frederick Stewart, Viscount Castlereagh	Conservative
1835	Lord Arthur Hill	Whig	Frederick Stewart, Viscount Castlereagh	Conservative
1836 (b)	Earl of Hillsborough	Conservative	Frederick Stewart, Viscount Castlereagh	Conservative
1837	Earl of Hillsborough	Conservative	Frederick Stewart, Viscount Castlereagh	Conservative
1841	Earl of Hillsborough	Conservative	Frederick Stewart, Viscount Castlereagh	Conservative
1845 (b)	Lord Arthur Hill-Trevor	Conservative	Frederick Stewart, Viscount Castlereagh	Conservative
1847	Lord Arthur Hill-Trevor	Conservative	Frederick Stewart, Viscount Castlereagh	Conservative
1852	Lord Arthur Hill-Trevor	Conservative	David Stewart Ker	Conservative
1857	Lord Arthur Hill-Trevor	Conservative	William Brownlow Forde	Conservative
1859	Lord Arthur Hill-Trevor	Conservative	William Brownlow Forde	Conservative
1865	Lord Arthur Hill-Trevor	Conservative	William Brownlow Forde	Conservative
1868	Lord Arthur Hill-Trevor	Conservative	William Brownlow Forde	Conservative
1874	Lord Arthur Hill-Trevor	Conservative	James Sharman Crawford	Liberal
1878 (b)	Lord Arthur Hill-Trevor	Conservative	Charles Vane-Tempest-Stewart, Viscount Castlereagh	Conservative
1880	Lord Arthur Hill	Conservative	Charles Vane-Tempest-Stewart, Viscount Castlereagh	Conservative
1884 (b)	Lord Arthur Hill	Conservative	Richard Ker	Conservative
1885	constituency abolished: see East Down, West Down, South Down and North Down			

=== 1922–1950 ===
Election	First member	First party	Second member	Second party
1922	David Reid	Ulster Unionist Party	John Simms	Ulster Unionist Party
1931	David Reid	Ulster Unionist Party	Viscount Castlereagh	Ulster Unionist Party
1939	James Little	Ulster Unionist Party	Viscount Castlereagh	Ulster Unionist Party
1945	James Little	Independent Unionist	Walter Smiles	Ulster Unionist Party
1946	C. H. Mullan	Ulster Unionist Party	Walter Smiles	Ulster Unionist Party

== Elections ==
=== Elections in the 1940s ===
1946 Down by-election
Party	Candidate	Votes	%	±%
UUP	C. H. Mullan	50,699	51.4	+30.5
NI Labour	Desmond Donnelly	28,846	29.3	New
Ind. Unionist	J. Hastings-Little	16,895	17.1	−23.3
Ind. Unionist	James Brown	2,125	2.2	−16.9
Majority		21,853	22.1	N/A
Turnout		98,565		
UUP gain from Ind. Unionist		Swing		

1945 general election: Down (2 seats)
Party	Candidate	Votes	%	±%
Ind. Unionist	James Little	46,732	40.4	N/A
UUP	Walter Smiles	24,148	20.9	−22.6
UUP	John Blakiston Houston	22,730	19.6	−26.8
Ind. Unionist	James Brown	22,163	19.1	New
Majority		24,002	20.8	N/A
Turnout		115,773	39.8	−16.9
Ind. Unionist gain from UUP		Swing	N/A	
UUP hold		Swing		

=== Elections in the 1930s ===
1939 Down by-election
Party	Candidate	Votes	%	±%
UUP	James Little	Unopposed		
UUP hold				

1935 general election: Down (2 seats)
Party	Candidate	Votes	%	±%
UUP	David Reid	66,324	46.4	N/A
UUP	Robin Vane-Tempest-Stewart	58,777	43.5	N/A
Ind. Republican	Patrick O'Hagan	20,236	13.3	New
Majority		38,541	30.2	N/A
Turnout		145,337	56.7	N/A
UUP hold		Swing	N/A	
UUP hold		Swing	N/A	

1931 general election: Down (2 seats)
Party	Candidate	Votes	%	±%
UUP	David Reid	Unopposed		
UUP	Robin Vane-Tempest-Stewart	Unopposed		
UUP hold				
UUP hold				

=== Elections in the 1920s ===
1929 general election: Down (2 seats)
Party	Candidate	Votes	%	±%
UUP	David Reid	54,073	36.3	−10.2
UUP	John Simms	53,943	36.2	−10.2
Ulster Liberal	Robert Pollock	20,999	14.1	New
Ulster Liberal	David Johnston	20,013	13.4	New
Majority		32,944	22.1	−17.2
Turnout		149,028	58.5	−7.3
UUP hold		Swing		
UUP hold		Swing		

1924 general election: Down (2 seats)
Party	Candidate	Votes	%	±%
UUP	David Reid	58,929	46.5	N/A
UUP	John Simms	58,777	46.4	N/A
Sinn Féin	Michael Murney	8,941	7.1	New
Majority		49,836	39.3	N/A
Turnout		117,706	65.8	N/A
UUP hold		Swing	N/A	
UUP hold		Swing	N/A	

1923 general election: Down (2 seats)
Party	Candidate	Votes	%	±%
UUP	David Reid	Unopposed		
UUP	John Simms	Unopposed		
UUP hold				
UUP hold				

1922 general election: Down (2 seats)
Party	Candidate	Votes	%	±%
UUP	David Reid	Unopposed		
UUP	John Simms	Unopposed		
UUP win (new seat)				
UUP win (new seat)				

=== Elections in the 1880s ===
By-election, 8 July 1885: Down
Party	Candidate	Votes	%	±%
Conservative	Arthur Hill	5,097	52.0	−15.2
Liberal	John Shaw Brown	4,696	48.0	+15.3
Majority		401	4.0	+3.9
Turnout		9,793	78.9	−7.6
Registered electors		12,412		
Conservative hold		Swing	−15.3	

- Caused by Hill's appointment as Comptroller of the Household.

By-election, 27 Nov 1884: Down (1 seat)
Party	Candidate	Votes	%	±%
Conservative	Richard Ker	4,387	52.3	−14.9
Liberal	Arthur Crawford (Liberal politician)	3,998	47.7	+15.0
Majority		389	4.6	+4.5
Turnout		8,385	67.6	−18.9 (est)
Registered electors		12,412		
Conservative hold		Swing	−15.0	

The electorate was 12,718 in 1881.

- Caused by Vane-Tempest's succession to the peerage, becoming Marquess of Londonderry.

General election 1880: Down (2 seats)
Party	Candidate	Votes	%	±%
Conservative	Arthur Hill	5,873	34.4	−0.2
Conservative	Charles Vane-Tempest	5,599	32.8	+0.6
Liberal	John Crawford (Liberal politician)	5,579	32.7	−0.4
Majority		20	0.1	−1.4
Turnout		11,452 (est)	86.5 (est)	+4.5
Registered electors		13,236		
Conservative hold		Swing	0.0	
Conservative hold		Swing	+0.4	

Blakely McCartney brought a petition against Vane-Tempest under the Parliamentary Elections Act 1868, which was tried in June by Francis Alexander FitzGerald and Charles Robert Barry. FitzGerald found no corrupt practices, while Barry found there was undue influence in favour of Vane-Tempest but not with his knowledge or consent.

=== Elections in the 1870s ===
By-election, 17 May 1878: Down
Party	Candidate	Votes	%	±%
Conservative	Charles Vane-Tempest	6,076	56.4	−10.4
Liberal	William Drennan Andrews	4,701	43.6	+10.5
Majority		1,375	12.8	N/A
Turnout		10,777	84.1	+2.1
Registered electors		12,814		
Conservative gain from Liberal		Swing	−10.5	

- Sharman Crawford's death caused a by-election.

General election 1874: Down
Party	Candidate	Votes	%	±%
Conservative	Edwin Hill-Trevor	5,029	34.6	N/A
Liberal	James Sharman Crawford	4,814	33.1	New
Conservative	William Brownlow Forde	4,683	32.2	N/A
Turnout		9,670 (est)	82.0 (est)	N/A
Registered electors		11,797		
Majority		215	1.5	N/A
Conservative hold		Swing	N/A	
Majority		131	0.9	N/A
Liberal gain from Conservative		Swing	N/A	

=== Elections in the 1860s ===
General election 1868: Down
Party	Candidate	Votes	%	±%
Conservative	Edwin Hill-Trevor	Unopposed		
Conservative	William Brownlow Forde	Unopposed		
Registered electors		11,646		
Conservative hold				
Conservative hold				

General election 1865: Down
Party	Candidate	Votes	%	±%
Conservative	Edwin Hill-Trevor	Unopposed		
Conservative	William Brownlow Forde	Unopposed		
Registered electors		11,435		
Conservative hold				
Conservative hold				

The electorate was 11,470 in 1862.

=== Elections in the 1850s ===
General election 1859: Down
Party	Candidate	Votes	%	±%
Conservative	Edwin Hill	Unopposed		
Conservative	William Brownlow Forde	Unopposed		
Registered electors		11,367		
Conservative hold				
Conservative hold				

General election 1857: Down
Party	Candidate	Votes	%	±%
Conservative	Edwin Hill	5,839	39.1	−0.1
Conservative	William Brownlow Forde	5,341	35.8	+1.2
Peelite	David Stewart Ker	3,735	25.0	N/A
Majority		1,606	10.8	+2.4
Turnout		9,325 (est)	86.7 (est)	+11.9
Registered electors		10,759		
Conservative hold		Swing	+0.3	
Conservative hold		Swing	+0.9	

The Poll Books for part of County Down, showing how each elector voted in the 1857 general election are available in the Public Record Office of Northern Ireland under reference D/671/O/2/7-8.

General election 1852: Down
Party	Candidate	Votes	%	±%
Conservative	Edwin Hill	4,654	39.2	N/A
Conservative	David Stewart Ker	4,117	34.6	N/A
Radical	William Sharman Crawford	3,113	26.2	New
Majority		1,004	8.4	N/A
Turnout		7,499 (est)	74.8 (est)	N/A
Registered electors		10,028		
Conservative hold		Swing	N/A	
Conservative hold		Swing	N/A	

The Poll Books for part of County Down, showing how each elector voted in the 1852 general election are available in the Public Record Office of Northern Ireland under reference D/671/O/2/5-6.

=== Elections in the 1840s ===
General election 1847: Down
Party	Candidate	Votes	%	±%
Conservative	Edwin Hill	Unopposed		
Conservative	Frederick Stewart	Unopposed		
Registered electors		2,446		
Conservative hold				
Conservative hold				

By-election, 3 June 1845: Down
Party	Candidate	Votes	%	±%
Conservative	Edwin Hill	Unopposed		
Conservative hold				

- Caused by Hill's succession to the peerage, becoming 4th Marquess of Downshire

General election 1841: Down
Party	Candidate	Votes	%	±%
Conservative	Arthur Hill	Unopposed		
Conservative	Frederick Stewart	Unopposed		
Registered electors		2,215		
Conservative hold				
Conservative hold				

=== Elections in the 1830s ===
General election 1837: Down
Party	Candidate	Votes	%
Conservative	Arthur Hill	Unopposed	
Conservative	Frederick Stewart	Unopposed	
Registered electors		3,525	
Conservative hold			
Conservative gain from Whig			

By-election, 30 August 1836: Down
Party	Candidate	Votes	%
Conservative	Arthur Hill	Unopposed	
Conservative gain from Whig			

- Caused by Arthur Hill's succession as 2nd Baron Sandys

General election 1835: Down
Party	Candidate	Votes	%
Whig	Arthur Hill	Unopposed	
Conservative	Frederick Stewart	Unopposed	
Registered electors		3,729	
Whig hold			
Conservative hold			

General election 1832: Down
Party	Candidate	Votes	%
Whig	Arthur Hill	Unopposed	
Tory	Frederick Stewart	Unopposed	
Registered electors		3,130	
Whig hold			
Tory hold			

General election 1831: Down
Party	Candidate	Votes	%	±%
Whig	Arthur Hill	1,671	45.7	+12.7
Tory	Frederick Stewart	1,067	29.2	−7.5
Radical	William Sharman Crawford	917	25.1	N/A
Turnout		c. 1,828	c. 91.8	c. +12.9
Registered electors		1,990		
Majority		604	16.5	+13.7
Whig hold		Swing	+10.1	
Majority		150	4.1	+0.4
Tory hold		Swing	−10.1	

General election 1830: Down
Party	Candidate	Votes	%	±%
Tory	Frederick Stewart	930	36.7	−12.6
Whig	Arthur Hill	837	33.0	−16.5
Whig	Mathew Forde	766	30.2	N/A
Turnout		1,570	78.9	
Registered electors		1,990		
Majority		93	3.7	−44.4
Tory hold		Swing		
Majority		71	2.8	−45.5
Whig hold		Swing		

=== Elections in the 1820s ===
At the by-election on 15 July 1829 following Frederick Stewart's appointment as a Lord Commissioner of the Admiralty, he was re-elected unopposed.

General election 1826: Down
Party	Candidate	Votes	%	±%
Whig	Arthur Hill	667	49.5	N/A
Tory	Frederick Stewart	665	49.3	N/A
Tory	John Stewart	16	1.2	N/A
Majority		649	48.1	N/A
Turnout		1,348		
Whig hold		Swing		
Tory hold		Swing		

At the by-election on 9 May 1821 following Robert Stewart vacating his seat, Mathew Forde was returned unopposed.

=== Elections in the 1810s ===
At the 1818 and 1820 general elections, Arthur Hill and Robert Stewart were elected unopposed.

At the by-election on 26 February 1817 following the Hon. John Meade's appointment as consul general in Spain, Arthur Hill was returned unopposed.

The electorate was approximately 15,000 in 1815.

General election 1812: Down
Party	Candidate	Votes	%	±%
Tory	Robert Stewart	55	50.9	N/A
Nonpartisan	John Meade	52	48.1	N/A
Nonpartisan	Eldred Pottinger	13	12.0	N/A
Majority		39	36.1	N/A
Turnout		118		
Tory hold		Swing		
Nonpartisan hold		Swing		

At the by-election on 30 May 1812 following Francis Savage's acceptance of the Chiltern Hundreds, Robert Ward was returned unopposed. "Castlereagh ... was not prepared to come in at that moment, and after an unsuccessful attempt to persuade Savage to reconsider his decision, he arranged for his old friend Colonel Ward to stand as a 'stopgap' until the general election".

=== Elections in the 1800s ===
At the 1806 and 1807 general elections, Francis Savage and John Meade were elected unopposed.

County Down by-election, 1805
Party	Candidate	Votes	%	±%
Nonpartisan	John Meade	1,973	57.1	N/A
Tory	Robert Stewart	c. 1481	42.9	N/A
Majority		492	14.2	N/A
Turnout		3,454		
Nonpartisan gain from Whig		Swing		

At the creation of the Parliament of the United Kingdom in 1801, the sitting members of the Parliament of Ireland for County Down, Francis Savage and Viscount Castlereagh, continued as MPs for the county. At the 1802 general election, Savage and Castlereagh were returned unopposed.
