= James Sharman Crawford =

Irish politician (1812–1878)

James Sharman Crawford (1812 – 28 April 1878) was the member of parliament for County Down, 1874–1878.` He was a son of William Sharman Crawford who had unsuccessfully contested the constituency in 1852. He was also a member of a landed gentry family.

Parliament of the United Kingdom
Preceded by Lord Edwin Hill-Trevor; William Brownlow Forde	Member of Parliament for Down; 1874 – 1878; With: Lord Edwin Hill-Trevor 1874–1878	Succeeded by Lord Edwin Hill-Trevor; Viscount Castlereagh
