= Robert Stewart, Viscount Castlereagh =

British statesman (1769–1822)

The Most Honourable The Marquess of Londonderry KG GCH PC PC (Ire)
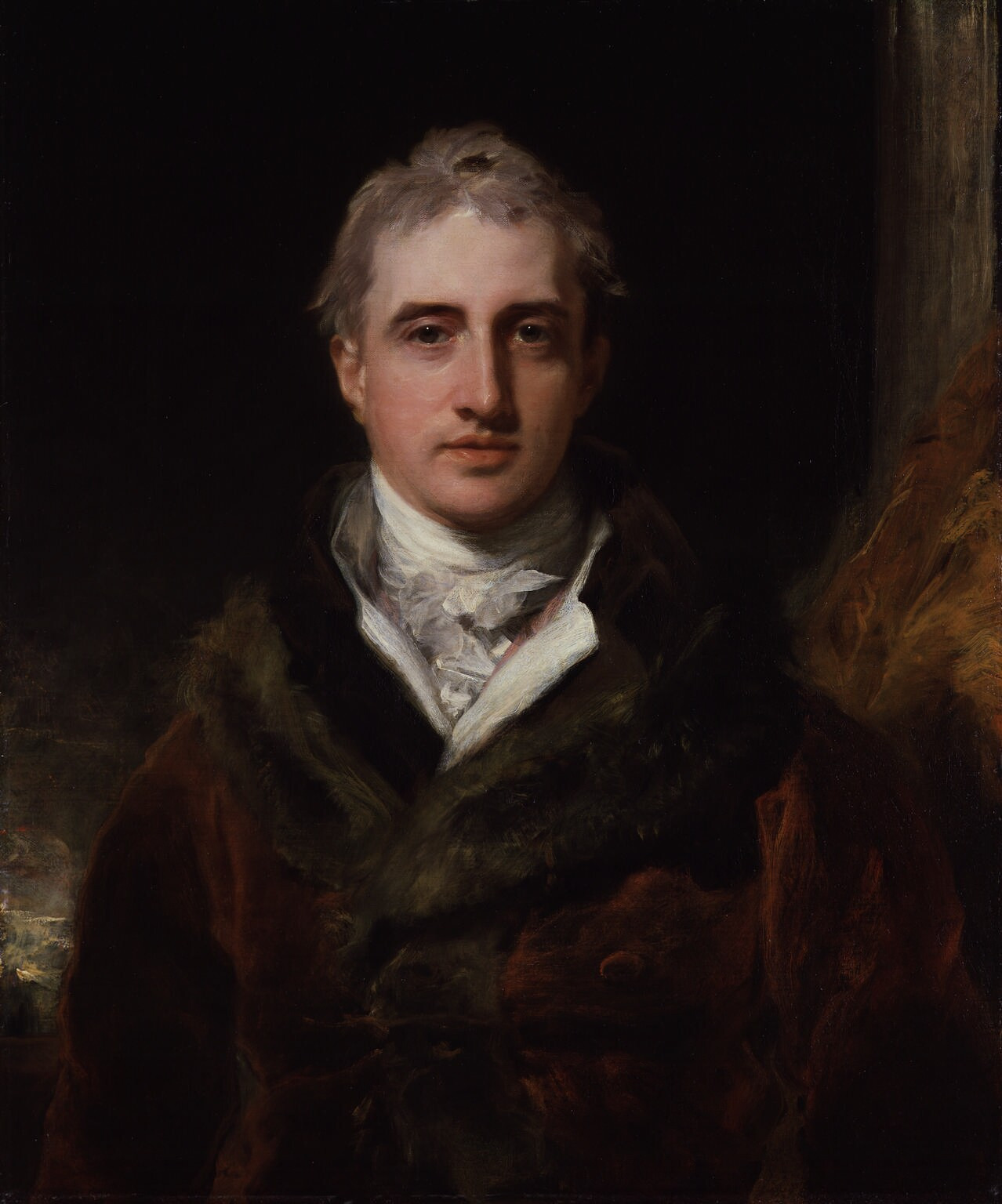
- Portrait of Lord Castlereagh by Sir Thomas Lawrence, c. 1809–1810

Secretary of State for Foreign Affairs
- In office 4 March 1812 – 12 August 1822
- Prime Minister: Spencer Perceval; The Earl of Liverpool
- Preceded by: The Marquess Wellesley
- Succeeded by: George Canning

Leader of the House of Commons
- In office 8 June 1812 – 12 August 1822
- Prime Minister: The Earl of Liverpool
- Preceded by: Spencer Perceval
- Succeeded by: George Canning

Secretary of State for War and the Colonies
- In office 25 March 1807 – 1 November 1809
- Prime Minister: The Duke of Portland
- Preceded by: William Windham
- Succeeded by: The Earl of Liverpool
- In office 10 July 1805 – 5 February 1806
- Prime Minister: William Pitt the Younger
- Preceded by: The Earl Camden
- Succeeded by: William Windham

President of the Board of Control
- In office 2 July 1802 – 11 February 1806
- Prime Minister: Henry Addington; William Pitt the Younger
- Preceded by: The Earl of Dartmouth
- Succeeded by: The Lord Minto

Chief Secretary for Ireland
- In office 14 June 1798 – 27 April 1801
- Prime Minister: William Pitt the Younger
- Lord Lieutenant: The Marquess Cornwallis
- Preceded by: Thomas Pelham
- Succeeded by: Charles Abbot

Personal details
- Born: Robert Stewart; 18 June 1769 Dublin, Ireland
- Died: 12 August 1822 (aged 53) Woollet Hall, Kent, England, United Kingdom of Great Britain and Ireland
- Cause of death: Suicide
- Resting place: Westminster Abbey
- Citizenship: Kingdom of Ireland; United Kingdom
- Party: Whig (1790–1795); Tory (1795–1822)
- Spouse: Lady Amelia Hobart
- Parents: Robert Stewart, 1st Marquess of Londonderry; Lady Sarah Frances Seymour-Conway
- Education: St. John's College, Cambridge
- Nickname: "Bloody Castlereagh"

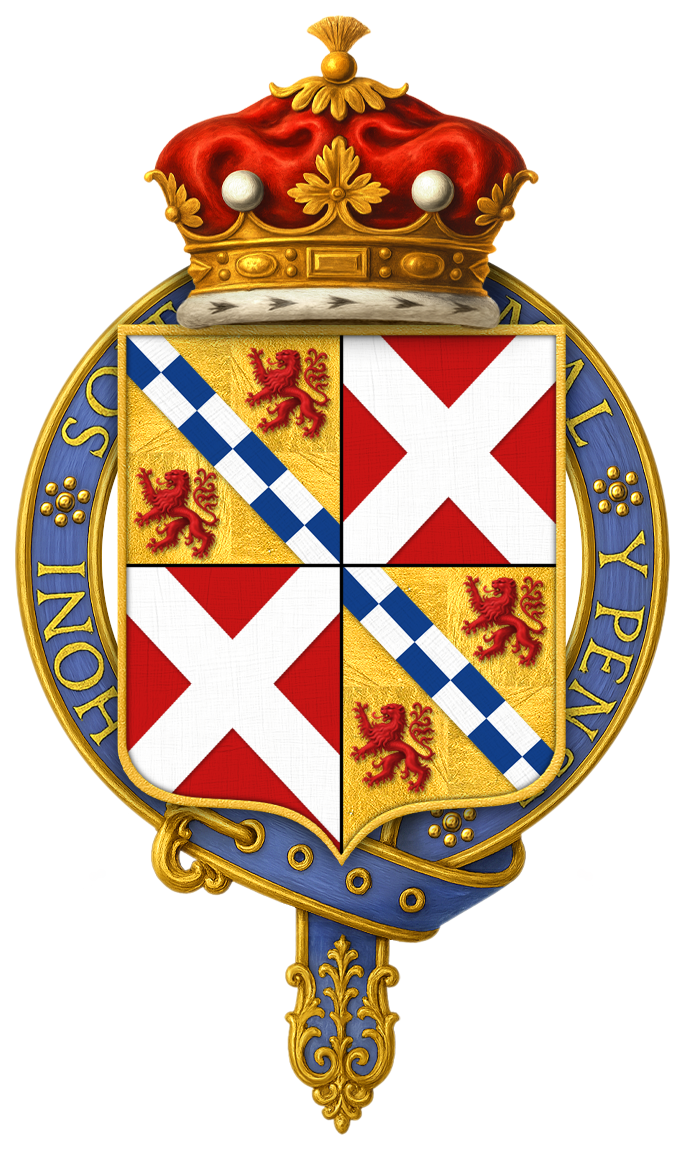
Quartered arms of Robert Stewart, 2nd Marquess of Londonderry, KG, GCH, PC, PC (Ireland)

Robert Stewart, 2nd Marquess of Londonderry (18 June 1769 – 12 August 1822), usually known as Lord Castlereagh, derived from the courtesy title Viscount Castlereagh (Note: The name Castlereagh derives from the barony of Castlereagh in which lie the towns of Newtownards and Comber. The estates included the demesne land of Mount Pleasant, later Mount Stewart, which became the family seat of the Londonderrys (see Leigh, Castlereagh, p. 15).) (UK: /ˈkɑːsəlreɪ/ KAH-səl-ray) by which he was styled from 1796 to 1821, was a British statesman. As secretary to the Viceroy in Ireland, he worked to suppress the Rebellion of 1798 and to secure passage in 1800 of the Irish Act of Union. As the Foreign Secretary of the United Kingdom from 1812, he was central to the management of the coalition that defeated Napoleon, and was British plenipotentiary at the Congress of Vienna. In the post-war government of Lord Liverpool, Castlereagh was seen to support harsh measures against agitation for reform, and he ended his life an isolated and unpopular figure.

Early in his career in Ireland, and following a visit to revolutionary France, Castlereagh recoiled from the democratic politics of his Presbyterian constituents in Ulster. Crossing the floor of the Irish House of Commons in support of the government, he took a leading role in detaining members of the republican conspiracy, the United Irishmen, his former political associates among them. After the 1798 Rebellion, as Chief Secretary for Ireland he pushed the Act of Union through the Irish Parliament. However, unable to overcome the resistance of King George III to the Catholic Emancipation that they believed should have accompanied the creation of a United Kingdom, both he and Prime Minister William Pitt resigned.

From 1805 Castlereagh served as Secretary of State for War in Pitt's second administration and, from 1806, under the Duke of Portland. In 1809 he was obliged to resign after fighting a duel with the foreign secretary, George Canning. In 1812, Castlereagh returned to government serving Lord Liverpool as Foreign Secretary and as Leader of the House of Commons. Castlereagh organised and financed the alliance that defeated Napoleon, bringing the powers together at the Treaty of Chaumont in 1814.

Following Napoleon's second abdication in 1815, Castlereagh worked with the European courts represented at the Congress of Vienna to frame the territorial, and broadly conservative, continental order that was to hold until mid-century. He resisted the imposition of harsh terms on France, believing that they would upset the European balance of power. After 1815, at home, Castlereagh supported repressive measures that linked him in public opinion to the Peterloo Massacre of 1819. Widely reviled in both Ireland and Great Britain, overworked, and personally distressed, Castlereagh died by suicide in 1822.

== Early life and career in Ireland ==
Robert was born on 18 June 1769 in 28 Henry Street, in Dublin's Northside. He was the second and only surviving child of Robert Stewart (the elder) and his wife Sarah Frances Seymour-Conway. His parents married in 1766.

=== The Stewarts ===
The Stewarts had been a Scottish family settled in Donegal whose fortunes had been transformed by the marriage of Castlereagh's grandfather Alexander Stewart to an East India Company heiress. (Note: His father was a nephew of Robert Cowan, a wealthy and successful Governor of Bombay for the British East India Company, whose heir was the elder Stewart's mother, Cowan's sister Mary. Much of the Stewart family wealth was based on the estates which came into the family through the Cowan inheritance, which put the family squarely in the landed gentry class of Ulster Presbyterians whose ancestors first arrived in Ireland during the Plantation of Ulster. (See "The Cowan Inheritance". Public Records Office of Northern Ireland. 7 September 2006. Archived from the original on 14 November 2007.).) The legacy from Robert Cowan, the former Governor of Bombay, allowed for the purchase of extensive properties in north Down including the future family demesne, Mount Stewart, on the shores of Strangford Lough.

As a Presbyterian (a "Dissenter" from established Anglican church), Castlereagh's father, Robert Stewart, had an easy reputation as a friend of reform. In 1771, and again in 1776, he was elected from County Down to the Irish House of Commons. In 1778 he joined the Irish Volunteer movement, raising an armed and drilled company from his estates. In parliament and among the Volunteers, he was a friend and supporter of Lord Charlemont and his policy. This favoured Volunteer agitation for the independence of Ireland's Ascendancy parliament, but not for its reform and not for Catholic emancipation.

The elder Robert Stewart was created Baron Londonderry in 1789, Viscount Castlereagh in 1795, and Earl of Londonderry in 1796 by King George III, enabling him from the Act of Union of 1800 onwards to sit at Westminster in the House of Lords as an Irish representative peer. In 1816 he was elevated to Marquess of Londonderry. At some point, likely in advance of his elevation in 1795 to Viscount, he led his family in taking the established Anglican communion.

Young Robert's mother, Lady Sarah Frances Stewart, died in childbirth when he was a year old. She had been the daughter of Francis Seymour-Conway, 1st Marquess of Hertford, and Isabella Fitzroy, a daughter of Charles FitzRoy, 2nd Duke of Grafton. Lord Hertford was a former British Ambassador to France (1764–1765) and Lord Lieutenant of Ireland (1765–1766).

Five years later his father married Lady Frances Pratt, the independent-minded daughter of Charles Pratt, 1st Earl Camden (1714–1794), a leading English jurist and prominent political supporter of both William Pitt, 1st Earl of Chatham, and his son, William Pitt the Younger. The marriages of the elder Robert Stewart linked his family with the upper ranks of English nobility and political elites. The Camden connection was to be especially important for the political careers of the older and the younger Robert Stewart. By Frances Pratt, his father's second wife, young Robert had eleven half-siblings, including his half-brother Charles Stewart (later Vane), Baron Stewart of Stewart's Court and Ballylawn in County Donegal (1814) and 3rd Marquess of Londonderry (1822).

Family tree

Robert Stewart (Castlereagh) with wife, parents, and other selected relatives. He had no children.

William; Stewart; Colonel	John; Cowan d. 1733
Alexander; 1699–1781	Mary; Cowan d. 1788	Robert; Cowan d. 1737; Bombay; Governor
Sarah; Frances; Seymour; 1747–1770	Robert; 1st Marquess; 1739–1821	Frances; Pratt c. 1751 - 1833
Robert; 2nd Marquess; 1769–1822; Castlereagh	Amelia; Hobart; 1772–1829	Catherine; Bligh d. 1812	Charles; 3rd Marquess; 1778–1854	Frances; Vane; 1800–1865
Frederick; 4th Marquess; 1805–1872	George; 5th Marquess; 1821–1884
Charles; 6th Marquess; 1852–1915	Theresa; Talbot d. 1919

Legend

XXX	Subject of the article	XXX	Robert; Cowan	XXX	Marquesses of Londonderry

=== Education ===
The younger Robert Stewart had recurring health problems throughout his childhood, and was sent to The Royal School, Armagh, rather than to England for his secondary education. At the encouragement of Charles Pratt, 1st Earl Camden, who took a great interest in him and treated him as if he had been a grandson by blood, he later attended St. John's College, Cambridge (1786–1787), where he applied himself with greater diligence than expected from an aristocrat and excelled in his first-year examinations. But he then withdrew, pleading an illness that he admitted to Camden was something "which cannot be directly acknowledged before women", i.e. something sexually transmitted.

=== Irish MP ===
In the summer of 1790, Stewart was elected as a Member of the Irish Parliament for his family's County Down constituency. In a county with an exceptionally large number of enfranchised freeholders, his campaign pitted him in a popular contest against the nominees of the county's established Ascendancy families, (Note: The Down election of 1790 was fought against the elder Stewart's rival for influence in Ulster, Wills Hill, 1st Marquess of Downshire, who controlled both Down seats. The elder Stewart, who had been raised to the Irish peerage the previous year and was thereby ineligible, persuaded his son to stand for the seat. His son was backed, as he had been, by Whigs and Dissenters. The election expenses to the Stewarts reached the extraordinary sum of £60,000, financed by a mortgage of Mount Stewart, which Castlereagh's father spent much of the next decades paying off. (See Leigh, Castlereagh.)) and on that basis alone he won the sympathy and support of Belfast's Northern Whig Club. It had been his conscious strategy to capitalise on strong Volunteer and reform sentiments.

In a letter to the Belfast Newsletter he declared for parliamentary reform (reform that would have abolished the pocket boroughs that allowed Ascendancy families, in addition to their presence in the House of Lords, to control seats in the Commons). In doing so, he won the support of many who, later despairing of parliamentary "patriots", were to enter the ranks of the United Irishmen.

In the House of Commons, Stewart spurned an offer of a place in government and sat as an independent. But otherwise, he made little impression and was judged a poor speaker.

=== Reflections on the Revolution in France ===
In July 1791, having both read Reflections on the Revolution in France by Edmund Burke (a family friend) and learnt that in Belfast Irish Volunteers were preparing to celebrate Bastille Day, Stewart decided to judge events in France for himself.In Spa in the Austrian Netherlands he had difficulty in empathising with the wholly reactionary outlook of the French émigrés. But after passing into France in November, he conceded that while he did not "like" the government of Ireland, "I prefer it to a revolution".

Stewart was not convinced of Burke's contention that the revolution would produce a French Cromwell, although he recognised that outside Paris the principles of liberty were not as entrenched. As the revolutionary factions, the Jacobins and Girondins, struggled for supremacy in the capital, it was "the nation at large" that would "ultimately decide between them."

In "an early example of [his] scepticism about foreign intervention", Stewart argued it was beyond her neighbours to give government to France. The Austrian Emperor might march his troops to Paris, but unless he was prepared to keep them there, the Ancien Régime restored would again collapse.

Stewart returned to the Austrian Netherlands in the autumn of 1792, but was unable to cross the now military frontlines into France. However, news of the Jacobin triumph in Paris, and, following her victory at Valmy, the prospect of France carrying defence of the revolution beyond her frontiers convinced him that "it would not be long before he had to face his own 'Jacobins' in Ireland."

=== Catholic relief, loyalty to Pitt ===
When in 1793 he returned to the parliament in Dublin, Stewart spoke in favour of the Catholic Relief Bill. In doing so he was supporting the policy of British prime minister William Pitt who determined that Catholic opinion be conciliated in preparation for the impending war with the new, anti-clericalist, French Republic. While calling for the removal of their remaining civil disabilities, Stewart stopped short of endorsing extension to Catholics of the right to vote on the same forty-shilling freehold terms as Protestants that was provided in the bill. He also resisted calls to deprive the Ascendancy of their pocket boroughs, the combination of which would ensure that Catholics would form an overwhelming majority of those represented in the Irish Parliament. "Can a Protestant superstructure," he asked, "long continue supported on such base?"

However, his loyalty to Pitt now seemed unconditional. In April 1793, Stewart was gazetted a Lieutenant-Colonel in the government's new Militia, its replacement for the now proscribed Volunteers. He commanded the Londonderry Militia, being promoted to Colonel of the regiment in 1800.

In 1794, partly as a result of the promotion of his interests by his Camden connections, Stewart was offered the Government-controlled seat of Tregony in Cornwall. In 1796, he transferred to a seat for the Suffolk constituency of Orford, which was in the interest of his mother's family, the Seymour-Conways (Marquess of Hertford). He held these seats simultaneously with his county seat in Ireland.

=== Marriage ===
In 1794, Stewart married Lady Amelia (Emily) Hobart, a daughter of John Hobart, 2nd Earl of Buckinghamshire, a former British Ambassador to Russia (1762–1765) and Lord Lieutenant of Ireland (1776–1780). Her mother, Caroline Conolly, was the granddaughter of William Conolly, Speaker of the Irish House of Commons in the early 18th century and one of the wealthiest landowners in Ireland. Caroline's brother, Thomas Conolly, was married to Louisa Lennox, sister of Emily FitzGerald, Duchess of Leinster, whose son and Emily's cousin-by-marriage, Lord Edward FitzGerald, was a leader of the United Irishmen and one of their martyrs in the early stages of the Irish Rebellion of 1798.

Emily Stewart was well known as a hostess for her husband in both Ireland and London and during some of his most important diplomatic missions. In later years she was a leader of Regency London high society as one of the Lady Patronesses of Almack's. She is noted in contemporary accounts for her attractiveness, volubility and eccentricities. By all accounts, the two remained devoted to each other to the end, but they had no children. (Note: In a profile of Castlereagh published within months of his death, he was reported to have had, prior to his marriage, a son by a maidservant who lived near the Mount Stewart estate, and whom it was rumoured he supported. (Felton Reede, Private Life of the Marquess of Londonderry, (1822), cited in Leigh, Castlereagh, pp 34 and 144.)) The couple did, however, care for the young Frederick Stewart, while his father, Stewart's half-brother, Charles, was serving in the army.

== Chief Secretary for Ireland ==
=== Suppression of the United Irishmen ===
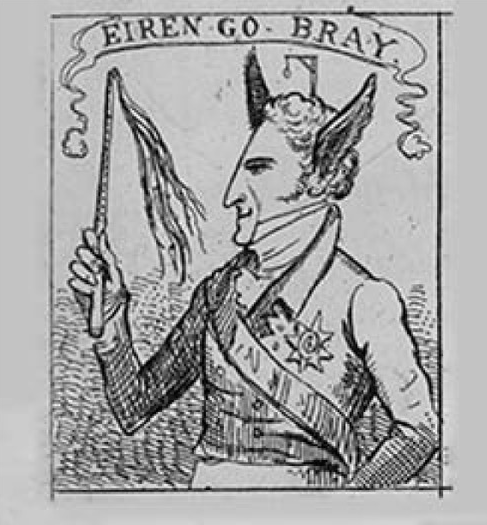
Bloody Castlereagh, 1798

In 1795, Pitt replaced William Fitzwilliam, 4th Earl Fitzwilliam, as Lord Lieutenant of Ireland with Stewart's uncle, John Pratt, 2nd Earl Camden. Fitzwilliam had urged that the emancipation of Catholics be completed with their admission to parliament. Camden's arrival in Dublin was greeted with riots, and that year Stewart crossed the floor of the Irish House of Commons to join the supporters of the government, the Dublin Castle executive. (Note: The war with France absorbed much of the attention of Government and Parliament, and what attention was paid to an increasingly radicalised Ireland was confused and inconsistent. Pitt's dismissal of the popular Lord Fitzwilliam in 1795, over Fitzwilliam's aggressive support of Whig patronage and Catholic emancipation, produced outrage and rioting in Dublin. Castlereagh had watched the unravelling of Irish policy with deep concern and knew what sort of reaction to expect to Fitzwilliam's dismissal. But he was in no position to steer Irish policy nor could he object to the inevitable departure of Fitzwilliam, especially as the person appointed to replace Fitzwilliam was the brother of Stewart's step-mother, John Jeffreys Pratt, who had recently succeeded as 2nd Earl Camden. (See Leigh, Castlereagh, Ch. 3.)) Stewart became an essential adviser to the inexperienced and unpopular Lord Lieutenant, who was Stewart's senior by only ten years. In August 1796, Stewart's father was elevated to the title Earl of Londonderry. As his son, Stewart was henceforth styled Viscount Castlereagh.

In September, acting upon evidence of communication with the French, Castlereagh personally led troops in a series of raids in Belfast and its environs (the "Siege of Belfast") that netted leading members of the United Irishmen. Among them were men who had supported him in the election of 1790. Originating in Belfast among Presbyterian celebrants of the American and French revolutions, the republican conspiracy had spread rapidly in Ulster and, in league with the Catholic Defenders, across the Irish midlands. In County Down, Castlereagh's father had difficulty in raising a loyalist yeomanry among his tenants and eventually, with all rent withheld, Mount Stewart was placed under armed guard. In December 1796, a large French expedition to Ireland failed to land at Bantry Bay due contrary winds. As an officer in the militia, Castlereagh was well apprised of the lack of preparedness to meet a combination of professional French soldiery and the countrywide insurgency it would likely trigger.

In February 1797, Castlereagh was at last appointed to the Dublin Castle administration as Keeper of the King's Signet for Ireland. (Note: Castlereagh had been re-elected without opposition from Down in 1797 and continued to hold this seat while in office in Ireland. He could not continue to hold both Irish office and the seat in Westminster for Orford, which he therefore resigned. (See Leigh, Castlereagh, Ch 4.) In the Irish election of 1798, he stood for Newtown Limavady as well as for Down. He was successful for both constituencies and chose to sit for the latter.) Following a declaration of martial law he was made both a Lord of the Treasury and a Member of the Privy Council of Ireland (1797–1800). (Note: In Council, though he was active in pursuing plots against the Government, he countered the influence of the more extreme members of the Protestant Ascendancy who, against especially the policies of the new Commander-in-Chief for Ireland, Sir Ralph Abercromby, called for indiscriminate violence to suppress all threat of rebellion. (See Leigh, Castlereagh, Ch 4).) At the urging of Camden, Castlereagh assumed many of the onerous duties of the often-absent Chief Secretary for Ireland, who was responsible for day-to-day administration and for asserting the influence of Dublin Castle in the House of Commons. (Note: The Chief Secretary for Ireland from 1795 to 1798 was Thomas Pelham, but he was continually absent from his duties due to illness. Camden pressed London to replace Pelham, recommending in his stead Castlereagh, whose performance in office was admired by those in London concerned with Irish policy. But as an example of the perverse prejudices of the era, Castlereagh, who might have been especially competent in this delicate and demanding office because he was an Irishman, was also ineligible to represent the Crown in Ireland because he was an Irishman, even though this Irishman was grandson of an English Marquess, great-grandson of an English Duke and son-in-law of an English Earl. After pressure by Pitt on George III who shared the prejudice against appointments of Irish as representatives of the Crown in Ireland, Castlereagh was appointed Acting Chief Secretary in March 1798. But it was only in November 1798, after the Rebellion had been put down that, in response to imperious demands from the next influential Lord Lieutenant, Marquess Cornwallis, Castlereagh was given the permanent office, and for the first time the Chief Secretary for Ireland was an Irishman. The next month, Castlereagh was admitted to the King's Privy Council. (See Leigh, Castlereagh Ch 4, and "The London Gazette". (112 KiB) 18 December 1798, p. 1 (1 page pdf).)) In this capacity, and after March 1798 as Acting Chief Secretary, Castlereagh played a key role in crushing the Irish Rebellion of 1798 when it began on May 1798. In November 1798, Castlereagh was formally appointed to the office of Chief Secretary by Camden's successor, Lord Cornwallis.

=== Executions of William Orr and James Porter ===
Castlereagh's general policy was to offer immediate clemency to the rebel rank-and-file, many of whom were then inducted into the yeomanry, while still focusing on the politically committed leadership. But already before the rebellion, he had begun to earn the sobriquet "Bloody Castlereagh".

In October 1797, his stepmother, Lady Frances, had petitioned Camden for the life of William Orr. On a charge of administering the United Irish test to two soldiers, Orr had been named on the same warrant that Castlereagh had used in the roundup of the previous September. The judge reportedly broke down in tears as he read the death sentence which the popular journalist Peter Finnerty credited to Castlereagh's insistence on making an example in the face of the growing "French fever". In 1811, Castlereagh successfully had Finnerty convicted for libel.

After the rebellion, during which Mount Stewart was briefly occupied, Castlereagh was content that leading United Irishmen in the Presbyterian north be allowed American exile. An exception was made in the case of James Porter, executed, again despite the entreaties of Lady Frances, following a court martial before Castlereagh's father, Lord Londonderry. Porter, who had been his family's Presbyterian minister and, in 1790, his election agent, had become a household name in Ulster as the author of a satire of the county gentry, Billy Bluff, in which Londonderry was serially lampooned as an inarticulate tyrant.

=== The Act of Union and the promise of Emancipation ===
In 1799, in furtherance of both his own political vision and Pitt's policies, Castlereagh began lobbying in the Irish and British Parliaments for a union that would incorporate Ireland with Great Britain in a United Kingdom. In addition to security against the French, Castlereagh saw the principal merit of bringing Ireland directly under the Crown in the Westminster Parliament as a resolution of what ultimately was the key issue for the governance of the country, the Catholic question. "Linked with England", he reasoned that "the Protestants, feeling less exposed, would be more confident and liberal", while Catholics, reduced to a minority within the larger kingdom, would lower their expectations and moderate their demands.

During the campaign for the Act of Union, both Castlereagh and Cornwallis had, in good faith, forwarded informal assurances they had received from Pitt's Cabinet to the Irish Catholics that they would be allowed to sit in the new United Kingdom Parliament. However, opposition in England, and not least from the King, George III, obliged Castlereagh to defy what he saw as "the very logic of the Union." The Union bill that, with a generous distribution of titles and favours, he helped put through the Irish Parliament omitted the provision for Catholic emancipation. A separate Irish executive in Dublin was retained, but representation, still wholly Protestant, was transferred to Westminster constituted as the Parliament of the United Kingdom of Great Britain and Ireland.

Pitt had tried to follow through on his commitment, but when it came to light that the King had approached Henry Addington, an opponent of Catholic emancipation, about becoming prime minister to replace him, both Castlereagh and Pitt resigned. Castlereagh would long be held personally responsible by many Catholics in Ireland for the breach of promise and the British Government's failure to remove their remaining political disabilities.

== President of the Board of Control ==
=== Wellesley and India ===
In the new Parliament of the United Kingdom the tensions within the ruling Tories over Catholic emancipation abated, and after obtaining his desired cessation of hostilities with France (the Peace of Amiens), in July 1802 Henry Addington brought Castlereagh into the Cabinet as President of the Board of Control. His chief task was to mediate the bitter disputes between the Governor-General of India, Richard Wellesley (the brother of Arthur Wellesley), and the Directors of the East India Company, smoothing quarrels while generally supporting Lord Wellesley's policies. In 1805, with the renewed struggle against Napoleon in Europe the overriding priority, he presided over Wellesley's recall and replacement by Lord Cornwallis, and over the subsequent abandonment of most of Wellesley's recent acquisitions in central India.

=== Irish interventions ===
While his British interests and responsibilities took up more and more of his time, and his visits home became increasingly brief and rare, Castlereagh still hoped to do something for Ireland from the government benches. On entering the cabinet he wrote to Addington deploring the role of the Orange Order in fostering sectarian violence and to commend putting "the law rigidly in force against all parties" so that in future wars, "our foreign enemies" would not again find an aggrieved domestic ally. More than this, he won cabinet approval for schemes to ensure that the Established Church was not alone in preaching loyalty to the Crown.

To counter, in his words, "the democratic party in the [Presbyterian] synod, most of whom, if not engaged in the Rebellion, were deeply infected with its principles", he proposed transforming the existing Regium Donum, which the Presbyterian body had apportioned equally among its clergy, into a discretionary grant for which each minister had to apply individually with proofs and professions of loyalty. His efforts to extend a similar scheme to the Catholic clergy met with stiffer resistance: priests would not accept support from the Crown while it continued to deny their communicants political equality.

=== Loss and recovery of his home constituency ===
In Ireland, the Anglo-Irish Ascendancy was slow to forgive Castlereagh for the loss of their parliament. The Dowager Marchioness of Downshire broke her family's electoral truce with the Stewarts in County Down and in July 1805 forced Castlereagh to defend his (now Westminster) parliamentary seat. In the contest he also faced the hostility of unrepentant United Irishmen—men like William Drennan who were to engage in what Castlereagh denounced as "a deep laid scheme again to bring the Presbyterian Synod within the ranks of democracy". (In 1810, with Castlereagh out of office, Drennan and his friends secured a government grant for the education of Presbyterian ministers in their new, distinctly liberal, Belfast Academical Institution).

Despite the prestige of a new cabinet position in London, Castlereagh was defeated in a campaign marked by repeated aspersions on his failure to father a child, and by the taunts of those who, otherwise no friends of the Downshires, reminded him of the principles on which he had stood in 1790. News of his discomfiture was met with public celebration in Dublin and Belfast.

On his return to London, the Treasury found him an alternative English seat, Boroughbridge, a government-controlled rotten borough. Having conciliated the Downshires and able to ride the victories of Arthur Wellesley (future Duke of Wellington), the reputed Dubliner he had appointed to command in the Peninsular War, in 1812 Castlereagh avenged his humiliation, and recovered the family seat.

== Secretary for War ==
=== Hanover, Copenhagen, and Walcheren ===
After the renewal of the war against Napoleon, at the urging of Castlereagh and other long-time supporters in 1804 Pitt returned as prime minister. Castlereagh entered the new cabinet as Secretary of State for War and the Colonies.

While pushing forward reforms of the military, he joined Pitt in endorsing an aggressive expeditionary policy. In October 1805, an army under General Sir George Don was landed at the mouth of the Elbe with a view to liberating Hanover. Following Napoleon's triumph over the Russian and Austrian armies at Austerlitz in December, it had to be recalled at great cost.

As the only other member of Pitt's cabinet in the House of Commons, Castlereagh became Pitt's political deputy, taking on ever more burdens as Pitt's health continued to decline. After Pitt's death in 1806, Castlereagh resigned amid the chaos of the Ministry of All the Talents. When that Government collapsed, Castlereagh again became Secretary of State for War and the Colonies in 1807, this time in the ministry of the Duke of Portland.

In August 1807, he concurred with Foreign Secretary George Canning in authorising a British bombardment of the neutral Danish capital, Copenhagen. They sought to pre-emptively capture or destroy the Dano-Norwegian fleet fearing that it would fall into French hands. The incident precipitated both the Anglo-Russian War of 1807 and Denmark's adherence to the Continental System and alliance with France.

In 1808 Castlereagh had been warned by Dumouriez that the best policy England could adopt with respect to colonies in Spanish America was to relinquish all ideas of military conquest by Arthur Wellesley and instead support the emancipation of the territories. Furthermore, Dumouriez suggested that once emancipation was achieved, a constitutional monarchy should be established with the exiled Duke of Orleans as King.

In 1809, with the Dowager Marchioness of Downshire now manoeuvring against him in London, the debacle of the Walcheren Expedition subjected Castlereagh to particularly hostile scrutiny.

=== Duel with Canning ===
Canning claimed to have opposed the Walcheren Expedition, to have dismissed the landing on the Dutch coast as an ill-advised, ill-prepared diversion of troops from the Peninsular War. Castlereagh had the support of General Wellesley, and evidence later surfaced that the Foreign Secretary himself had interfered with the plan, selecting the Earl of Chatham to command the expedition. The Portland government became increasingly paralysed by disputes between the two men. Portland was in deteriorating health and gave no lead, until Canning threatened resignation unless Castlereagh was removed. When Castlereagh discovered Canning's terms had been accepted, he challenged the Foreign Secretary to a duel.

The duel was fought on 21 September 1809 on Putney Heath. Canning missed but Castlereagh wounded his opponent in the thigh. There was much outrage that two cabinet ministers had sought to settle their differences in such a manner, and they both felt compelled to resign. Six months later, Canning published a full account of his actions in the affair, but many who had initially rallied to him became convinced Castlereagh had been betrayed by his cabinet colleague.

Canning would later replace Castlereagh as foreign secretary after Castlereagh's death in 1822. Despite their differences and acrimony, Canning largely followed the example, pro-trade philosophy and anti-interventionist playbook Castlereagh had established for British foreign policy – both men successfully serving as stabilizing forces throughout Europe. Castlereagh was perhaps a less committed abolitionist, and historians also question whether, had he continued as Foreign Secretary, Castlereagh would have sided with the liberals in the Spanish revolution of 1820, or have broken with Spain in recognising the new South American republics.

== Foreign Secretary ==
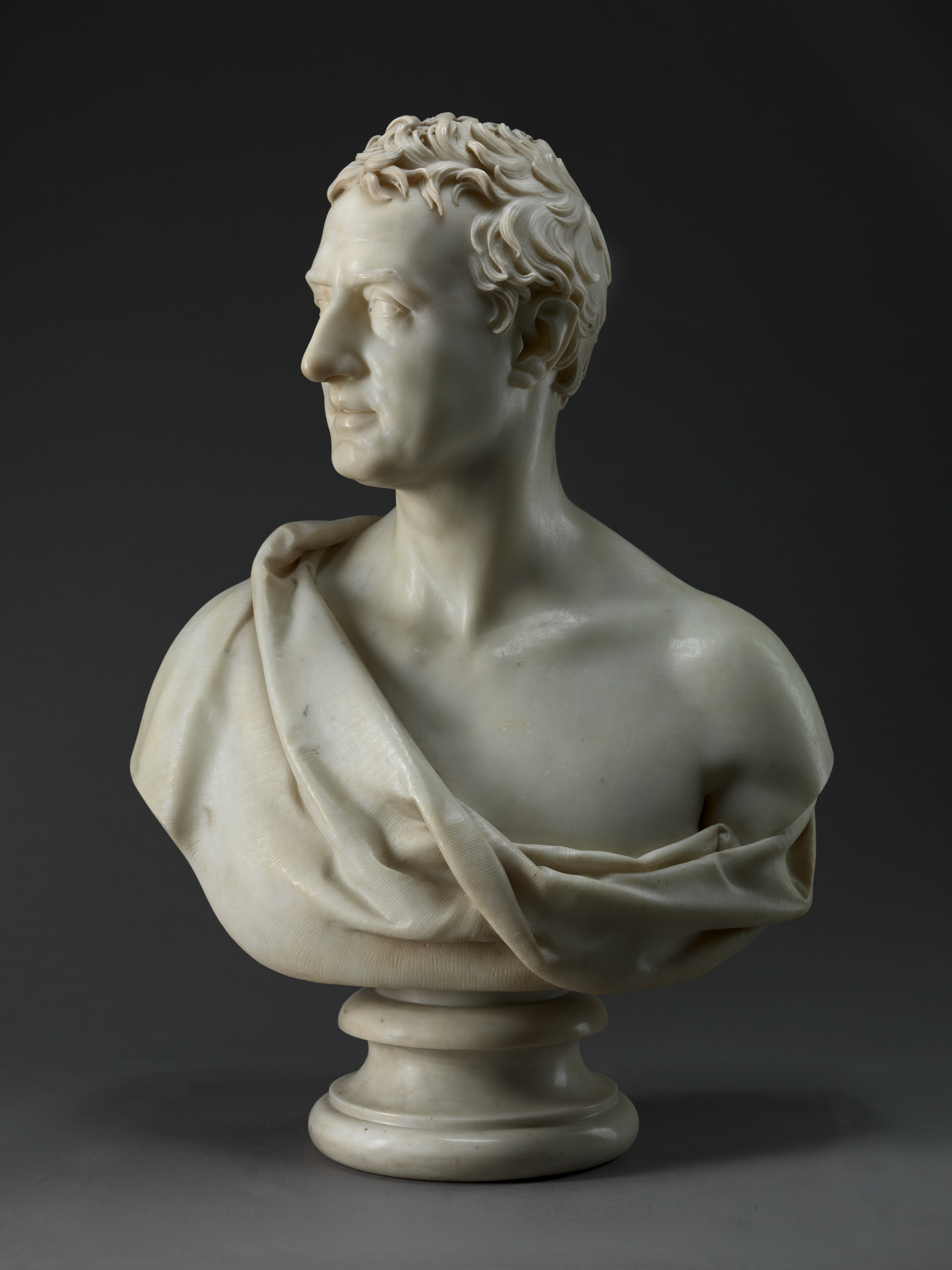
Lord Castlereagh; marble bust by Francis Leggatt Chantrey, 1821; Yale Center for British Art

It was as foreign secretary, that, three years after the duelling scandal, Castlereagh returned to the government in 1812, a role in which he served for the next ten years. In the wake of Spencer Perceval's assassination in 1812, he also became leader of the House of Commons.

=== Treaty of Chaumont ===
As foreign secretary, he was instrumental in negotiating what has become known as the quadruple alliance between Britain, Austria, Russia, and Prussia at Chaumont in March 1814, in the negotiation of the Treaty of Paris that brought peace with France, and at the Congress of Vienna. The Treaty of Chaumont was part of the final deal offered to Napoleon Bonaparte in 1814. Napoleon rejected it and it never took effect. However, the key terms reaffirmed decisions that had been made already. These decisions were again ratified and put into effect by the Congress of Vienna of 1814–1815. The terms were largely written by Lord Castlereagh, who offered cash subsidies to keep the other armies in the field against Napoleon. Key terms included the establishment of a confederated Germany, the division of Italy into independent states, the restoration of the Bourbon kings of Spain, and the enlargement of the Netherlands to include what in 1830 would become modern Belgium. The treaty of Chaumont became the cornerstone of the European Alliance which formed the balance of power for decades.

Historian G. M. Trevelyan argues:

In 1813 and 1814 Castlereagh played the part that William III and Marlborough had played more than a hundred years before, in holding together an alliance of jealous, selfish, weak-kneed states and princes, by a vigour of character and singleness of purpose that held Metternich, the Czar, and the King of Prussia on the common track until the goal was reached. It is quite possible that, but for the lead taken by Castlereagh in the allied counsels, France would never have been reduced to her ancient limits, nor Napoleon dethroned.

=== Congress of Vienna ===
At the Congress of Vienna, Castlereagh designed and proposed a form of collective and collaborative security for Europe, then called a Congress system. In the Congress system, the main signatory powers met periodically (every two years or so) and collectively managed European affairs. This system was used in an attempt to address the Polish-Saxon crisis at Vienna and the question of Greek independence at Laibach. The following ten years saw five European Congresses where disputes were resolved with a diminishing degree of effectiveness. Finally, by 1822, the whole system had collapsed because of the irreconcilable differences of opinion between Britain, Austria, and Russia, and because of the lack of support for the Congress system in British public opinion.

In the years 1812 to 1822, Castlereagh continued to manage Britain's foreign policy, generally pursuing a policy of continental engagement uncharacteristic of British foreign policy in the nineteenth century. Castlereagh was not an effective public speaker and his diplomatic presentation style was at times abstruse.

=== Abolition of the slave trade ===
Abolitionist opinion in Britain was strong enough in 1807 to abolish the slave trade in all British possessions—although slavery itself persisted in the colonies until 1833. Abolitionists after 1807 focused on international agreements to abolish the Atlantic slave trade. In 1806, Castlereagh had opposed Wilberforce's abolition bills arguing that the slave trade could not be suppressed by Britain alone, but only by broad international agreement. This, as foreign minister, he pursued. He concluded treaties with Portugal, Sweden and Denmark, 1810–1814, whereby they agreed to restrict their trading. These were preliminary to the Congress of Vienna the Final Act of which included a declaration condemning the slave trade. Wilberforce, himself, allowed that Castlereagh had secured all that "could be done".

Castlereagh cooperated with senior officials to use the Royal Navy to detect and capture slave ships; the freed slaves were sent to freedom in a new British colony of Sierra Leone. He used diplomacy to conclude search-and-seize agreements with all the countries whose ships were trading. There was serious friction with the United States, where the southern slave interest was politically powerful. Washington recoiled at British policing of the high seas. Spain, France and Portugal also relied on the international slave trade to supply their colonial plantations. As more and more diplomatic arrangements were made by Castlereagh, the owners of slave ships started flying false flags of nations that had not agreed, especially the United States. It was illegal under American law for American ships to engage in the slave trade, but the idea of Britain enforcing American laws was unacceptable to Washington. Lord Palmerston continued the Castlereagh policies. Eventually, from 1842 to 1845, an arrangement was reached between London and Washington. With the arrival of a staunchly anti-slavery government in Washington in 1861, the Atlantic slave trade was doomed. In the long run, Castlereagh's strategy on how to stifle the trade proved successful.

=== Nonintervention in European affairs ===
In May 1820, Castlereagh circulated to high officials a major state paper that set the main British policy for the rest of the century. Temperley and Penson call it, "the most famous State Paper in British history and the one of the widest ultimate consequences." Castlereagh called for no British intervention in continental affairs. He argued that the purpose of the Quadruple Alliance was to contain France and put down revolutions. But the Spanish revolt did not threaten European peace nor any of the great powers. Castlereagh said that in actual practice the powers would seldom be able to agree on concerted action, and he pointed out that British public opinion would not support interventions. He admitted that individual states could indeed intervene in affairs in their recognized sphere of interest, such as Austria's intervention in Italy.

== Lampooning by Thomas Moore ==
As a press, or squib, writer for the Whigs, Thomas Moore, better remembered as Ireland's national bard, mercilessly lampooned Castlereagh. In what were the "verbal equivalents of the political cartoons of the day", Tom Crib's Memorial to Congress (1818), To the Ship in Which Lord Castlereagh Sailed to the Continent (1818) and Fables for the Holy Alliance (1823), Moore savages Castlereagh's pirouetting with Britain's reactionary continental allies. At the Congress, the Foreign Secretary had "showed his phiz--/To sign away the Rights of Man/ To Russian threats and Austrian juggle;/ And leave the sinking African/ To fall without one saving struggle--".

Widely read, so that Moore eventually produced a sequel, was his verse novel The Fudge Family in Paris (1818). The family of an Irishman working as a propagandist for Castlereagh in Paris, the Fudges are accompanied by an accomplished tutor and classicist, Phelim Connor. An upright but disillusioned Irish Catholic, his letters to a friend reflect Moore's own views. Connor's regular epistolary denunciations of Castlereagh had two recurrent themes. First is Castlereagh as "the embodiment of the sickness with which Ireland had infected British politics as a consequence of the union": "We sent thee Castlereagh—as heaps of dead Have slain their slayers by the pest they spread". The second is that at the time of the Acts of Union Castlereagh's support for Catholic emancipation had been disingenuous. Castlereagh had been master of "that faithless craft" which can "cart the slave, can swear he shall be freed", but then "basely spurns him" when his "point is gain'd."

This imputation that he had betrayed his country, bloodied his hands in 1798, and deliberately deceived Catholics at the time of the Union all reportedly wounded Castlereagh. Moore learnt from a mutual connection that Castlereagh had said that "the humorous and laughing things he did not at all mind, but the verses of the Tutor in the Fudge Family were quite another sort of thing, and were in very bad taste indeed." For openly casting the same aspersions against the former Chief Secretary, in 1811 the London-based Irish publisher and former United Irishman, Peter Finnerty, was sentenced to eighteen months for libel.

== Decline and death ==
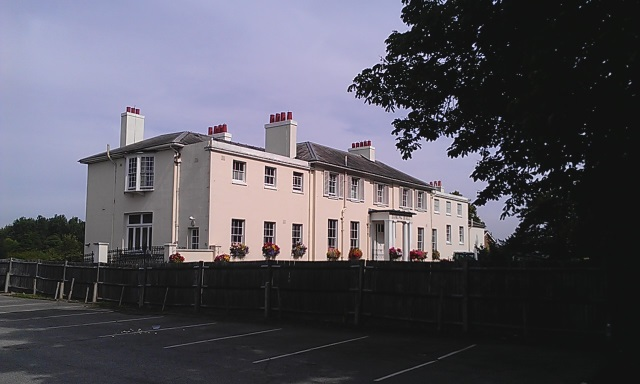
Castlereagh's house, Woollet Hall (now called Loring Hall), in North Cray in Bexley, south London

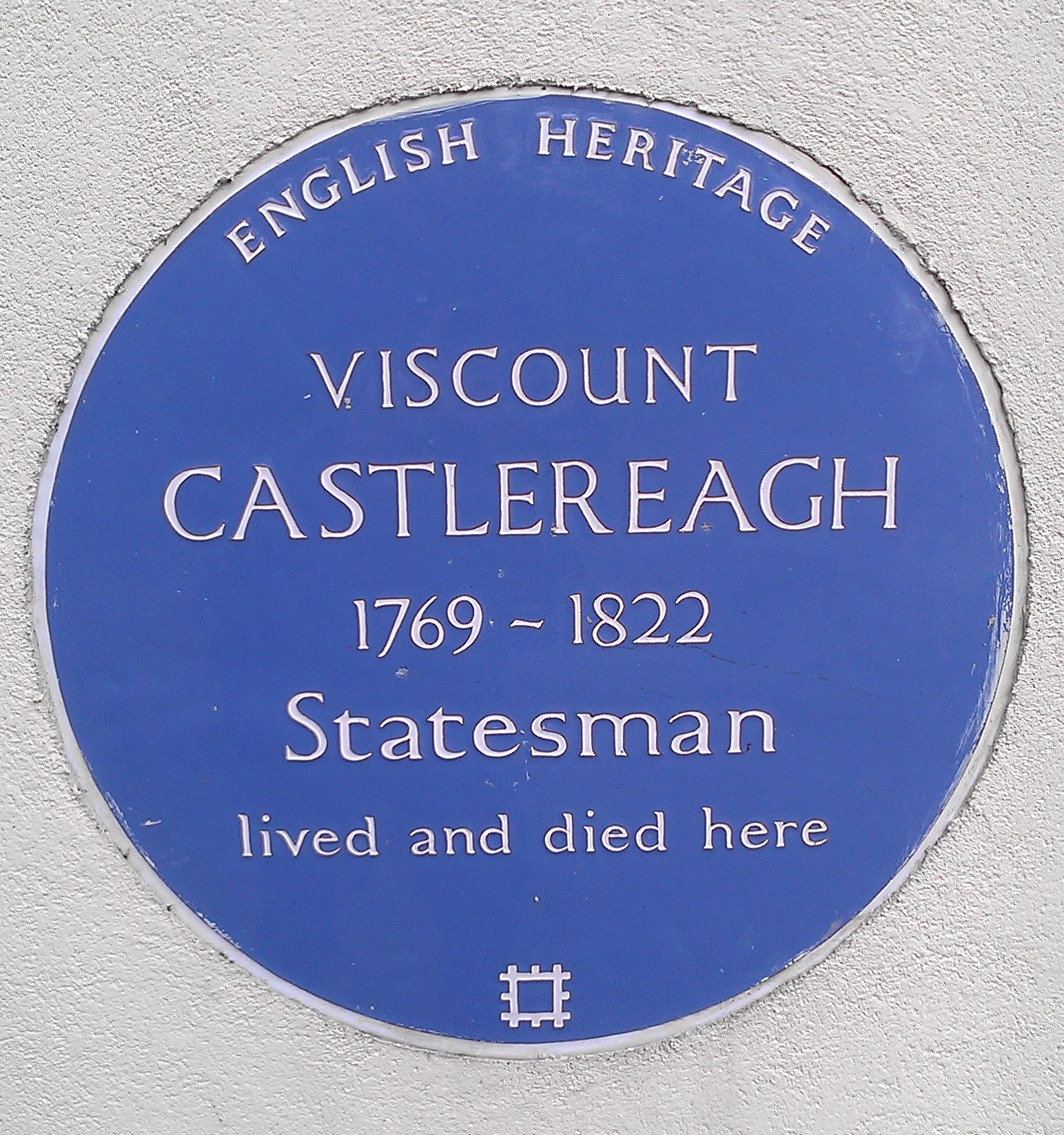
Blue plaque along the North Cray Road

Despite his contributions to the defeat of Napoleon and the restoration of peace, Castlereagh became extremely unpopular at home. He was attacked in the House of Commons by the Opposition for his support of repressive European governments, while the public resented his role in handling the Commons side of the divorce of George IV and Queen Caroline. He was also condemned for his association with repressive measures of the Home Secretary, Lord Sidmouth (the former prime minister Addington). As Leader of the House of Commons for the Liverpool Government, he was often called upon to defend government policy in the House. He had to support the widely reviled measures taken by Sidmouth and the others, including the infamous Six Acts, to remain in cabinet and continue his diplomatic work. For these reasons, Castlereagh appears with other members of Lord Liverpool's Cabinet in Shelley's poem The Masque of Anarchy, which was inspired by, and heavily critical of, the Peterloo Massacre:

I met Murder on the way –
He had a mask like Castlereagh –
Very smooth he looked, yet grim;
Seven bloodhounds followed him.

All were fat; and well they might
Be in admirable plight,
For one by one, and two by two,
He tossed them human hearts to chew
Which from his wide cloak he drew.

After the death of his father in April 1821, which "greatly afflicted him", Castlereagh became the 2nd Marquess of Londonderry. Although ineligible to continue sitting for an Irish constituency, as a non-representative Irish peer he was eligible to sit in the House of Commons for an English seat. Preparations had already been made, and he was able to vacate Down and swiftly win a by-election for his uncle Lord Hertford's borough of Orford of which he had been an MP between 1796 and 1797. He also stood in good favour with the new King, George IV, who openly proposed to dismiss Lord Liverpool and appoint Castlereagh in his stead. Castlereagh's relations with his colleagues, however, were beginning to break down, possibly under the influence of paranoia. In March 1821, he told his brother he lacked able support on the government benches, and that his parliamentary labours were 'difficult to endure'.

By 1822, he was showing clear signs of a form of paranoia or a nervous breakdown. He was severely overworked with both his responsibilities in leading the government in the House and the never-ending diplomacy required to manage conflicts among the other major powers. His oratory in the House had never been of the highest calibre, but now he was considered to be practically incoherent. He spoke of resigning his office if matters did not improve.

Castlereagh began confessing to what was at the time criminal activity. He had already told his friend Mrs. Arbuthnot that he was being blackmailed for an alleged homosexual offence; at a 9 August meeting with the King, Castlereagh appeared distracted, said he was being mysteriously watched by a servant, and that he had committed all manner of crimes, remarking finally, "I am accused of the same crime as the Bishop of Clogher." Percy Jocelyn, who had been the Bishop of Clogher until the previous month, was prosecuted for homosexuality. The King concluded he was unwell and urged him to rest.

The King then sent a message to Lord Liverpool warning him of Castlereagh's illness; Liverpool initially failed to take the matter seriously and dismissed the message. Later that day, however, Castlereagh met with the Duke of Wellington, his cabinet colleague. Castlereagh behaved much as he had with the King; Wellington bluntly told Castlereagh he was not in his right mind, advised him to see a doctor, and alerted Castlereagh's personal physician Charles Bankhead, as well as Castlereagh's friends the Arbuthnots. On the advice of Bankhead, Castlereagh went to his country seat at Woollet Hall in Water Lane, North Cray, Kent, for a weekend stay. He continued to be distressed, and to the concern of his friends and family, ranted wildly about conspiracies and threats to his life. No special watch was kept on him, though his wife saw to it that his pistols and razors were locked away.

Lady Castlereagh wrote to the King informing him that her husband would be unable to continue with official business. The King responded with a note to Castlereagh that his minister did not live to read: "Remember of what importance Your Health is to the Country but above all things to Me".

At about 7:30 am on the morning of 12 August 1822, he sent for Bankhead, who found him in a dressing room seconds after he had cut his own throat, using a small knife which had been overlooked. He collapsed when Bankhead entered, and died almost instantly.

Retrospective speculative diagnoses vary. At the time, his brother blamed "the intrigues that were carried on by the women surrounding the king" (the king's mistress, Lady Conyngham, was not on good terms with Castlereagh's wife). George Agar Ellis, on the other hand, concluded Castlereagh was disillusioned by "the nothingness of human grandeurs ... the sad effects which disappointment and chagrin may have on a mind in which religion is not uppermost, for I have no doubt that the sad and apparently irretrievable state of affairs in England was the real cause of ... [his] unfortunate state of mind." Later verdicts attribute the problem to overwork and mental stress, or to "a psychotic depressive illness". Other theories link various instances of (at the time) little explained illness to syphilis.

== Reaction to his death ==
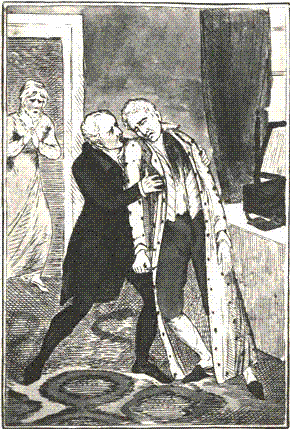
The suicide of Lord Castlereagh by George Cruikshank, 1822

An inquest concluded that the act had been committed while insane, avoiding the harsh strictures of a felo de se verdict. (Note: Suicide was illegal in England until the passing of the Suicide Act 1961. Prior to the Right to Burial Act 1823, a suicide was denied a Christian burial and, until the Abolition of Forfeiture Act 1870, his property was forfeited to the Crown. These cruel penalties were less and less frequently applied over the course of the 18th century, especially in the case of wealthier perpetrators. Inquests were likely to view suicide as itself evidence of the disturbed state of the perpetrator's mind. (See e.g., Clifton D. Bryant, Handbook of Death and Dying, Sage Publications (2003) pp. 316–317.)) The verdict allowed Lady Londonderry to see her husband buried with honour in Westminster Abbey near his mentor, William Pitt. The pallbearers included the Prime Minister Lord Liverpool, the former prime minister Lord Sidmouth and two future Prime Ministers, the Duke of Wellington and Frederick Robinson. Some radicals, notably William Cobbett, claimed a "cover-up" within the government and viewed the verdict and Castlereagh's public funeral as a damning indictment of the elitism and privilege of the unreformed electoral system. At his funeral on 20 August, the crowds which lined the funeral route were generally respectful and decorous, but some jeering and insults were heard (although not to the level of unanimity projected in the radical press); and there was cheering when the coffin was taken out of the hearse at the Abbey door. A funeral monument was not erected until 1850 when his half-brother and successor, Charles Stewart Vane, 3rd Marquess of Londonderry did so.

Some time after Castlereagh's death, Lord Byron wrote a quip about his grave:

Posterity will ne'er survey
A nobler grave than this:
Here lie the bones of Castlereagh:
Stop, traveller, and piss.

Some of his opponents were damning in their verdicts. Thomas Creevy defied "any human being to discover a single feature of his character that can stand a moment's criticism. By experience, good manners and great courage, he managed a corrupt House of Commons pretty well, with some address. This is the whole of his intellectual merit. He had a limited understanding and no knowledge, and his whole life was spent in an avowed, cold-blooded contempt of every honest public principle." Sir Robert Wilson believed that there had never been "a greater enemy to civil liberty or a baser slave."

Others of Castlereagh's political opponents were more gracious in their epigrams. Henry Brougham, a Whig politician and later the Lord Chancellor, who had battled frequently with Castlereagh, once almost to the point of calling him out, and had denigrated his skills as Leader, wrote in the week following Castlereagh's death:

Put all their other men together in one scale, and poor Castlereagh in the other – single he plainly weighed them down ... One can't help feeling a little for him, after being pitted against him for several years, pretty regularly. It is like losing a connection suddenly. Also he was a gentleman, and the only one amongst them.

Modern historians stress the success of Castlereagh's career in spite of the hatred and ignominy he suffered. Trevelyan contrasts his positive achievements and his pitiful failures. His diplomacy was applauded by historians. For example, in 1919 diplomatic historians recommended his wise policies of 1814–1815 to the British delegation to the Paris peace conferences that ended the First World War. Historian R. J. White underscores the paradox:

There probably never was a statesman whose ideas were so right and whose attitude to public opinion was so wrong. Such disparity between the grasp of ends and the understanding of means amounts to a failure in statesmanship.

His biographer John Bew writes:

No British statesman of the 19th century reached the same level of international influence....But very few have been so maligned by their own countrymen and so abused in history. This shy and handsome Ulsterman is perhaps the most hated domestic political figure in both modern British and Irish political history.

== Styles ==
Robert Stewart acquired the courtesy title Viscount Castlereagh in 1796 when his father was created Earl of Londonderry in the Irish peerage. Upon his father's death in 1821, he succeeded as 2nd Marquess of Londonderry, a title to which his father had been raised in 1816. His younger half-brother, the soldier, politician and diplomat Charles Stewart (later Vane) succeeded him as 3rd Marquess of Londonderry in 1822.

He was styled through his life as follows:

- Robert Stewart, Esquire (1769–1789)
- The Honourable Robert Stewart (1789–1796)
- Robert Stewart, Viscount Castlereagh (1796–1797)
- The Right Honourable Viscount Castlereagh (1797–1814)
- The Right Honourable Viscount Castlereagh, KG (1814–1821)
- The Most Honourable The Marquess of Londonderry, KG, GCH, PC, PC (Ire) (1821–1822)

== Memorials and tributes ==
- Castlereagh Street in Sydney was named after him in 1810 by Governor Macquarie.
- The Sydney suburb locality of Castlereagh was also named after him by Macquarie in 1810.
- The Castlereagh River in north-western New South Wales was dedicated to him in 1818 by George Evans and explored by John Oxley.
- The New South Wales electoral seat of Castlereagh also carried his name from 1904 until 1991.

== See also ==
- Lord Castlereagh (ship), two ships named for Lord Castlereagh

== Notes and references ==
=== General and cited sources ===
- Anonymous (1846). The Parliamentary Gazetteer of Ireland. Vol. 1. Dublin: A. Fullarton. – A to C (for hamlet of Castlereagh)
- Artz, Frederick Binkerd (1934). Reaction and Revolution 1814–1832. New York: Harper & Row. OCLC 883674335.
- Bartlett, Christopher John (1966). Castlereagh. London: Macmillan.
- Bew, John (2012) [2011]. Castlereagh: A Life. Oxford: Oxford University Press. ISBN 978-0-19-993159-0.
- Burke, Bernard (1869). A Genealogical and Heraldic Dictionary of the Peerage and Baronetage of the British Empire (31st ed.). London: Harrison.
- Chester, Joseph Lemuel (1876). Registers of Westminster Abbey. London: Private Edition. OCLC 1140248. – Marriages, baptisms and burials from about 1660 to 1875
- Cokayne, George Edward (1893). Complete peerage of England, Scotland, Ireland, Great Britain and the United Kingdom, extant, extinct, or dormant. Vol. V (1st ed.). London: George Bell and Sons. OCLC 1180836840. – L to M (for Londonderry)
- Debrett, John (1828). Peerage of the United Kingdom of Great Britain and Ireland. Vol. II (17th ed.). London: F. C. and J. Rivington. OCLC 54499602. – Scotland and Ireland
- Escott, Thomas Hay Sweet (1914). Club Makers and Club Members. London: T Fisher Unwin. OCLC 2674230.
- Fremont-Barnes, Gregory; Fisher, Todd (2004). The Napoleonic Wars: The Rise and Fall of an Empire. Osprey Publishing. pp. 302–305. ISBN 978-1841768311.
- Fryde, Edmund Boleslaw; Greenway, D. E.; Porter, S.; Roy, I., eds. (1986). Handbook of British Chronology. Royal Historical Society Guides and Handbooks, No. 2 (3rd ed.). London: Offices of the Royal Historical Society. ISBN 0-86193-106-8. – (for timeline)
- Gates, Barbara T. (2014) [1988]. Victorian Suicide: Mad Crimes and Sad Histories. Princeton, New Jersey: Princeton University Press. ISBN 978-0-691-09437-3.
- House of Commons (1878). Return. Members of Parliament – Part II. Parliaments of Great Britain, 1705–1796. Parliaments of the United Kingdom, 1801–1874. Parliaments and Conventions of the Estates of Scotland, 1357–1707. Parliaments of Ireland, 1599–1800. London: His/Her Majesty's Stationery Office. OCLC 13112546.
- Hunt, Giles (2008). The Duel: Castlereagh, Canning and deadly cabinet rivalry. London: I. B. Tauris. ISBN 978-1-84511-593-7.
- Kissinger, Henry (1964). A World Restored. New York: Grosset & Dunlap. OCLC 1203400715.
- Leigh, Ione (1951). Castlereagh. London: Collins. OCLC 1888055. – (especially for early years, access to family papers)
- Shelley, Percy Bysshe (1832). The Mask of Anarchy. London: Edward Moxon. OCLC 21441655.
- Trevelyan, George Macaulay (1922). British History in the Nineteenth Century (1782–1901). London: Longmans, Green & Co. OCLC 1041642436.
- White, R. J. (1956). "Castlereagh". History Today. Vol. 6, no. 5. pp. 326–333.
- Wills, Rev. James (1817). "Robert Marquis of Londonderry". Lives of Illustrious and Distinguished Irishmen, from the earliest times to the present period. Vol. VI. Dublin: A Fullarton & Co. pp. 125–131.

Parliament of Ireland
Preceded by The Earl of Hillsborough; Hon. Edward Ward	Member of Parliament for County Down; 1790–1801; With: The Earl of Hillsborough 1790–1793; Francis Savage 1794–1801	Parliament of the United Kingdom
Preceded by Hugh Carncross; Hon. Richard Trench	Member of Parliament for Newtown Limavady; 1798; With: Hugh Carncross	Succeeded by John Maxwell; Eyre Power Trench
Parliament of Great Britain
Preceded by John Stephenson; Matthew Montagu	Member of Parliament for Tregony; 1794–1796; With: Matthew Montagu	Succeeded by Lionel Copley; John Nicholls
Preceded by William Seymour-Conway; Robert Seymour-Conway	Member of Parliament for Orford; 1796–1797; With: Robert Seymour-Conway	Succeeded by Robert Seymour-Conway; The Earl of Yarmouth
Parliament of the United Kingdom
New constituency	Member of Parliament for Down; 1801–1805; With: Francis Savage	Succeeded by Francis Savage; John Meade
Preceded by John Scott; Edward Berkeley Portman	Member of Parliament for Boroughbridge; January–November 1806; With: Edward Berkeley Portman	Succeeded by Henry Dawkins; William Henry Clinton
Preceded by Edward Golding; Philip Metcalfe	Member of Parliament for Plympton Erle; 1806–1812; With: Sir Stephen Lushington, Bt 1806–1807; Hon. William Harbord 1807–1810; Henry Drummond 1810–1812	Succeeded by Ranald George Macdonald; George Duckett
Preceded by Robert Curzon; James Gordon	Member of Parliament for Clitheroe; 1812–1812; With: Robert Curzon	Succeeded by Robert Curzon; Edward Bootle-Wilbraham
Preceded by John Meade; Hon. Robert Ward	Member of Parliament for Down; 1812–1821; With: John Meade 1812–1817; Lord Arthur Hill 1817–1821	Succeeded by Lord Arthur Hill; Mathew Forde
Preceded by John Douglas; Edmond Alexander MacNaghten	Member of Parliament for Orford; 1821–1822; With: Edmond Alexander MacNaghten	Succeeded by Edmond Alexander MacNaghten; Charles Ross
Political offices
Preceded by The Earl of Shannon; Sir John Parnell, Bt; Hon. Thomas Pelham; John Monck Mason; Lodge Morres	Commissioner of the Treasury for Ireland; 1797–1799; With: The Earl of Shannon; Isaac Corry; Hon. Thomas Pelham; John Monck Mason; Lodge Morres	Succeeded by The Earl of Shannon; Isaac Corry; Charles Abbot; The Lord Frankfort; Viscount Loftus; Maurice FitzGerald
Preceded by The Earl of Shannon; Sir John Parnell, Bt; Hon. Thomas Pelham; John Monck Mason; Lodge Morres	Commissioner of the Treasury for Ireland; 1800; With: The Earl of Shannon; Isaac Corry; Lodge Morres; Viscount Loftus; William Wickham; Mourice FitzGerald	Succeeded by The Earl of Shannon; Isaac Corry; Charles Abbot; The Lord Frankfort; Viscount Loftus; Maurice FitzGerald
Preceded by Hon. Thomas Pelham	Chief Secretary for Ireland; 1798–1801	Succeeded by Charles Abbot
Preceded by The Earl of Dartmouth	President of the Board of Control; 1802–1806	Succeeded by The Lord Minto
Preceded by The Earl Camden	Secretary of State for War and the Colonies; 1805–1806	Succeeded by William Windham
Preceded by William Windham	Secretary of State for War and the Colonies; 1807–1809	Succeeded by The Earl of Liverpool
Preceded by The Marquess Wellesley	Foreign Secretary; 1812–1822	Succeeded by George Canning
Preceded by Hon. Spencer Perceval	Leader of the House of Commons; 1812–1822	Succeeded by George Canning
Peerage of Ireland
Preceded by Robert Stewart	Marquess of Londonderry; 1821–1822	Succeeded by Charles (Stewart) Vane
