= William Brownlow Forde =

Politician from Northern Ireland (1823–1902)

William Brownlow Forde (1823 – 8 February 1902) was the member of parliament for County Down, 1857–1874.

Colonel the Rt. Hon. William Brownlow Forde, PC, JP, DL, of Seaforde, married Adelaide, daughter of General the Hon Robert Meade, of Burrenwood, in 1855, and was High Sheriff of County Down, 1853; Lieutenant-Colonel, the Royal South Down Militia; Colonel, 1854–1881, 5th Battalion, Royal Irish Rifles. He was also a member of the landed gentry.

Parliament of the United Kingdom
| Preceded by Lord Edwin Hill-Trevor; David Stewart Ker | Member of Parliament for Down; 1857 – 1874; With: Lord Edwin Hill-Trevor 1857–1874 | Succeeded by Lord Edwin Hill-Trevor; James Sharman Crawford |
