= Charles Vane-Tempest-Stewart, 6th Marquess of Londonderry =

British Conservative politician, landowner and benefactor (1852–1915)

The Most Honourable The Marquess of Londonderry KG GCVO CB PC JP DL
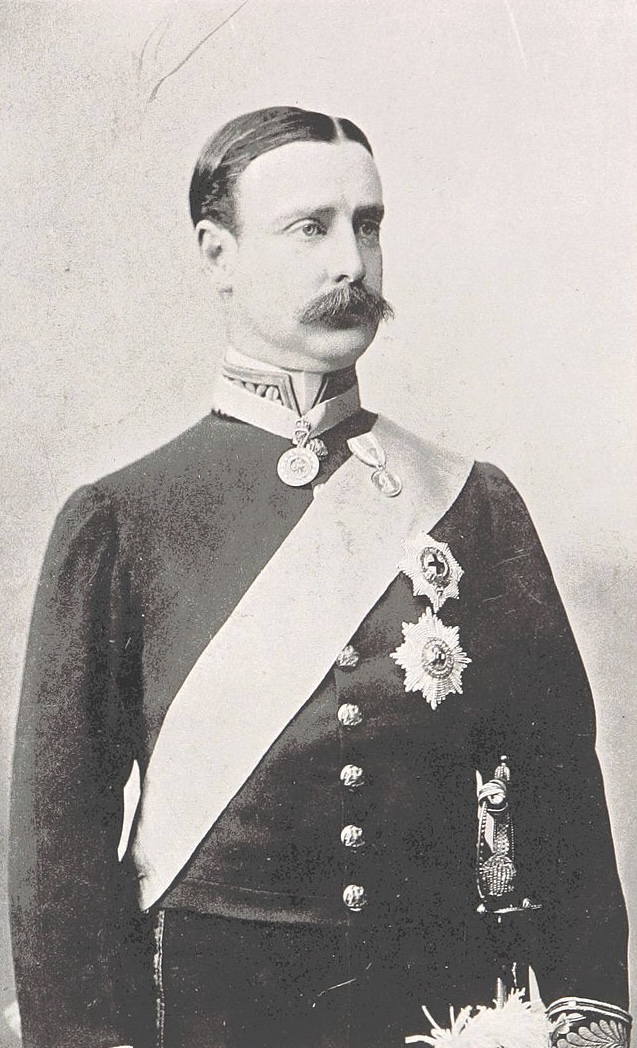
- The Marquess of Londonderry, c. 1889

Lord President of the Council
- In office 19 October 1903 – 11 December 1905
- Monarch: Edward VII
- Prime Minister: Arthur Balfour
- Preceded by: The Duke of Devonshire
- Succeeded by: The Earl of Crewe

President of the Board of Education
- In office 8 August 1902 – 4 December 1905
- Monarch: Edward VII
- Prime Minister: Arthur Balfour
- Preceded by: The Duke of Devonshire
- Succeeded by: Augustine Birrell

Postmaster General
- In office 10 April 1900 – 8 August 1902
- Monarchs: Victoria; Edward VII
- Prime Minister: The Marquess of Salisbury; Arthur Balfour
- Preceded by: The Duke of Norfolk
- Succeeded by: Austen Chamberlain

Lord Lieutenant of Ireland
- In office 3 August 1886 – 30 July 1889
- Monarch: Victoria
- Preceded by: The Earl of Aberdeen
- Succeeded by: The Earl of Zetland

Personal details
- Born: 16 July 1852 London, United Kingdom
- Died: 8 February 1915 (aged 62) Wynyard Park, County Durham, United Kingdom
- Party: Conservative
- Spouse: Lady Theresa Chetwynd-Talbot (d. 1919)
- Children: 3, including Charles Vane-Tempest-Stewart, 7th Marquess of Londonderry
- Parent(s): George Vane-Tempest, 5th Marquess of Londonderry; Mary Edwards
- Education: Christ Church, Oxford

Charles Stewart Vane-Tempest-Stewart, 6th Marquess of Londonderry KG, GCVO, CB, PC, JP, DL (16 July 1852 – 8 February 1915), styled Viscount Castlereagh between 1872 and 1884, was a British Conservative politician, landowner and benefactor, who served in various capacities in the Conservative administrations of the late 19th and early 20th centuries. After succeeding his father in the marquessate in 1884, he was Lord-Lieutenant of Ireland between 1886 and 1889. He later held office as Postmaster General between 1900 and 1902 and as President of the Board of Education between 1902 and 1905. A supporter of the Protestant causes in Ulster, he was an opponent of Irish Home Rule and one of the instigators of the formal alliance between the Conservative Party and the Liberal Unionists in 1893.

== Background and education ==
Born Charles Vane-Tempest in London, he was the eldest son of George Vane-Tempest, 5th Marquess of Londonderry and his wife Mary Cornelia, only daughter of Sir John Edwards, 1st Baronet, who lived primarily at Plas Machynlleth. He was the grandson of the third Marquess and the great-nephew of the second Marquess, better known as the statesman Lord Castlereagh.

To mark his 21st birthday, the people of Machynlleth erected a clock tower in the centre of the town.

George Spencer-Churchill, 8th Duke of Marlborough and his brother Lord Randolph Churchill were his first cousins.

He was educated at Eton, the National University of Ireland and Christ Church, Oxford. He became known by the courtesy title of Viscount Castlereagh when his father succeeded to the marquessate of Londonderry in 1872. In 1885, he assumed the original and additional surname of Stewart by Royal licence.

== Political career ==
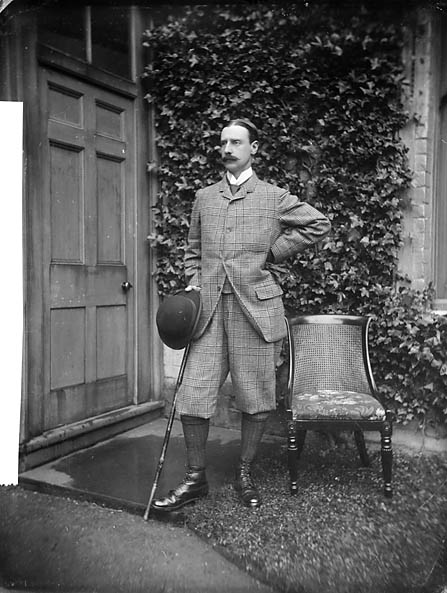
Portrait photograph by John Thomas, c. 1885

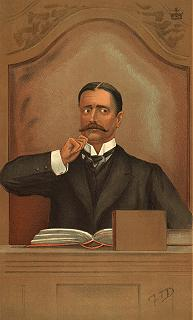
Caricature by FTD for Vanity Fair, 1896

He was returned to parliament as one of two representatives for Down in 1878, a seat he held until 1884, when he succeeded his father in the marquessate and entered the House of Lords. After the Conservatives came to power in 1886 under Lord Salisbury, Lord Londonderry was sworn of the Privy Council and appointed Lord-Lieutenant of Ireland. This was a time of difficulties in Ireland. Gladstone's first Home Rule Bill had just been rejected by parliament and national feelings ran high in Ireland. According to the Dictionary of National Biography, Londonderry "... filled the viceroyalty with tact and courage, so that when he left Dublin in 1889 the discontent had abated and some measure of prosperity had been restored." He was appointed a Knight of the Garter in 1888 and admitted to the Irish Privy Council in 1892. He opposed Gladstone's second Home Rule Bill in 1893 and presided over the meeting which led to the formal political alliance between the Conservatives and the Liberal Unionists.

From 1895 to 1897, Londonderry was Chairman of the London School Board. He returned to the government in April 1900, when Salisbury made him Postmaster General, and became a member of the cabinet in November of that year. After Arthur Balfour became prime minister in August 1902, Londonderry became President of the Board of Education. In this role he oversaw the Education Act 1902. Between 1903 and 1905, he was also Lord President of the Council. The Unionists fell in December 1905, and Londonderry subsequently focused mostly on Irish affairs. He was one of the "scuttlers" (as Leo Maxse termed them) who did not vote against the Parliament Act 1911. As president of the Ulster Unionist Council, he opposed the third Home Rule Bill proposed by the Liberal government in 1912 and was the second signatory to the Ulster Covenant after Sir Edward Carson.

== Other public appointments ==
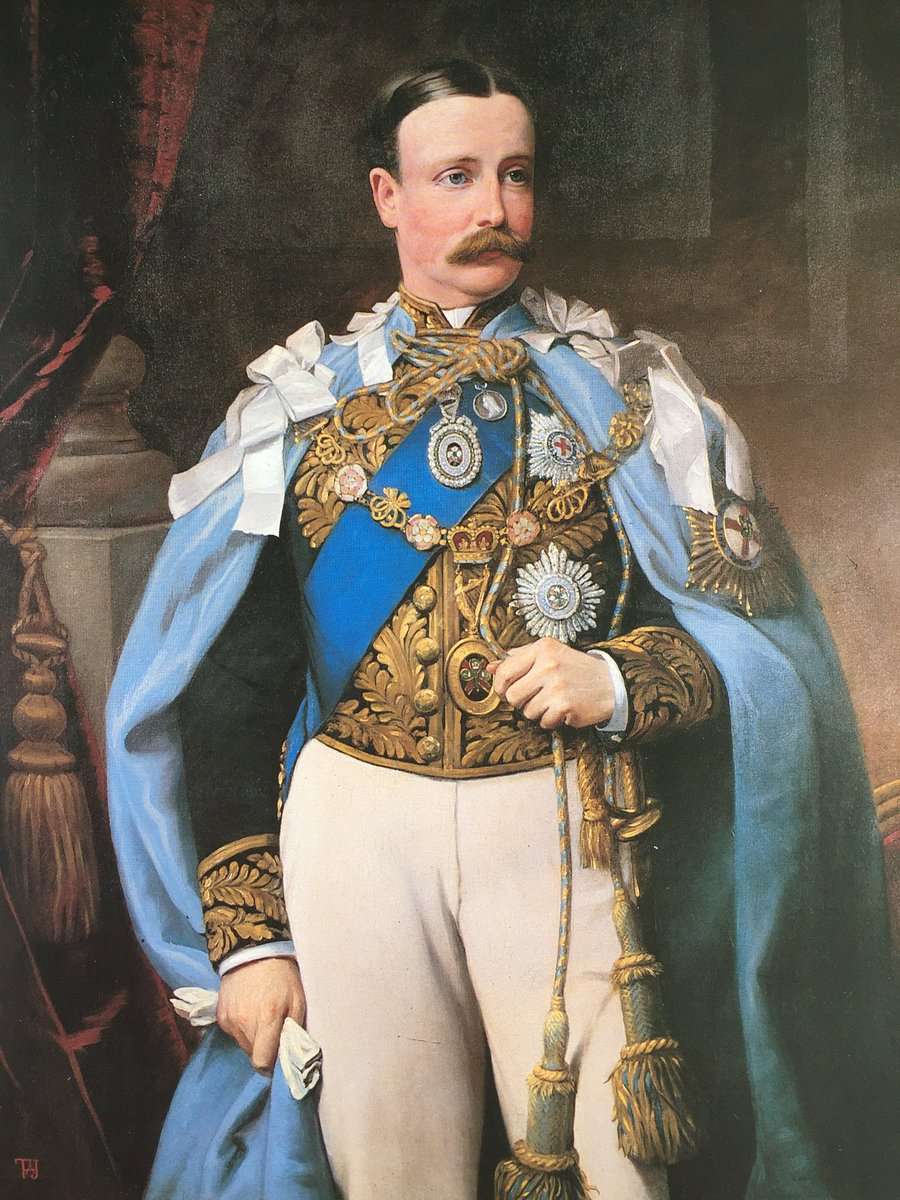
Lord Londonderry wearing the mantle and collar of a Knight of the Order of Saint Patrick and the insignia of the order's Grand Master

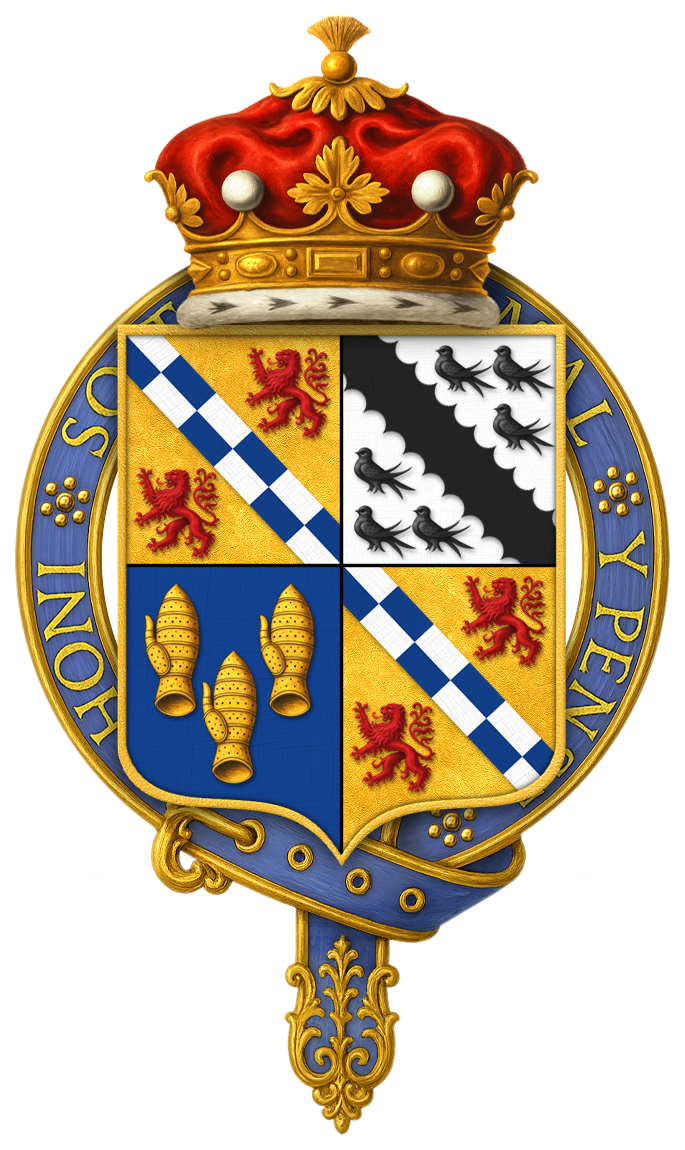
Garter-encircled arms of Charles Vane-Tempest-Stewart, 6th Marquess of Londonderry, KG, GCVO, CB, PC, JP, DL

Lord Londonderry was Lord-Lieutenant of Belfast from 1900 to 1904 and Lord-Lieutenant of Down from 1902 to 1915, a Deputy Lieutenant of Montgomeryshire and County Durham and a Justice of the Peace for County Durham.

On 24 June 1869, just before his 17th birthday, he was commissioned as Major in the 2nd (Seaham) Durham Artillery Volunteer Corps a part-time unit commanded by his father and recruited mainly from the family's Seaham Colliery. (On the same day his 15-year-old younger brother was commissioned as a 1st Lieutenant; their uncle also served in the unit.) He succeeded his father in command in 1876 and was still in command of the unit when it transferred to the Territorial Force in 1908 as the 3rd Northumbrian (County of Durham) Brigade, Royal Field Artillery, of which he became Honorary Colonel on 7 December 1910. He was also appointed to the Honorary Colonelcy of the 3rd (Militia) Battalion of the Royal Irish Rifles on 26 March 1902.

As a large coal owner in County Durham, he played a major role there. In 1910, he was Mayor of Durham, and he received an honorary degree (D.C.L., 1901) from the University of Durham in recognition of his public services.

He was a great benefactor, patron of agriculture and race-horse owner. King Edward VII was a guest at Londonderry's County Durham seat Wynyard Park on five occasions. In 1903 Londonderry was appointed a Knight Grand Cross of the Royal Victorian Order (GCVO) when Edward VII visited Ireland.

== Family ==
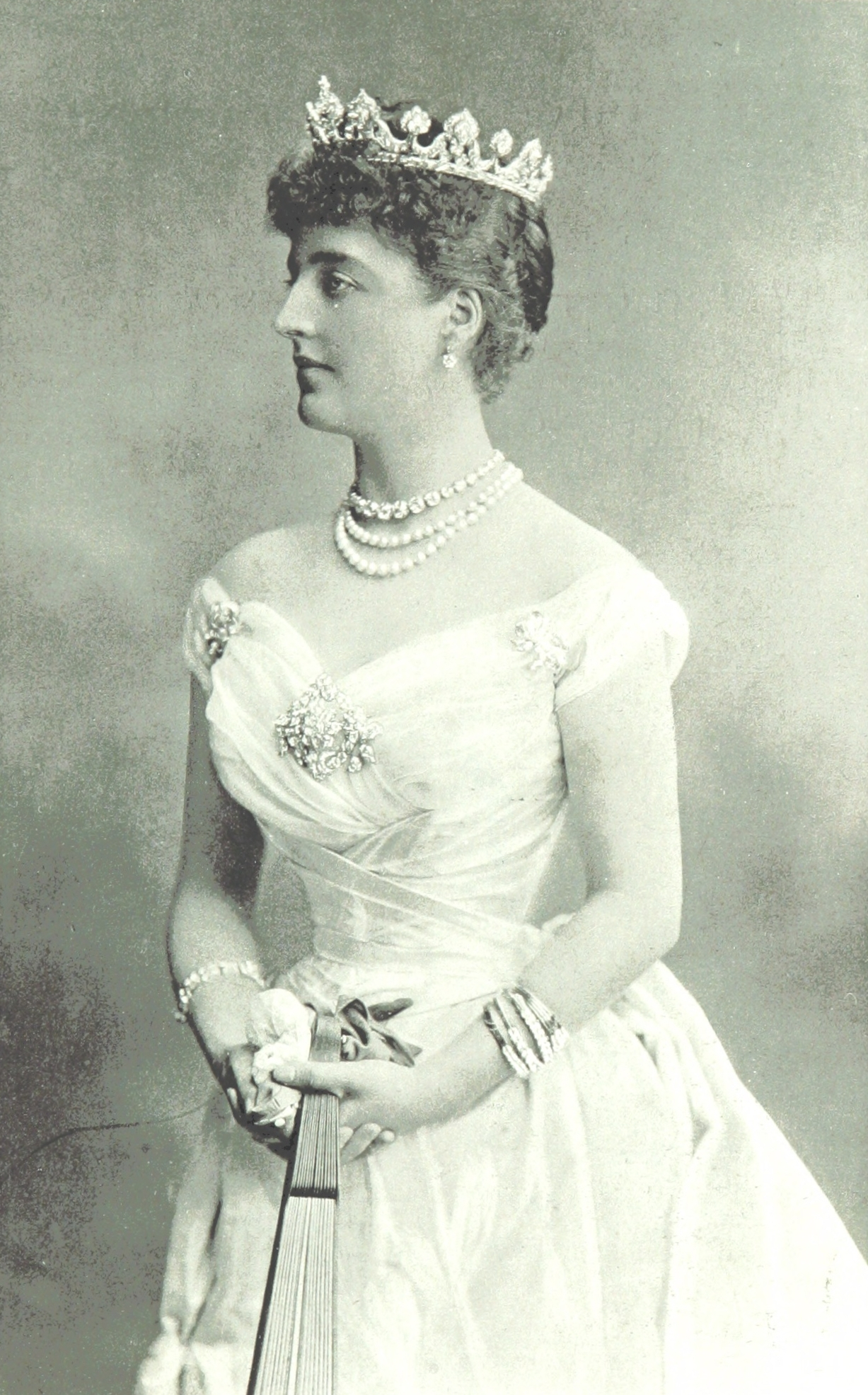
Portrait of his wife

He married Lady Theresa Susey Helen Talbot, daughter of Charles Chetwynd-Talbot, 19th Earl of Shrewsbury, at the private chapel of Alton Hall in 1875. Like her husband, she was a leading Unionist campaigner, and President of the Ulster Women's Unionist Council.

They had two sons and one daughter. The second son, Lord Charles Stewart Reginald Vane-Tempest-Stewart, died in October 1899, aged 19. The daughter, Lady Helen Mary Theresa, married the 6th Earl of Ilchester.

Londonderry died of pneumonia at Wynyard Park, County Durham, in February 1915, aged 62, with his wife at his bedside. In a letter dated 13 February 1915 (at Durham County Record Office, in the Londonderry Archive) written from Wynyard Park, the grieving Lady Londonderry wrote to her grandson Robin, Lord Stewart, at his school, as follows: "I was so glad to get your darling little letter...You can imagine what it is for me to lose Darling Pa ["Pa" was Robin's name for his grandfather] - you are so understanding you will know, and you will remember what companions he and I always were. I am so glad that the last time you saw him we had those two happy dinners when you and Maureen [Robin's sister] made us laugh so and you saw how bright he was. He caught a little cold, but we did not think anything about it, and afterwards I sent for the doctor and he went to bed and then took pneumonia. On Sunday at lunch time I saw that he was very very ill and he died at 9.30 on Monday morning. I never left him all the time and until the very last he heard my voice. He moved and opened his eyes even after the doctors thought he was insensible...I should so have loved you to have been in the Chapel Wednesday night and Thursday. The services were most beautiful and we had all darling Pa's favourite hymns as you will see from the enclosed leaflets...I want you so much never to forget Darling Pa...I am going to direct this letter to you for the last time in your old name" [Robin had now become Viscount Castlereagh, and ceased using his former courtesy title of Lord Stewart]. The 6th Marquess of Londonderry was succeeded by his elder and only surviving son, Charles. The Marchioness of Londonderry died in March 1919.

Parliament of the United Kingdom
Preceded by James Sharman Crawford; Lord Edwin Hill-Trevor	Member of Parliament for Down; 1878–1884; With: Lord Edwin Hill-Trevor 1878–1880; Lord Arthur Hill 1880–1884	Succeeded by Lord Arthur Hill; Richard Ker
Political offices
Preceded by The Earl of Aberdeen	Lord Lieutenant of Ireland; 1886–1889	Succeeded by The Earl of Zetland
Preceded by The Duke of Norfolk	Postmaster General; 1900–1902	Succeeded by Austen Chamberlain
Preceded by The Duke of Devonshire	President of the Board of Education; 1902–1905	Succeeded by Augustine Birrell
Preceded by The Duke of Devonshire	Lord President of the Council; 1903–1905	Succeeded by The Earl of Crewe
Government offices
Preceded by Lord George Hamilton	Chairman of the London School Board; 1895–1897	Succeeded by The Lord Reay
Honorary titles
New office	Lord Lieutenant of Belfast; 1900–1904	Succeeded by The Earl of Shaftesbury
Preceded by The Marquess of Dufferin and Ava	Lord Lieutenant of Down; 1902–1915	Succeeded by The Marquess of Londonderry
Peerage of Ireland
Preceded by George Vane-Tempest	Marquess of Londonderry; 1884–1915	Succeeded by Charles Vane-Tempest-Stewart
