= Alexander Stewart (Londonderry MP, born 1746) =

Irish MP and landowner of Ards, Donegal

- Born: 26 March 1746
- Died: 1831 (aged 84–85)
- Spouse: Mary Moore
- Issue Detail: Alexander Robert Stewart, & others
- Father: Alexander Stewart
- Mother: Mary Cowan
- Occupation: High sheriff, MP, and landowner

Alexander Stewart (1746–1831), known as Alexander Stewart of Ards, was an Irish landowner and member of parliament.

== Birth and origins ==
Alexander was born on 26 March 1746 in Ireland. He was the fifth son of Alexander Stewart and his wife Mary Cowan. His father's family was Ulster Scots and came from County Donegal. His father had bought the Newtownards and Comber estates in County Down in 1743 and lived at Mount Stewart, near Newtownards. His father also still was an alderman of Derry in 1760. His grandfather, Colonel William Stewart, had commanded one of the two companies of Protestant soldiers that Derry admitted into town when Mountjoy was sent to Derry by Tyrconnell before the start of the siege. Alexander's mother was a daughter of John Cowan, alderman of Derry and sister of Robert Cowan, Governor of Bombay. Her family also was Ulster Scots. His parents had married on 30 June 1737 in Dublin. He had six siblings, who are listed in his father's article.

Family tree

Alexander Stewart with wife, parents, and other selected relatives. (Note: Also see the lists of siblings and children in the text.)

William; Stewart; Colonel	John; Cowan; Alderman of Derry
Alexander; 1699–1781	Mary; Cowan d. 1788	Robert; Cowan d. 1737; Governor of Bombay
Sarah; Frances; Seymour- Conway; 1747–1770	Robert; 1st Marquess; 1739–1821	Frances; Pratt c. 1751 – 1833	Alexander of Ards; 1746–1831	Mary; Moore; 1772–1842
Robert; 2nd Marquess; 1769–1822; Castlereagh	Charles; 3rd Marquess; 1778–1854	Alexander; Robert; 1795–1850	Caroline; Pratt d. 1827
Frederick; 4th Marquess; 1805–1872	George; 5th Marquess; 1821–1884	Alexander; John; Robert; 1827–1904

Legend

XXX	Subject of the article	XXX	Marquesses of Londonderry

== Ards House ==
In 1782, after his father's death in the preceding year, Alexander Stewart, probably using some money from the inheritance, bought the Ards House and some surrounding lands near it on the shores of Sheephaven Bay near Dunfanaghy, County Donegal, for £13,250 from William Wray and started to live there. He and his heirs were therefore known as the Stewarts of Ards. The Ards House was demolished in the early 1960s, but the wooded park in which it stood still exists and is known as the Ards Forest Park.

== Marriage ==
On 2 October 1791 Alexander Stewart of Ards, as he was now, married Mary Moore, daughter of Charles Moore, 1st Marquess of Drogheda and granddaughter of Francis Seymour-Conway, 1st Marquess of Hertford. Mary was the niece of Sarah Frances Seymour-Conway, the first wife of Alexander's eldest brother Robert, Lord Londonderry.

Alexander and Mary had among other children three sons who reached adulthood:

1. Alexander Robert Stewart (1795–1850), succeeded him
2. Charles Moore (1799–1831), became a minister of a church, probably Presbyterian
3. John Vandeleur (1802–1872) of Rock Hill (near Letterkenny)

== Politics and later life ==
Stewart was appointed High Sheriff of Donegal for 1791–92.

Stewart sat as member of parliament (MP) in the Irish Parliament in 1800–1801. He was elected for the County Londonderry constituency of the Irish Parliament in 1800, sat for County Londonderry for one month and then exchanged it for the borough of Thomastown for which he sat until Irish Parliament was abolished due to the Acts of Union in 1801.

Stewart also sat for the UK Parliament from 1814 to 1818. On 19 July 1814 he was elected for the Londonderry constituency of the UK Parliament to replace his nephew Sir Charles Stewart who had on 1 July 1814 been raised to the peerage as Baron Stewart. He thus served as "a family stopgap" who "supported [the Earl of Liverpool's Tory] government silently". He sat for the constituency for four years until the 1818 general election, when his son Alexander-Robert was elected, having come of age.

Alexander Stewart of Ards died in 1831.

== Notes and references ==
=== Sources ===
- Bew, John (2012). Castlereagh: A Life. London: Oxford University Press. ISBN 978-0-19-993159-0. – (Snippet view)
- Burke, Sir Bernard (1879). A Genealogical and Heraldic History of the Landed Gentry of Great Britain and Ireland. Vol. II (6th ed.). London: Harrison. OCLC 972909415. – L to Z
- Debrett, John (1828). Peerage of the United Kingdom of Great Britain and Ireland. Vol. II (17th ed.). London: F. C. and J. Rivington. OCLC 54499602. – Scotland and Ireland
- House of Commons (1878). Return. Members of Parliament – Part II. Parliaments of Great Britain, 1705–1796. Parliaments of the United Kingdom, 1801–1874. Parliaments and Conventions of the Estates of Scotland, 1357–1707. Parliaments of Ireland, 1599–1800. London: His/Her Majesty's Stationery Office. OCLC 13112546.
- Johnston, G. Harvey (1906). The Heraldry of the Stewarts. Edinburgh: W. & A. K. Johnston. OCLC 186630114.
- Jupp, P. J. "Stewart, Alexander II (1746–1831), of Ards, Letterkenny, co. Donegal". History of Parliament Online.
- Trench, Charlotte Violet (1945). The Wrays of Donegal, Londonderry and Antrim. Oxford: Oxford University Press. OCLC 500003513.
- Watson, I. B. (2004). "Cowan, Sir Robert (d.1737)". In Matthew, Colin; Harrison, Brian (eds.). Oxford Dictionary of National Biography. Vol. 13. New York: Oxford University Press. pp. 752–753. ISBN 0-19-861363-6.

Parliament of the United Kingdom
Preceded by Hon. William Ponsonby; Hon. Charles William Stewart	Member of Parliament for Londonderry; 1814 – 1818; With: Hon. William Ponsonby to 1815; George Robert Dawson from 1815	Succeeded by George Robert Dawson; Alexander Robert Stewart
