= Alexander Robert Stewart =

Irish landowner and member of parliament

Alexander Robert Stewart (12 September 1795 – 25 March 1850) was an Irish landowner and member of parliament.

He was the son of Alexander Stewart of Ards by his wife Lady Mary, daughter of Charles Moore, 1st Marquess of Drogheda. His uncle was Robert Stewart, 1st Marquess of Londonderry and he was first cousin to Robert Stewart, Viscount Castlereagh (Secretary of State for Foreign Affairs during the Napoleonic Wars and principal British diplomat at the Congress of Vienna) and Charles Vane, 3rd Marquess of Londonderry.

He was elected to Parliament for Londonderry at the 1818 general election, succeeding his father, and sat until the 1830 general election and "supported [the Earl of Liverpool's Tory] government silently". He was commissioned as Lieutenant-Colonel of the disembodied Londonderry Militia in October 1822 following the death of his cousin Castlereagh, who had been Colonel of the regiment. He was also appointed High Sheriff of Donegal for 1831.

On 28 July 1825 he married Lady Caroline Pratt, daughter of John Jeffreys Pratt, 1st Marquess Camden. Her aunt Lady Frances Pratt was the second wife of the first Marquess of Londonderry and the mother of the third Marquess.

Alexander Robert Stewart lived at the family estate of Ards House, Dunfanaghy, County Donegal. His family papers are in the Public Record Office of Northern Ireland.

Parliament of the United Kingdom
Preceded by George Robert Dawson; Alexander Stewart	Member of Parliament for Londonderry; 1818 – 1830; With: George Robert Dawson	Succeeded by Theobald Jones; Sir Robert Bateson, Bt
