= Alexander Stewart (1699–1781) =

Irish landowner (1699/1700–1781)

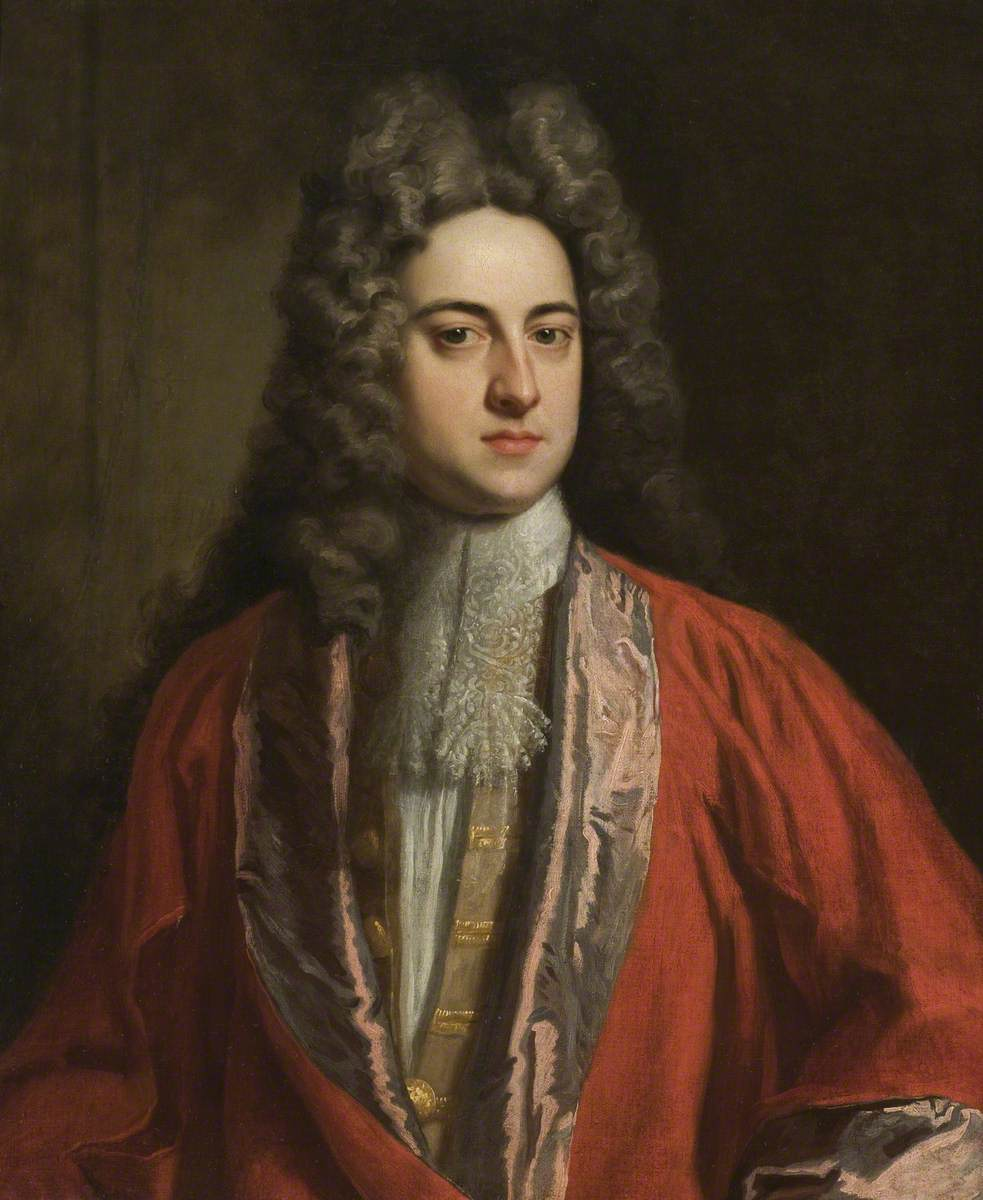
- c. 1720–1725 portrait
- Born: 1699/1700; Ireland
- Died: 2 April 1781 (aged 81–82)
- Spouse: Mary Cowan (m. 1737)
- Children: Robert, Alexander, 3 other sons and 2 daughters
- Parent: William Stewart

Alexander Stewart (1699/1700 – 2 April 1781) was an Irish landowner who grew rich by inheriting a fortune from Robert Cowan, an East India Company official who served as the governor of Bombay. His son Robert became the 1st Marquess of Londonderry.

== Birth and origins ==
Alexander was born in 1699 or 1700 at Ballylawn Castle, near Manorcunningham in County Donegal. He was the second son of William Stewart and his wife. His father had his lands consolidated by Charles I under the name of Stewart's Court, raised a Williamite troop of horse in the run-up to the Siege of Derry and was therefore known as Colonel William Stewart.

Alexander's grandfather is not known by name, but Alexander was a great-grandson of Charles Stewart, whose father John was given land at Ballylawn in County Donegal in the plantation of Ulster, built Ballylawn Castle on that land, and held fishing rights in Lough Swilly. (Note: There are two townlands called Ballylawn in county Donegal: one in Raymoghie Parish, Raphoe Barony, near Manorcunningham; the other in Moville Upper Parish, Inishowen East Barony. The castle stood in the one near Manorcunningham, but Bew in error placed it near Moville.) John Stewart is likely to have been a younger son of the Stewarts of Garlies in Galloway, Scotland.

Alexander's mother, whose first name is unknown, was a daughter of William Stewart of Fort Stewart, near Ramelton, County Donegal. The Stewart family background was Scots-Irish and Presbyterian.

He appears below as the younger of two brothers:

1. Thomas (died 1740), inherited Ballylawn and pursued a military career but died childless in 1740
2. Alexander (1699–1781)

Family tree

Alexander Stewart with wife and other selected relatives. (Note: Also see the lists of siblings and children in the text.)

John; Stewart d. c. 1650
Charles; Stewart
?
William; Stewart; Colonel	John; Cowan; Alderman of Derry
Thomas d. 1740; Captain	Alexander; 1699–1781	Mary; Cowan d. 1788	Robert; Cowan d. 1737; Bombay; Governor
Sarah; Frances; Seymour- Conway; 1747–1770	Robert; 1st Marquess; 1739–1821	Frances; Pratt c. 1751 – 1833	Alexander of Ards; 1746–1831
Robert; 2nd Marquess; 1769–1822; Castlereagh	Charles; 3rd Marquess; 1778–1854

Legend

XXX	Subject of the article	XXX	Robert; Cowan	XXX	Marquesses of Londonderry

== Early life ==
Alexander, as a younger son, went into commerce with an apprenticeship at Belfast and became a successful merchant in the Baltic trade. He also became an elder in the First Presbyterian Church in Rosemary Street, Belfast. During his residence in Belfast he became a convinced Whig, in line with the general reformist sentiment of the Presbyterian town.

== Marriage and children ==
Alexander Stewart married on 30 June 1737 in Dublin a cousin, Mary Cowan, daughter of John Cowan, alderman of Londonderry and his wife Anne Stewart, daughter of Alexander Stewart of Ballylawn, and sister of the former Governor of Bombay, Robert Cowan, who had died on 21 February 1737 in London.

Alexander and Mary had seven children:

1. Anne (1738–1781)
2. Robert (1739–1821), became the 1st Marquess of Londonderry
3. William (1741–1742)
4. Francis (born 1742)
5. John (1744–1762)
6. Alexander (1746–1831), married Mary Moore, the 3rd daughter of the 1st Marquess of Drogheda
7. Mary (born 1747), died young

== Brother's death and succession ==
In 1740, his elder brother Thomas died and Alexander inherited the Ballylawn estate.

== Cowan inheritance ==
He then acquired the rights to Robert Cowan's substantial estate. Being now rich, Stewart retired from business in 1743, and used the money from the Cowan inheritance to become a substantial landowner in County Down by buying estates at Comber and Newtownards in 1744.

== Mount Stewart ==
Around 1750, Alexander Stewart rebuilt a house called Mount Pleasant on his estate near Newtownards and renamed it Mount Stewart. In 1780, Stewart commissioned the Temple of the Winds at Mount Stewart from James "Athenian" Stuart. This is an octagonal neo-classical building that was completed by his son Robert after his death.

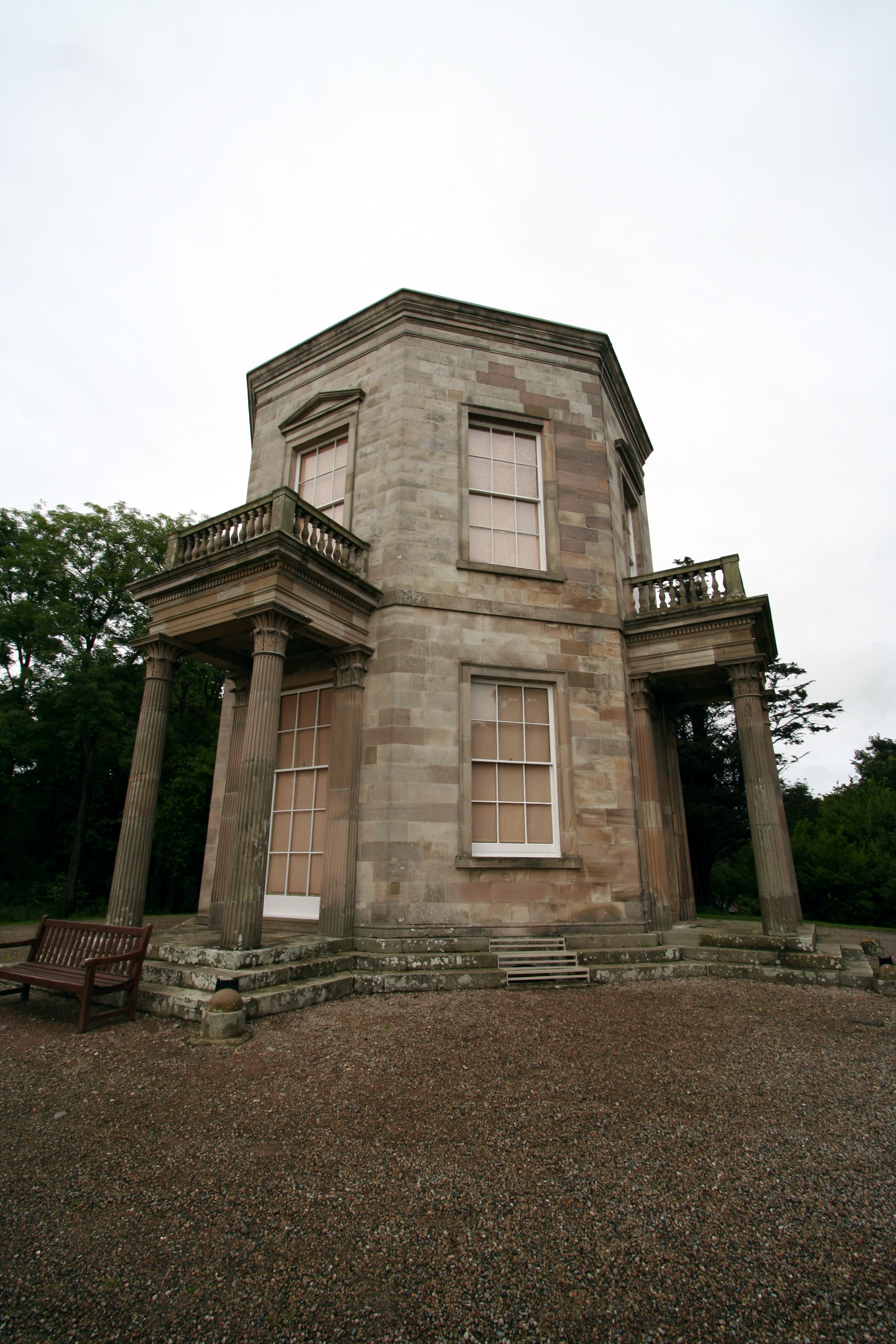
The Temple of the Winds at Mount Stewart, commissioned by Alexander Stewart

In 1755, he was left the property of William Bruce, a Dublin bookseller from Killyleagh, which he divided between Bruce's relations.

== In politics ==
In 1759, the member of the Parliament of Ireland for the city of Londonderry, William Scott, was raised to the bench. Initially, William Hamilton was elected to succeed him, but the election was declared void. Alexander Stewart was returned in his place in April 1760, but he was also declared not duly elected. Eventually Hamilton represented the constituency from May 1760 until his death later that year.

== Death and timeline ==
Stewart died on 2 April 1781 and was succeeded by his eldest son Robert. The Stewart family papers are preserved in the Public Record Office of Northern Ireland.

Timeline
Age	Date	Event
0	1699	Born
14–15	1714, 1 Aug	Accession of King George I, succeeding Queen Anne
27–28	1727, 11 Jun	Accession of King George II, succeeding King George I
37–38	1737, 30 Jun	Married Mary Cowan
43–44	1743	Bought 60 townlands in County Down
60–61	1760, 25 Oct	Accession of King George III, succeeding King George II
81–82	1781, 2 Apr	Died

== Notes and references ==
=== Sources ===
- Benson, C. J. (2004). "Bruce, William (1702–1755)". In Matthew, Henry Colin Gray.; Harrison, Brian (eds.). Oxford Dictionary of National Biography. Vol. 8. New York: Oxford University Press. p. 336. ISBN 0-19-861411-X.
- Bew, John (2012). Castlereagh: A Life. London: Oxford University Press. ISBN 978-0-19-993159-0. – (Snippet view)
- Burke, Bernard (1869). A Genealogical and Heraldic Dictionary of the Peerage and Baronetage of the British Empire (31st ed.). London: Harrison. OCLC 1045624502. – The 31st Edition gives Stewarts as ancestors whereas the 99th Edition gives Tempests and Vanes.
- Debrett, John (1828). Peerage of the United Kingdom of Great Britain and Ireland. Vol. II (17th ed.). London: F. C. and J. Rivington. OCLC 54499602. – Scotland and Ireland
- Fryde, Edmund Boleslaw; Greenway, D. E.; Porter, S.; Roy, I., eds. (1986). Handbook of British Chronology. Royal Historical Society Guides and Handbooks, No. 2 (3rd ed.). London: Offices of the Royal Historical Society. ISBN 0-86193-106-8. – (for timeline)
- Graham, Rev. John (1841). Ireland Preserved; or the Siege of Londonderry and the Battle of Aughrim with Lyrical Poetry and Biographical Notes (2nd ed.). Dublin: Hardy and Walker. OCLC 00992682. – Short biographies in the biographical notes
- House of Commons (1878). Return. Members of Parliament – Part II. Parliaments of Great Britain, 1705–1796. Parliaments of the United Kingdom, 1801–1874. Parliaments and Conventions of the Estates of Scotland, 1357–1707. Parliaments of Ireland, 1599–1800. London: His/Her Majesty's Stationery Office. OCLC 13112546.
- Hyde, H. Montgomery (1933). The Rise of Castlereagh. London: MacMillan. OCLC 1041306416.
- Johnston, G. Harvey (1906). The Heraldry of the Stewarts. Edinburgh: W. & A. K. Johnston. OCLC 186630114.
- Philips, M. "The Schools' Collection". Dúchas. National Folklore Foundation, University College Dublin.
- "Ballylawn Townland, near Manorcunningham, Co. Donegal". Irish Townlands. Irish OpenStreetMap Community.
- "Ballylawn Townland, near Moville, Co. Donegal". Irish Townlands. Irish OpenStreetMap Community.
- Watt, Dr Neil. "Mary Cowan".
- "Vane-Tempest-Stewart family, Marquesses of Londonderry".
