= Charles Vane, 3rd Marquess of Londonderry =

Anglo-Irish soldier (1778–1854)

Lieutenant-General The Most Honourable The Marquess of Londonderry KG GCB GCH PC
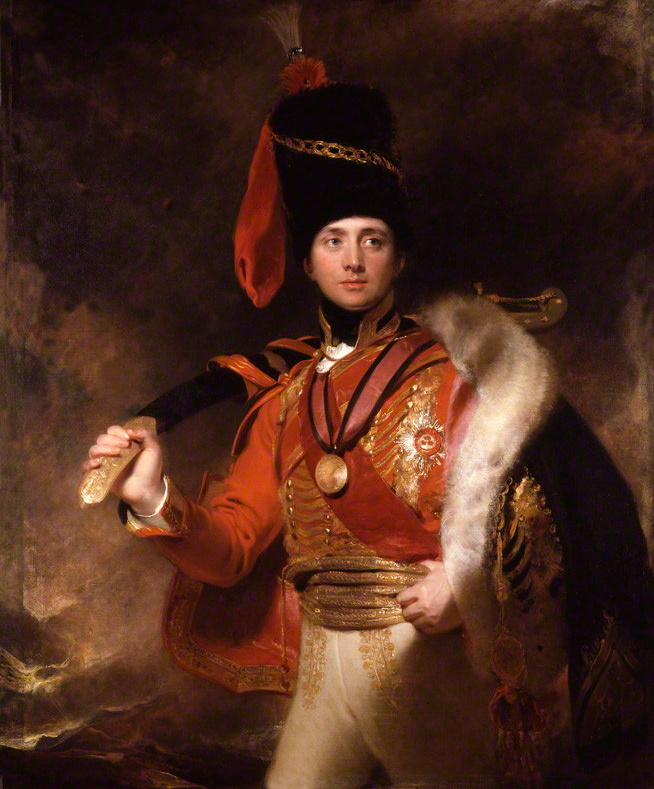
- Portrait of Sir Charles Stewart by Sir Thomas Lawrence, 1812
- Born: 18 May 1778; Mary Street, Dublin, Ireland
- Died: 6 March 1854 (aged 75); Londonderry House, London, England
- Buried: Longnewton, County Durham, England
- Spouses: Lady Catherine Bligh; Lady Frances Vane-Tempest
- Issue: Frederick Stewart, 4th Marquess of Londonderry; George Vane-Tempest, 5th Marquess of Londonderry; Frances Spencer-Churchill, Duchess of Marlborough; Alexandrina Dawson-Damer, Countess of Portarlington; Lord Adolphus Vane-Tempest; Lady Adelaide Vane; Lord Ernest Vane-Tempest
- Father: Robert Stewart, 1st Marquess of Londonderry
- Mother: Frances Pratt

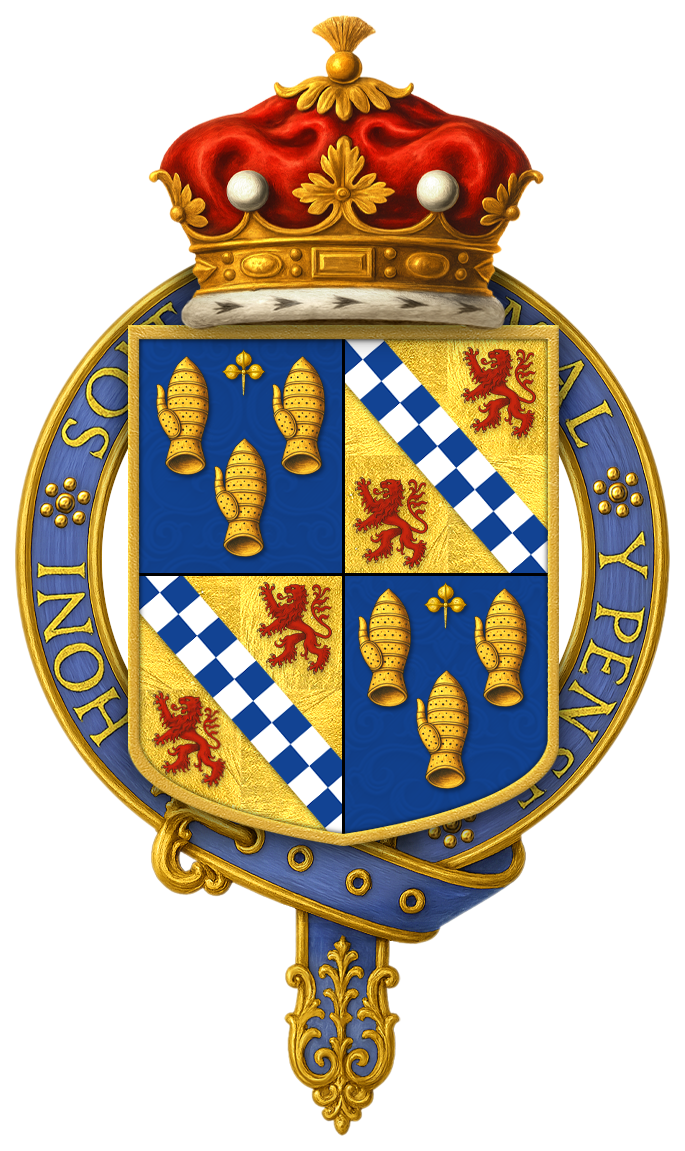
Quartered arms of Charles Vane, 3rd Marquess of Londonderry, KG, GCB, GCH, PC

Lieutenant-General Charles William Vane, 3rd Marquess of Londonderry KG, GCB, GCH, PC (né Stewart; 18 May 1778 – 6 March 1854), was an Anglo-Irish nobleman, soldier and politician. He served in the French Revolutionary Wars, in the suppression of the Irish Rebellion of 1798, and in the Napoleonic Wars. He excelled as a cavalry commander in the Peninsular War (1807–1814) under Sir John Moore and the Duke of Wellington.

On resigning from his post under Wellington in 1812, his half-brother Lord Castlereagh helped him to launch a diplomatic career. He was posted to Berlin in 1813, and then as ambassador to Austria, where Castlereagh was the British plenipotentiary at the Congress of Vienna.

He married Lady Catherine Bligh in 1804 and then, in 1819, Lady Frances Vane-Tempest, a wealthy heiress, changing his surname to her family name of Vane ( a legal requirement tied to his second wife's inheritance ) and thus becoming Charles Vane. In 1822 he succeeded his half-brother as 3rd Marquess of Londonderry, inheriting estates in the north of Ireland where, as an unyielding landlord, his reputation suffered in the Great Famine. It was a reputation he matched as a coal operator on his wife's land in County Durham. In opposition to the Mines and Collieries Act 1842, he was vocal in his support for the right of mine owners to use child labour ( a view shared by the majority of mine owners at the time).

== Early life ==
Charles was born in Dublin as the second son of Robert Stewart and the first son by his second wife Frances Pratt. His father's family was Ulster-Scots and had been a Presbyterian before converting to the established Anglican communion of the Anglo-Irish aristocracy within whose ranks money (an East-India fortune acquired through his first wife) enabled him to move. Robert Stewart was created Viscount Castlereagh in 1795 and the Marquess of Londonderry in 1816.

Charles's mother was English, a daughter of Charles Pratt, 1st Earl Camden, a leading English jurist. His parents had married on 7 June 1775. Charles was brought up as an Anglican, a member of the Church of Ireland.

Charles had a half-brother from his father's first marriage who played an important role in his life:

- Robert (1769–1822), known as "Lord Castlereagh", who achieved prominence as Foreign Secretary

In addition Charles had 11 full siblings, who are listed in his father's article.

Family tree

Charles Vane with his two wives, his parents, and other selected relatives. (Note: This family tree is based on the genealogies of the marquesses of Londonderry. Also see the lists of children in the text.)

Alexander; 1699–1781	Mary; Cowan d. 1788
Sarah Frances; Seymour; 1747–1770	Robert; 1st Marquess; 1739–1821	Frances; Pratt c. 1751 – 1833
Robert; 2nd Marquess; 1769–1822; Castlereagh	Catherine; Bligh d. 1812	Charles; 3rd Marquess; 1778–1854	Frances; Vane; 1800–1865
Frederick; 4th Marquess; 1805–1872	Elizabeth; Jocelyn; 1813–1884	George; 5th Marquess; 1821–1884	Mary; Edwards d. 1906
Charles; 6th Marquess; 1852–1915	Theresa; Talbot d. 1919

Legend

XXX	Charles; Vane	XXX	Marquesses of Londonderry

In 1789, when he was 11, his father, Robert Stewart, was created Baron Londonderry. In 1795, his father was further created Viscount Castlereagh and in 1796, he was finally elevated to Marquess of Londonderry in the Irish peerage.

== Military and parliamentary career ==
On 3 April 1791, at the age of 12, Charles Stewart entered the British Army as an ensign in the 108th Regiment. He was commissioned a lieutenant on 8 January 1793 in this same unit. He saw service in 1794 in the Flanders Campaign of the French Revolutionary Wars, and on the Rhine and Danube in 1795.

He was lieutenant-colonel of the 5th Royal Irish Dragoons by the time he helped put down the Irish Rebellion of 1798. In 1803, Stewart was appointed aide-de-camp to King George III.

In 1800, Charles Stewart was elected in the Tory interest to the Irish House of Commons as member of parliament for Thomastown borough, County Kilkenny, in place of George Dunbar, and after only two months exchanged this seat for that of County Londonderry, being replaced at Thomastown by John Cradock. After the abolition of the Irish Parliament with the Act of Union in 1801, In July and August 1802 Stewart was re-elected for County Londonderry seat in the first general election of the United Kingdom and sat until the parliament's dissolution in 1806. He was reelected again in 1806, in 1807, after which he became Under-Secretary of State for War and the Colonies, and again in 1812. In July 1814 he was summoned to the House of Lords and replaced as MP for Londonderry by his uncle Alexander Stewart of Ards.

== Marriage and children ==
On 8 August 1804 at the church of St George's, Hanover Square, London, Charles Stewart married Lady Catherine Bligh. She was the 4th and youngest daughter of the 3rd Earl of Darnley. She was three years his senior. Lady Catherine died during the night of 10–11 February 1812, of fever following a minor operation, while her husband was on his way home from Spain. They had one son:

- Frederick William Robert Stewart, 4th Marquess of Londonderry (1805–1872)

In 1819, he married Lady Frances Vane-Tempest, daughter and heiress of Sir Henry Vane-Tempest, 2nd Baronet, and Anne MacDonnell, 2nd Countess of Antrim. She was 22 years his junior. They had six children:

- George Henry Robert Charles William Vane-Tempest, 5th Marquess of Londonderry (1821–1884)
- Lady Frances Anne Emily Vane (1822–1899); married John Spencer-Churchill, 7th Duke of Marlborough.
- Lady Alexandrina Octavia Maria Vane (1823–1874), godchild of Alexander I of Russia; married Henry Dawson-Damer, 3rd Earl of Portarlington.
- Lord Adolphus Frederick Charles William Vane-Tempest (1825–1864), politician; became insane, and had to be medically restrained.
- Lady Adelaide Emelina Caroline Vane (c. 1830–1882); disgraced the family by eloping with her brother's tutor, Rev. Frederick Henry Law.
- Lord Ernest McDonnell Vane-Tempest (1836–1885), fell in with a press-gang and had to be bought a commission in the army, from which he was subsequently cashiered.

== Peninsular War ==
The remainder of his military career developed during the Napoleonic Wars, more exactly in the Peninsular War.

=== Corunna ===
The war started with the Corunna Campaign (1808–1809), in which the British troops were commanded by Sir John Moore. In this campaign Charles Stewart commanded a brigade of cavalry, and played, together with Lord Paget, a prominent role in the cavalry clash of Benavente where the French General Lefebvre-Desnouettes was taken prisoner. He suffered from ophthalmia during the latter stages of the retreat. Moore sent him back to London carrying dispatches for Castlereagh and other leading figures and he missed the climactic battle where British forces successfully managed to evacuate in the face of Marshal Soult's army at which Moore was killed in action.

=== Wellesley's Spanish campaign ===
When British troops returned to the Iberian Peninsula after the Corunna Campaign, they were commanded by Sir Arthur Wellesley (later the Duke of Wellington). Charles Stewart was appointed, in April 1809, Adjutant General to Wellesley. This was an administrative job and not much to his liking, especially as Wellesley never discussed his decisions with subordinates. Nevertheless, he sometimes managed to see action and distinguished himself, for example spontaneously leading a squadron cavalry charge at the Second Battle of Porto (May 1809), and further distinguishing himself at the battle of Talavera (July 1809), for which he received the thanks of the Parliament on 2 February 1810, when he returned to England due to illness. He also excelled at Bussaco in September 1810 and at Fuentes de Oñoro (May 1811) where he took a French colonel prisoner in single combat.

He resigned his position as Adjutant General in February 1812. Some say due to bad health, but others say that Wellington fired him. Wellington apparently appreciated him as a soldier but judged him a "sad brouillon and mischief-maker" among his staff. He served Emperor Alexander I of Russia during 1813–1814. During his visit to St Petersburg in 1836, Emperor Nicholas I honoured him with a medal commemorating the 1814 capture of Paris and invited him to a Christmas Day ceremony marking Russia’s liberation.

On 30 January 1813 he became a Knight Companion of the Bath, which made him Sir Charles Stewart. On 20 November 1813, he was made Colonel of the 25th Light Dragoons, an honorary position.

== Diplomatic career ==
His half-brother Robert had made a brilliant diplomatic and political career. Charles and his half-brother remained lifelong friends and wrote each other many letters. Robert helped Charles to start a diplomatic career.

=== Berlin ===
From May 1813 until the end of the war, Sir Charles was Envoy Extraordinary and Minister Plenipotentiary to Berlin, and was also Military Commissioner with the allied armies, being wounded at the Battle of Kulm in August 1813.

=== Vienna ===
In 1814 he was also appointed Ambassador to Austria, a post he held for nine years (1814–1823). On 18 June 1814, to make him more acceptable in Vienna, Stewart was ennobled as Baron Stewart, of Stewart's Court and Ballylawn in County Donegal, by the Prince Regent. In the same year, he received honorary degrees from Oxford and Cambridge, was admitted to the Privy Council, and was appointed a Lord of the Bedchamber to the king.

Lord Stewart, as he now was, attended the Congress of Vienna with his half-brother Lord Castlereagh as one of the British plenipotentiaries. He was not well regarded as he made a spectacle of himself with his loutish behaviour, was apparently rather often inebriated, and frequented prostitutes quite openly. He earned himself the sobriquet of Lord Pumpernickel after a loutish character in a play in fashion.

In the following years he also served as British observer at the congresses of Troppau, Laibach and Verona. As the great powers were taking an increasingly reactionary approach, the British government sent Lord Stewart to observe, but not participate in the decisions.

=== Second marriage and children ===
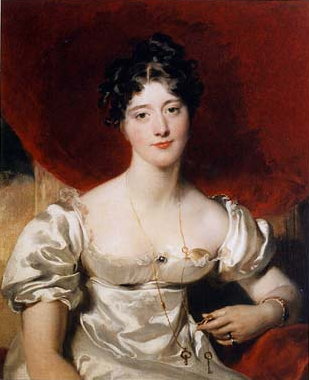
Engagement Portrait of Frances Vane by Thomas Lawrence, 1818

Before the end of his diplomatic career Lord Stewart had, on 3 April 1819, married his second wife, Lady Frances Vane-Tempest, a daughter and heiress of Sir Henry Vane-Tempest, at her mother's house in Bruton Street, Mayfair, and took her surname of Vane, by Royal licence, as had been stipulated in her father's will. He was henceforth known as Charles William Vane, whereas his son from his first marriage stayed Frederick Stewart.

Children by Lady Frances Vane-Tempest:

1. George Henry Robert Charles William Vane-Tempest, 5th Marquess of Londonderry (1821–1884)
2. Lady Frances Anne Emily Vane (1822–1899); married John Spencer-Churchill, 7th Duke of Marlborough.
3. Lady Alexandrina Octavia Maria Vane (1823–1874), godchild of Alexander I of Russia; married Henry Dawson-Damer, 3rd Earl of Portarlington.
4. Lord Adolphus Frederick Charles William Vane-Tempest (1825–1864), politician; became insane, and had to be medically restrained.
5. Lady Adelaide Emelina Caroline Vane (c. 1830–1882); disgraced the family by eloping with her brother's tutor, Rev. Frederick Henry Law.
6. Lord Ernest McDonnell Vane-Tempest (1836–1885), fell in with a press-gang and had to be bought a commission in the army, from which he was subsequently cashiered.

Through his daughter Lady Frances, Lord Londonderry is the maternal grandfather of Lord Randolph Churchill, and consequently a great-grandfather of Winston Churchill.

=== Castlereagh's suicide ===
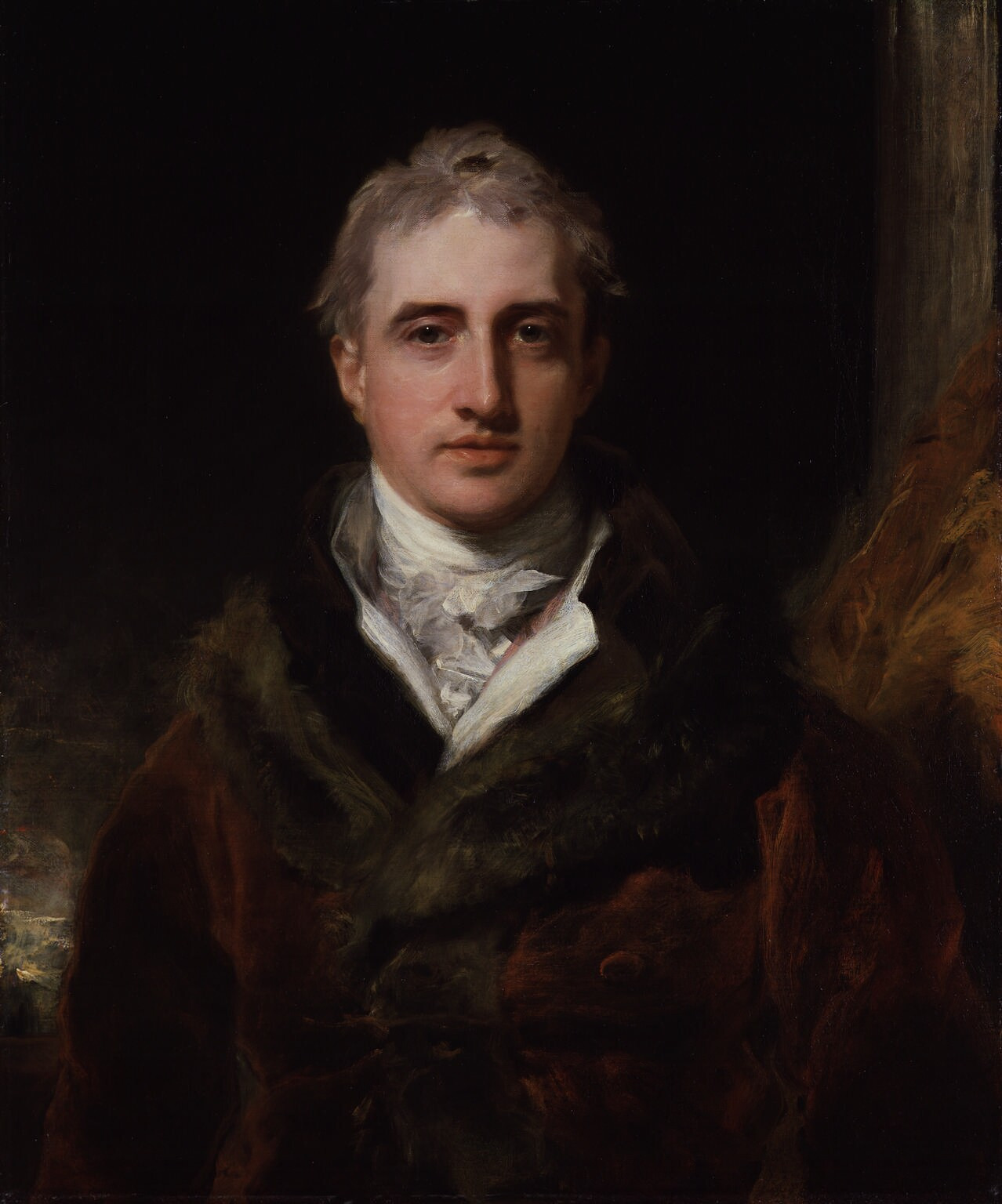
Portrait of Lord Castlereagh by Thomas Lawrence. Stewart was shocked by his elder brother's suicide in 1822 and resigned his post as Ambassador to Austria after the Congress of Verona.

On 12 August 1822, his half-brother committed suicide. He succeeded his half-brother as 3rd Marquess of Londonderry in 1822. The following year Lord Londonderry was also created Earl Vane and Viscount Seaham, of Seaham in the County Palatine of Durham, with remainder to the heirs male of the body of his second wife.

His half-brother's death also meant the end of his diplomatic career. He quit the diplomatic service in 1823. Queen Victoria had a low opinion of Londonderry's abilities as a civil servant. She said that he should, in her opinion, not be given any post of importance.

=== Residences ===
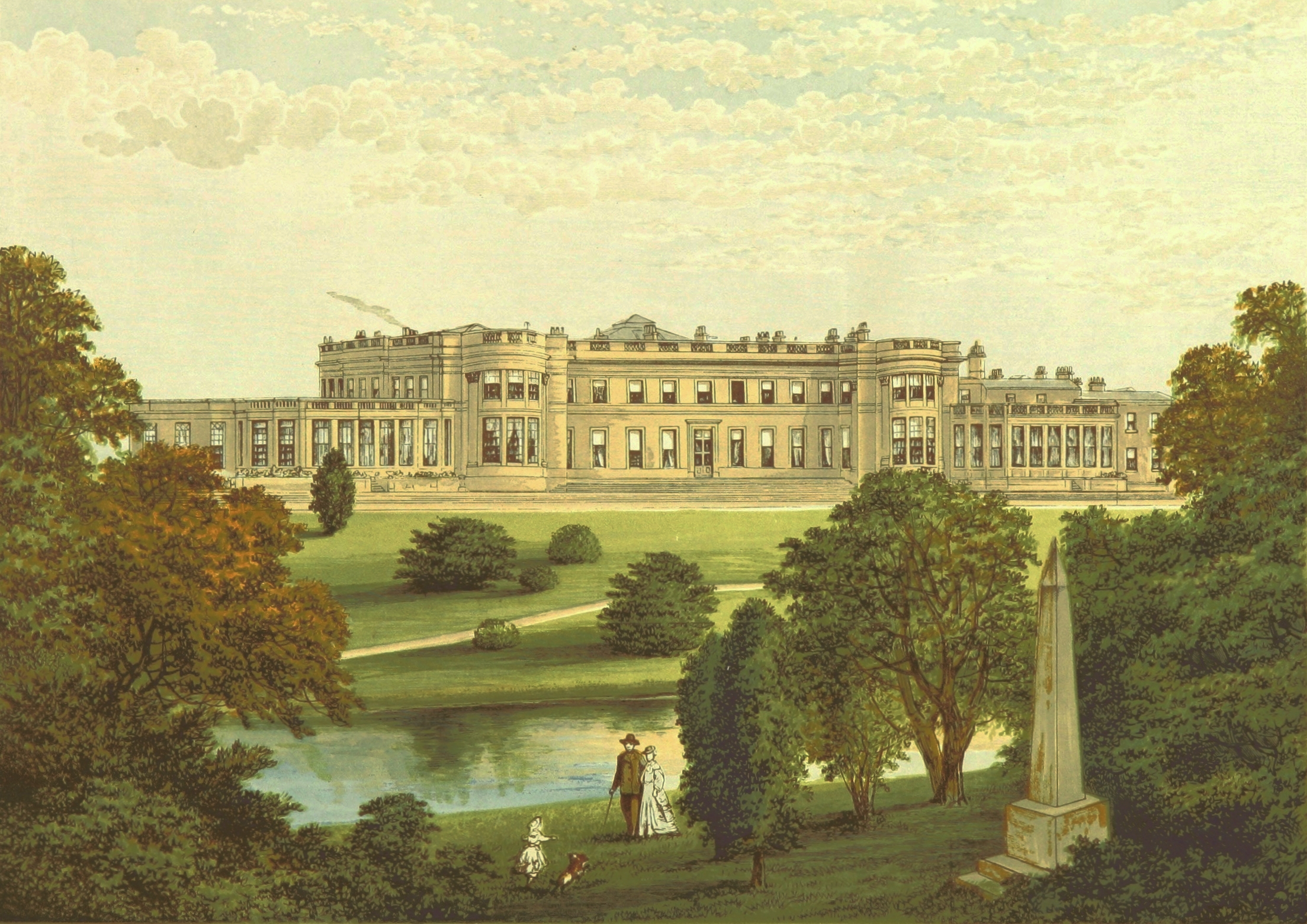
Wynyard Park, c.1880

Lord Londonderry used his new bride's immense wealth to acquire the Seaham Hall estate in County Durham, developing the coalfields there. He also built the harbour at Seaham, to rival nearby Sunderland. He commissioned Benjamin Wyatt to build a mansion at Wynyard Park. It was completed by Philip Wyatt in 1841 and cost £130,000 (equivalent to £10,772,000 in 2016) to build and furnish. Unfortunately, just as the mansion was being completed, a fire broke out and gutted the house; it was later restored and remodelled by Ignatius Bonomi.

The family also used their newfound wealth to redecorate their country seat in Ireland, Mount Stewart, and bought Holdernesse House on London's Park Lane, which they renamed Londonderry House.

== Declines Orange invitation ==
In 1836 the Orange Order was accused of plotting to place Ernest Augustus, Duke of Cumberland and Imperial Grand Master of the Orange Order, on the throne in place of Victoria when his brother King William IV died. Once the plot was revealed, the House of Commons called upon the King to disband the Order. Under pressure from Joseph Hume, William Molesworth and Lord John Russell, the King indicated measures would have to be taken and the Duke of Cumberland was forced to dissolve the Orange lodges.

Hume laid evidence before the House of Commons that the plotters had approached Londonderry. In July 1832, the Marquess had received a letter from Lieutenant-Colonel W. B. Fairman, the Deputy Grand Secretary of the Orange Institution of Great Britain, advising him that following "a death of importance" (the passing of the King) the Orangemen would abandon their policy of "non-resistance" to the present "Popish Cabinet, and democratical Ministry" (the parliamentary reform ministry of Earl Grey) and that "it might be political" for the Marquess to join them. Noting that there were already Orange lodges in Newcastle, South Shields, and Darlington, Fairman also suggested to Londonderry that to assume the role in Durham of County Grand Master might be advantageous to him "in a personal sense": his "pitmen" (the miners employed in his collieries) might be induced to organise lodges among themselves which would "prove a partial check against their entering into cabals [i.e. trade unions] hereafter".

While he conceded that he wished the government should do more to check "the baneful influence of the Liberal and Radical associations", including trade unions, Londonderry went to some length in the House of Lords to deny any possible connection between himself and "the alleged project for altering the succession to the throne". To Fairman he had replied: "the present state of liberal Whig feeling in this very Whig county, and the very refractory and insubordinate state of the pitmen, entirely preclude the possibility of successful efforts at this juncture". He had also spoken with Lord Kenyon (his then house guest, who had led opposition to Catholic Emancipation) and had "no doubt" he would "convince his Royal Highness" (the Duke of Cumberland), as well as Fairman, "that the present moment is not the time when the object can be forwarded."

== Industrialist and landlord ==
=== Mines and Collieries Act ===
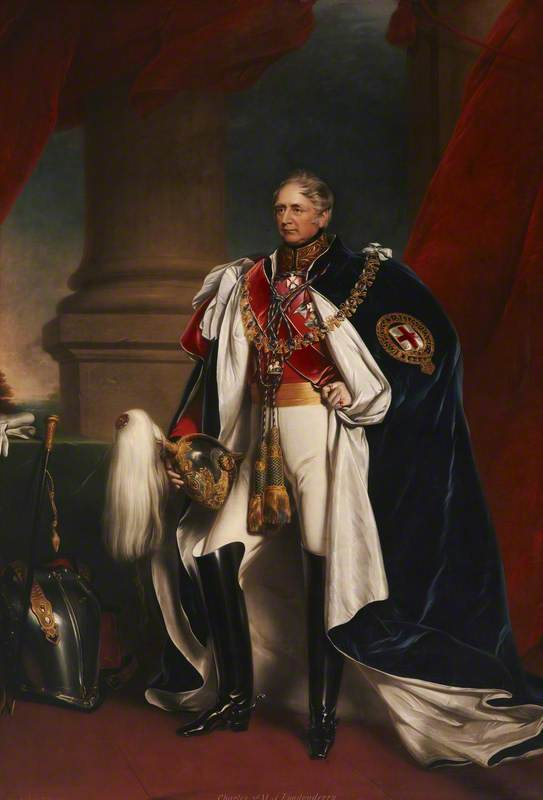
Marquess of Londonderry as a Knight of the Garter, c. 1853–54

Londonderry led the opposition to the Mines and Collieries Act of 1842 in the House of Lords. He is reported to have raged furiously against any attempt to deny the collieries the use of child labour. Speaking on behalf of the Yorkshire Coal-Owners Association, Londonderry said "With respect to the age at which males should be admitted into mines, the members of this association have unanimously agreed to fix it at eight years... In the thin coal mines it is more especially requisite that boys, varying in age from eight to fourteen, should be employed; as the underground roads could not be made of sufficient height for taller persons without incurring an outlay so great as to render the working of such mines unprofitable".

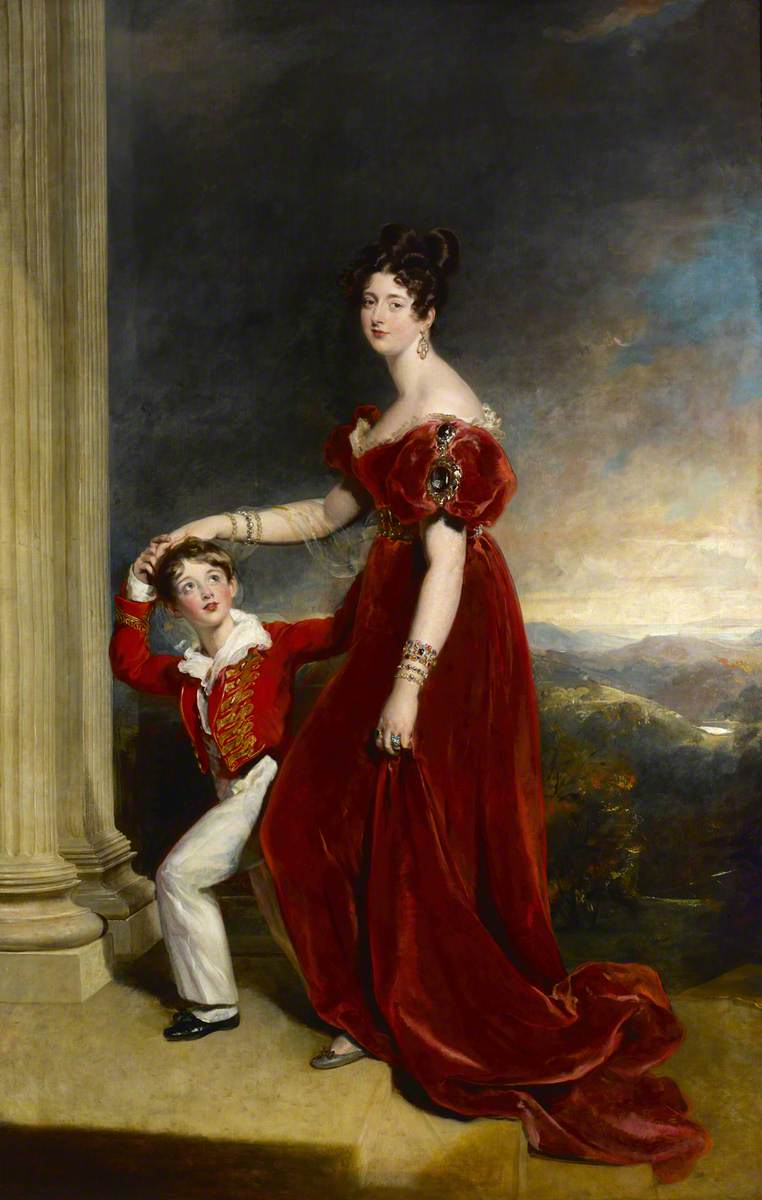
Frances Vane (1800–1865), Marchioness of Londonderry, and her son, George. Thomas Lawrence c. 1828

Londonderry was a major participant in the Limitation of the Vend, a long-standing price fixing combination of north eastern mine owners. He was widely blamed for its eventual collapse.

=== Irish famine ===
By the time of the outbreak of the Great Irish Famine in 1845, Londonderry was one of the ten richest men in the United Kingdom. While many landlords made efforts to mitigate the worst effects of the famine on their tenants, Londonderry was criticised for meanness: he and his wife gave only £30 to the local relief committee but spent £15,000 renovating Mount Stewart, their Irish home.

In contrast to his neighbour, the Marquess of Downshire, he rejected rent reductions (for which he was excoriated by James MacKnight in the Presbyterian weekly, the Banner of Ulster). Invoking the admonitions of the Prime Minister Lord Russell and of his predecessor Sir Robert Peel, he advised his tenants "to help themselves and heaven will help them": only the most "supine and inert" among them could be "suffering in any serious degree under the failure of the potato".

During the tenant right campaign of the early 1850s, Londonderry insisted on his full rights and this alienated many of his tenants. He was in disagreement over this question with his eldest son and heir Frederick, who was more liberally inclined.

=== Napoleon and Abd-el-Kader ===
Back in England, Londonderry befriended Louis-Napoléon Bonaparte (later Napoleon III) while the latter was exiled in London between 1836 and 1840. After Bonaparte had been elected president of France in 1851, Londonderry asked him to free Abd-el-Kader.

=== Late honours ===
Governor of County Londonderry from 1823, Londonderry was appointed Lord Lieutenant of Durham in 1842 and the following year became Colonel of the 2nd Regiment of Life Guards. When Wellington, whom he admired greatly, died in 1852, his place as Knight of the Garter was given to Londonderry, who was officially invested on 19 June 1853.

== Death, memorials, and succession ==
Memorial statue by Raffaelle Monti in Durham

He died on 6 March 1854 at Londonderry House and was buried in Longnewton, County Durham. His widow honoured him by the Londonderry Equestrian Statue in Durham.

Frederick built Scrabo Tower near Newtownards as a monument to the memory of his father. Of the 730 subscribers to the cost, just 450 were connected to the Stewart estate on which there were 1,200 tenants farmers and many associated employees (in 1850, organised in the all-Ireland Tenant Right League, 700 of these tenants had signed an address demanding tenant right and lower rents). Two-thirds of the cost of the tower was met by 98 subscribers (in a list headed by Emperor Napoleon III) most of whom were fellow gentry.*

He was succeeded as Marquess of Londonderry by his eldest son, Frederick Stewart, the only child from his first marriage, and as Earl Vane by George Vane, the eldest son from his second marriage. At Charles's death Frederick, therefore, became the 4th Marquess of Londonderry, whereas George became the 2nd Earl Vane. George was later to become the 5th Marquess after his half-brother had died childless.

Timeline
Age	Date	Event
0	1778, 18 May	Born in Dublin
11	1789, 9 Sep	Father created Baron Londonderry
12	1791, 3 Apr	Joined the army
17	1795, 10 Oct	Father created Viscount Castlereagh
18	1796, 10 Aug	Father created Marquess Londonderry
26	1804, 8 Aug	Married Catherine Bligh.
30	1808, 29 Dec	Excelled at the cavalry engagement of Benavente during the Corunna Campaign
32–33	1811, May	Excelled at Fuentes de Oñoro
33	1812, Feb	Resigned from the army
35–36	1814	Created Baron Stewart
40	1819, 3 Apr	Married Lady Frances Vane-Tempest
41	1820, 29 Jan	Accession of King George IV, succeeding King George III
42	1821, 6 Apr	Father died at Mount Stewart.
44	1822, 12 Aug	Succeeded Castlereagh as the 3rd Marquess of Londonderry
54	1833, 18 Jan	Mother died.
59	1837, 20 Jun	Accession of Queen Victoria, succeeding King William IV
64	1842, Jun–Aug	Opposed the Mines and Collieries Act of 1842 at its readings in the House of Lords
75	1853, 19 Jun	Made a Knight of the Garter
75	1854, 6 Mar	Died in London

=== Styles ===
Charles was styled:

1. The Honourable Charles Stewart from 1789 until 1813 (because his father was created Baron Londonderry in 1789),
2. The Honourable Sir Charles Stewart from 1813 to 1814 (because he was made a Knight of the Bath),
3. The Right Honourable The Lord Stewart from 1814 to 1822 (because he was made a baron in his own right),
4. The Most Honourable The Marquess of Londonderry.

== Works ==
The 3rd Marquess was a prolific writer and editor. He wrote books about his own military and diplomatic career and published many of his half-brother's papers.

=== War memoirs ===
The following two books describe the Napoleonic War as he saw them happen. The first describes his experience of the Peninsular War. The second the War of the Sixth Coalition, which forced Napoleon to abdicate:

- Narrative of the Peninsular War (London: Henry Colburn, 1828) online at Internet Archive
- Narrative of the War in Germany and France: In 1813 and 1814 (London: Henry Colburn and Richard Bentley, 1830) online at Internet Archive

=== Castlereagh papers ===
The 3rd Marquess also compiled, edited, and published many of the papers left by his half-brother and published them in the following twelve volumes, divided in three series.

The first series, consisting of four volumes, numbered 1 – 4, appeared in 1848 and 1849 under the title Memoirs and Correspondence. The volumes are not marked "first series" on the title pages. They are:

- Memoirs and Correspondence of Viscount Castlereagh, Second Marquess of Londonderry, Volume 1 (London: Henry Colburn, 1848) online at Internet Archive - The Irish Rebellion
- Memoirs and Correspondence of Viscount Castlereagh, Second Marquess of Londonderry, Volume 2 (London: Henry Colburn, 1848) online at Internet Archive - Arrangements for a Union
- Memoirs and Correspondence of Viscount Castlereagh, Second Marquess of Londonderry, Volume 3 (London: Henry Colburn, 1849) online at Internet Archive - Completion of the Legislative Union
- Memoirs and Correspondence of Viscount Castlereagh, Second Marquess of Londonderry, Volume 4 (London, Henry Colburn, 1849) online at Internet Archive - Concessions to Catholics and Dissenters: Emmett's Insurrection

The second series, consisting of four volumes, appeared in 1851 under the title Correspondence, Despatches and Other Papers. The volume numbers continue, despite being marked "2nd series" and are therefore 4 to 8. They are:

- Correspondence Despatches and Other Papers of Viscount Castlereagh, Second Marquess of Londonderry, Series 2, Volume 5 (London: William Shoberl, 1851) online at Internet Archive - Military and Miscellaneous
- Correspondence Despatches and Other Papers of Viscount Castlereagh, Second Marquess of Londonderry, Series 2, Volume 6 (London: William Shoberl, 1851) online at Internet Archive - Military and Miscellaneous
- Correspondence Despatches and Other Papers of Viscount Castlereagh, Second Marquess of Londonderry, Series 2, Volume 7 (London: William Shoberl, 1851) online at Internet Archive - Military and Miscellaneous
- Correspondence Despatches and Other Papers of Viscount Castlereagh, Second Marquess of Londonderry, Series 2, Volume 8 (London: William Shoberl, 1851) online at Internet Archive - Military and Miscellaneous

The third series appeared in 1853. The four volumes have the same title as the second series. The volume numbering is irregular. They are:

- Correspondence Despatches and Other Papers of Viscount Castlereagh, Second Marquess of Londonderry, Volume 9 (London: John Murray, 1853) online at Internet Archive - Military and Diplomatic
- Correspondence Despatches and Other Papers of Viscount Castlereagh, Second Marquess of Londonderry, Volume 11 (London: John Murray, 1853) online at HathiTrust
- Correspondence Despatches and Other Papers of Viscount Castlereagh, Second Marquess of Londonderry, Series 3, Volume 3 (London: John Murray, 1853) online at Internet Archive - Military and Diplomatic
- Correspondence Despatches and Other Papers of Viscount Castlereagh, Second Marquess of Londonderry, Volume 12 (London: John Murray, 1853) online at Internet Archive

== See also ==
- Marquess of Londonderry – for his title
- Earl Camden – for his maternal grandfather's title
- Vane-Tempest baronets – for the title of his father-in-law Sir Henry Vane-Tempest

== Notes and references ==
=== Sources ===
- Alison, Archibald (1861a). Lives of Lord Castlereagh and Sir Charles Stewart the second and the third Marquesses of Londonderry. Vol. 1. Edinburgh and London: William Blackwood and Sons. OCLC 456774545.
- Alison, Archibald (1861b). Lives of Lord Castlereagh and Sir Charles Stewart the second and the third Marquesses of Londonderry. Vol. 3. Edinburgh and London: William Blackwood and Sons. OCLC 456774545.
- Burke, Bernard (1869). A Genealogical and Heraldic Dictionary of the Peerage and Baronetage of the British Empire (31st ed.). London: Harrison. OCLC 1045624502.
- Burke, Bernard; Burke, Ashworth P. (1909). A Genealogical and Heraldic History of the Peerage and Baronetage, the Privy Council, Knightage and Companionage (71st ed.). London: Harrison. OCLC 28297274.
- Burke, Bernard (1949). A Genealogical and Heraldic Dictionary of the Peerage and Baronetage of the British Empire (99th ed.). London: Burke's Peerage Ltd.
- Cobden, John C. (1853). The White Slaves of England. Auburn [N.Y.] and Buffalo: Miller, Orton and Maulligan. OCLC 697840371.
- Cokayne, George Edward (1893). Complete peerage of England, Scotland, Ireland, Great Britain and the United Kingdom, extant, extinct, or dormant. Vol. V (1st ed.). London: George Bell and Sons. OCLC 1180836840. – L to M
- Debrett, John (1838). Courthope, William (ed.). Debrett's Complete Peerage of the United Kingdom of Great Britain and Ireland (22nd ed.). London: F. C. and J. Rivington. OCLC 315551200. – (later events)
- Fryde, Edmund Boleslaw; Greenway, D. E.; Porter, S.; Roy, I., eds. (1986). Handbook of British Chronology. Royal Historical Society Guides and Handbooks, No. 2 (3rd ed.). London: Offices of the Royal Historical Society. ISBN 0-86193-106-8. – (for timeline)
- House of Commons (1878). Return. Members of Parliament – Part II. Parliaments of Great Britain, 1705–1796. Parliaments of the United Kingdom, 1801–1874. Parliaments and Conventions of the Estates of Scotland, 1357–1707. Parliaments of Ireland, 1599–1800. London: His/Her Majesty's Stationery Office. OCLC 13112546.
- Hugo, Abel (1838). France militaire: histoire des armées françaises de terre et de mer de 1792 à 1837 (in French). Vol. 4. Paris: Delloye. OCLC 23429738.
- Jennings, Louis J. (1885). The Croker Papers. The correspondence and Diary of the Late Right Honourable John Wilson Croker LL.D., FRS, Secretary to the Admiralty from 1809 to 1830. London: John Murray. OCLC 1042993826.
- Kinealy, Christine (2013). Charity and the Great Hunger in Ireland: The Kindness of the Strangers. London: Bloomsbury Publishing. ISBN 978-1-4411-1758-8.
- Kornitzer, Margaret (1952). Child Adoption in the Modern World. New York: Putnam. ISBN 978-0-8022-0885-9.
- Lloyd, Ernest Marsh (1898). "Stewart, Charles William third Marquis of Londonderry". In Lee, Sidney (ed.). Dictionary of National Biography. Vol. LIV. London: Smith, Elder, & Co. pp. 278–281. OCLC 8544105.
- Lloyd, Ernest Marsh; Heesom, A. J. (2004). "Vane, Charles William, third marquess of Londonderry (1778–1854)". In Matthew, Colin; Harrison, Brian (eds.). Oxford Dictionary of National Biography. Vol. 56. New York: Oxford University Press. pp. 95–98. ISBN 0-19-861406-3.
- Oman, Charles (1913). Wellington's Army, 1809-1814. New York: Longmans, Green, and Co. OCLC 1158335402.
- Urquhart, Diane (2007). The Ladies of Londonderry: Women and Political Patronage. London: I. B. Tauris. ISBN 978-1-84511-410-7.
- Vane, Charles William (1828). Narrative of the Peninsular War from 1808 to 1813. London: Henry Colburn. OCLC 755719969.
- Zamoyski, Adam (2007). Rites of Peace, the Fall of Napoleon & the Congress of Vienna. London: HarperCollins. ISBN 978-0-06-077518-6.

Parliament of Ireland
Preceded by George Dunbar; James Kearney	Member of Parliament for Thomastown; March–May 1800; With: James Kearney March–April 1800; William Gardiner April–May 1800	Succeeded by William Gardiner; John Francis Cradock
Preceded by Thomas Conolly; The Earl of Tyrone	Member of Parliament for County Londonderry; 1800–1801; With: The Earl of Tyrone	Succeeded by Parliament of the United Kingdom
Parliament of the United Kingdom
New constituency	Member of Parliament for Londonderry; 1801–1814; With: Sir George Hill, 2nd Bt 1801–1802; Lord George Thomas Beresford 1802–1812; Hon. William Ponsonby 1812–1814	Succeeded by Hon. William Ponsonby; Alexander Stewart
Military offices
Preceded by Richard Wilford	Colonel of the 25th Light Dragoons; 1813–1818	Regiment disbanded
Preceded by George, Prince of Wales	Colonel of the 10th (The Prince of Wales's Own); Royal Regiment of (Light) Dragoons (Hussars); 1820–1843	Succeeded by The Earl Beauchamp
Preceded by The Earl Cathcart	Colonel of the 2nd Regiment of Life Guards; 1843–1854	Succeeded by The Lord Seaton
Political offices
Preceded by Sir George Shee, Bt; Sir James Cockburn, Bt	Under-Secretary of State for War and the Colonies; 1807–1809; With: E. Cooke	Succeeded by Hon. F. J. Robinson; Hon. Charles Jenkinson
Diplomatic posts
Preceded by No representation due to the Treaties of Tilsit (previously John Frere)	British Minister to Prussia; 1813–1814	Succeeded by George Henry Rose
Preceded by The Earl of Aberdeen	British Ambassador to Austria; 1814–1823	Succeeded by Hon. Sir Henry Wellesley
Honorary titles
Preceded by The Duke of Cleveland	Lord Lieutenant of Durham; 1842–1854	Succeeded by The Earl of Durham
Peerage of Ireland
Preceded by Robert Stewart	Marquess of Londonderry; 1822–1854	Succeeded by Frederick Stewart
Peerage of the United Kingdom
New creation	Earl Vane; 1823–1854	Succeeded by George Vane-Tempest
New creation	Baron Stewart; 1814–1854	Succeeded by George Vane-Tempest
