= Robert Stewart, 1st Marquess of Londonderry =

Late 18th and early 19th-century Irish marquess

The Most Honourable The Marquess of Londonderry PC (Ire)
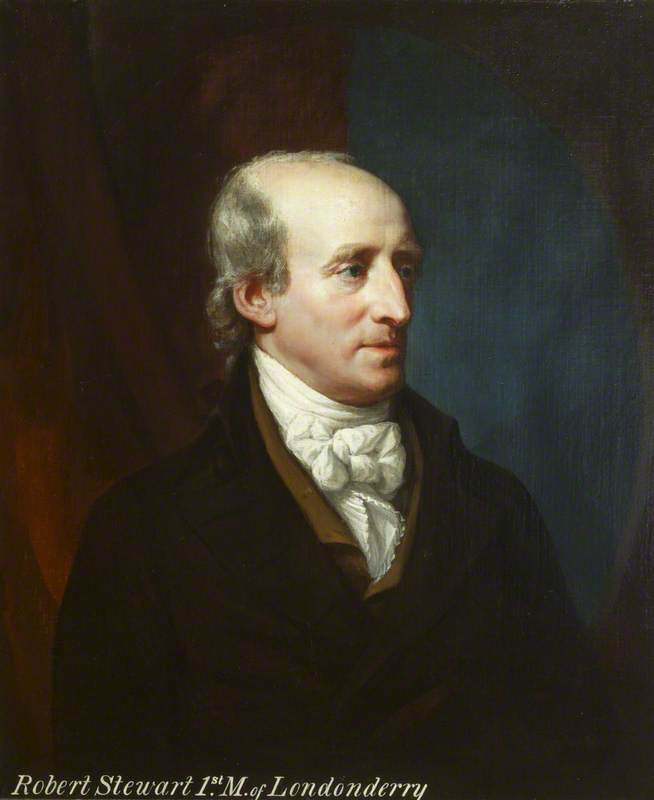
- The Marquess of Londonderry, by Hugh Douglas Hamilton, c. 1800–1808
- Tenure: 1816–1821
- Successor: Robert, 2nd Marquess
- Born: 27 September 1739; Mount Stewart, County Down, Ireland
- Died: 6 April 1821 (aged 81); Mount Stewart, County Down, Ireland
- Buried: Newtownards Priory
- Spouses: Sarah Frances Seymour (m. 1766; died 1770) Frances Pratt (m. 1775)
- Issue Detail: Robert, Charles, & others
- Father: Alexander Stewart
- Mother: Mary Cowan

Robert Stewart, 1st Marquess of Londonderry (27 September 1739 – 6 April 1821), was a County Down landowner, Irish Volunteer, and member of the Irish Parliament who, exceptionally for an Ulster Scot and Presbyterian, rose within the ranks of Ireland's Anglican "Protestant Ascendancy." His success was fuelled by wealth acquired through judicious marriages, and by the advancing political career of his son, Viscount Castlereagh (an architect of the Acts of Union, and British Foreign Secretary). In 1798 he gained notoriety for refusing to intercede on behalf of James Porter, his local Presbyterian minister, executed outside the Stewart demesne as a rebel.

== Birth and origins ==
Robert was born on 27 September 1739, at Mount Stewart, the eldest son of Alexander Stewart and his wife Mary Cowan. His father was an alderman of Derry in 1760, and his grandfather, Colonel William Stewart, had commanded one of the two companies of Protestant soldiers that Derry admitted within its walls when Mountjoy was sent there by Tyrconnell before the start of the siege. Robert's mother was a daughter of John Cowan, also an alderman of that same town. His parents had married on 30 June 1737 in Dublin.

Family tree

Robert Stewart with his two wives, his parents, and other selected relatives. (Note: This family tree is based on the genealogies of the marquesses of Londonderry. Also see the lists of siblings and children in the text.) His mother inherited Robert Cowan's fortune.

William; Stewart; Colonel	John; Cowan d. 1733
Alexander; 1699–1781	Mary; Cowan d. 1788	Robert; Cowan d. 1737; Bombay; Governor
Sarah; Frances; Seymour- Conway; 1747–1770	Robert; 1st Marquess; 1739–1821	Frances; Pratt c. 1751 – 1833
Castlereagh; 2nd Marquess; 1769–1822	Catherine; Bligh d. 1812	Charles; 3rd Marquess; 1778–1854	Frances; Vane; 1800–1865
Frederick; 4th Marquess; 1805–1872	George; 5th Marquess; 1821–1884

Legend

XXX	Subject of the article	XXX	Robert; Cowan	XXX	Marquesses of Londonderry

Robert listed among his siblings
He appears among his siblings as the second child:
1. Anne (1738–1781)
2. Robert (1739–1821)
3. William (1741–1742)
4. Francis (born 1742)
5. John (1744–1762)
6. Alexander (1746–1831), married Mary Moore, the 3rd daughter of the 1st Marquess of Drogheda
7. Mary (born 1747), died young

== Cowan inheritance ==
Within three months of his parents' marriage in 1737, Robert's mother inherited the fortune her half-brother, Robert Cowan, had acquired in service to the East India Company as Governor of Bombay. The legacy allowed Alexander Stewart to retire from the linen trade and buy into the landed gentry. In 1743 he purchased sixty townlands and a large estate from the Colville family at Newtownards and Comber in County Down.

== Education and first marriage ==
Robert Stewart was brought up a Calvinist, and was sent by his father under the care of a tutor to the University of Geneva, where he studied literature. He thus avoided the "temptations of Oxford and similar academic strongholds of the Established Church" to which, as the son landed gentry, he might naturally have been drawn.

On his return from the continent, he courted Lady Sarah Frances Seymour-Conway (whose niece, Mary Moore, married Robert's brother Alexander in 1791). Lady Sarah Frances Seymour-Conway's father, Francis Seymour-Conway, 1st Marquess of Hertford, owned considerable property in the neighbourhood of Lisburn, and in 1765 was appointed Lord Lieutenant of Ireland. Robert Stewart attended the viceregal court in Dublin, where he successfully pressed his suit. The marriage took place in the Chapel Royal of Dublin Castle, and Lord Hertford housed the new couple in the city.

Robert and Sarah had two sons:

1. Alexander-Francis, who died within his first year
2. Robert (1769–1822), later to be known as "Castlereagh", the famous statesman

Lady Sarah died in childbirth in 1770.

== Opposition member of parliament ==
The year following his wife's death Robert Stewart entered the Irish House of Commons as member for County Down filling a vacancy created by the elevation of Bernard Ward to the House of Lords as Baron Bangor. He was returned by the "independent" or "county" interest backed by the local Whigs and by his fellow Presbyterians ("Dissenters" from the Established Church who were a majority among the county's exceptionally high number of freeholder voters). Their discomforted rivals were the "official" or "court" party of the Earl of Hillsborough, the county's Lord-Lieutenant and largest proprietor.

This political triumph over the interests of an Ascendancy family which had hitherto returned both county members to the Irish House of Commons formed the prelude of a long period of rivalry. Robert Stewart's initial success was largely due to popular sympathy with John Wilkes and the discontented American colonists, and to the growing feelings in favour of constitutional and parliamentary reform which found expression in the Volunteer movement.

He proved a consistent antagonist of the administration, invariably voting and sometimes speaking for the Opposition in the House. His early political conduct won the approval of his constituents. A dinner at which they entertained in Belfast was marked by toasts "liberal in quality as in quantity", including to "The memory of John Hampden" (who had led parliamentary opposition to Charles I), and to "All those who would rather die in jack-boots than live in wooden shoes".

== Second marriage and children ==
Robert Stewart remarried, on 7 June 1775, taking for his second wife, Frances Pratt, the independent-minded daughter of the Whig politician Charles Pratt, 1st Earl Camden.

From his second marriage he had 11 more children, three sons and eight daughters:

1. Charles William (1778–1854), succeeded him as 3rd Marquess
2. Frances Ann (1777–1810), married Lord Charles Fitzroy
3. Elizabeth Mary (1779–1798)
4. Caroline (1781–1860), married Col. Thomas Wood, MP for Breconshire
5. Alexander John (1783–1800)
6. Georgiana (1785–1804), married the politician George Canning, 1st Baron Garvagh, nephew of army general and politician Sir Brent Spencer
7. Selina Sarah Juliana (1786–1871), David Guardi Ker, MP for Downpatrick
8. Matilda Charlotte (1787–1842), married Edward Michael Ward, the eldest son of the Robert Ward of Bangor
9. Emily Jane (1789–1865), married firstly John James, son of Sir Walter James, 1st Baronet, and secondly Henry Hardinge, 1st Viscount Hardinge
10. Thomas Henry (1790–1810)
11. Octavia (1792–1819), married Edward Law, 1st Earl of Ellenborough

== Irish Volunteer ==
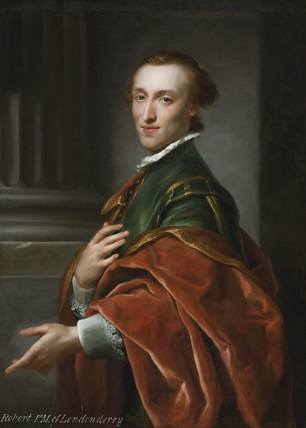
Robert Stewart by Anton Raphael Mengs, c. 1760–1776

Between 1775 and 1783, Robert Stewart lived in Bangor with his wife, while his father was living at Mount Stewart.

In 1776, a general election was held in Ireland. Robert Stewart stood again for Down and was re-elected. He sat until the dissolution of this parliament on 25 July 1783.

Stewart participated in the Irish Volunteers, the self-armed militia ostensibly formed to maintain order and defend Ireland while the Crown and its forces were distracted by the American War. Following the raid on Belfast Lough by the American privateer John Paul Jones in April 1778, Stewart organised a volunteer company in Newtownards of 115 men, the Arms Independents, to act as fencibles. Like other Volunteer companies, they were soon engaged in patriotic debate.

After his father died in April 1781, moved to the family seat, Mount Stewart, near Newtownards (where in the park he completed the Temple of the Winds). On 17 September 1782 he was sworn in as Irish Privy Councillor.

That very same month as Colonel Stewart he was elected president of the second Ulster (overwhelmingly Presbyterian) Volunteer Convention in Dungannon.

Anticipating a "grand national convention" called for Dublin in November, it notably failed to broaden the front against the Ascendancy. Resolutions in support of Catholic enfranchisement were rejected.

In the general election of October Stewart stood again for County Down but the Ascendancy families triumphed, one seat taken by Arthur Hill, the son of the Earl of Downshire, the other by Lord Bangor's son, Edward Ward. Stewart unsuccessfully challenged the returns at the bar of the House of Commons claiming irregularities. Downshire's influence was able to procure the dismissal of his petition with costs".

At the Dublin convention, Stewart was appointed chairman of the committee "for the receiving and digesting plans of reform". But the convention tactic did not succeed as in 1782, when the massed ranks of the Volunteers had helped secure Irish legislative independence. The digested bill, presented by Henry Flood, which would have abolished the proprietary boroughs (with which their Ascendancy rivals, but not the Stewarts, were endowed) and extended the vote to a broader class of Protestant freeholders was rejected. Having accepted defeat in America, Britain could again spare troops for Ireland, and neither parliament nor Dublin Castle would again be intimidated.

Although he believed that the demands of Dissenters for greater representation should have been met so as to dissuade them from pushing Catholic claims along with their own, Stewart joined his friend, president of the convention, the Earl of Charlemont in urging the Volunteers to receive their rebuff quietly.

== Ascendant peer ==
In 1789 Robert Stewart was created Baron Londonderry in the Peerage of Ireland. Unable as a peer to himself avenge his defeat in 1783, for general election of 1790 he took his eldest son, Robert, out of Cambridge University to run for the county. Still able to persuade Down's Forty-shilling freeholders that the Stewarts were the friends of reform, the younger Stewart did so successfully albeit at considerable expense to his father.

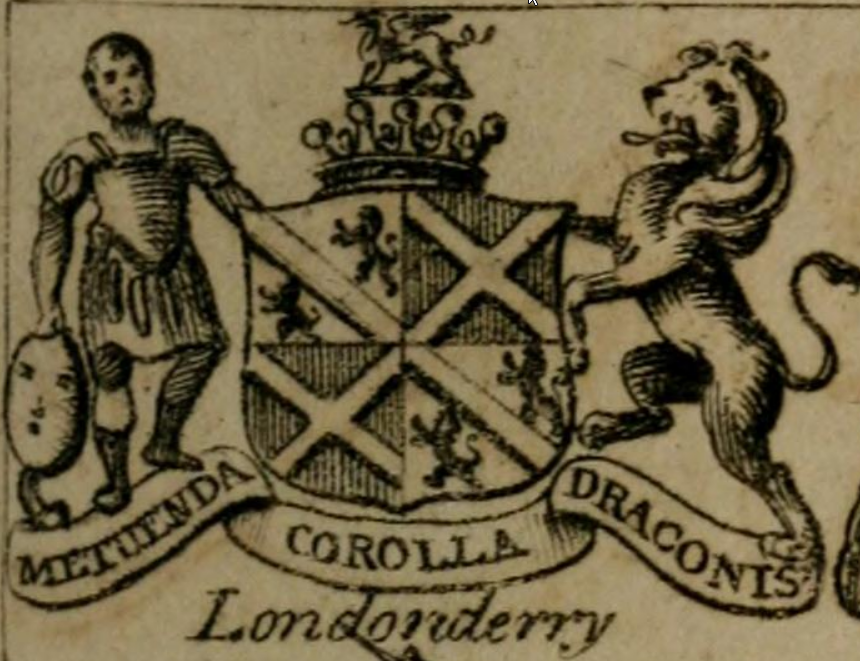
The arms of Robert Stewart, Earl of Londonderry The Stewart arms are quartered with the Cowan saltires. (Note: White saltires on red ground appear on armorial plates of Chinese manufacture linked to Robert Cowan, preserved in the National Trust collection at Mount Stewart.)

Stewart deserted Presbyterianism for the Established Church, at what point is unclear but likely in advance of his elevation in 1795 to Viscount Castlereagh and the following year to Earl of Londonderry. His eldest son, now Viscount Castlereagh, also quietly converted to Anglicanism and was appointed Chief Secretary for Ireland to serve under Lady Frances's brother, Earl Camden, the Lord Lieutenant. Londonderry's second son, Charles, meanwhile kept the family present in the Irish Commons as member for Thomastown borough, County Kilkenny. Banking on these new establishment connections, and alarmed by the evident disaffection of their tenantry, Stewart reached an accommodation with the Hills: the families in future would divide the two county seats in Down, each returning a nominee to the parliament in Dublin unopposed.

Following a theft of gunpowder and grapeshot in Donaghdee, on 26 September 1796, Londonderry summoned his tenants to Mount Stewart to compel them to swear as oath of allegiance. To the extent that he and his sons were prepared to consider reform, including further rights for Catholics, it was now to be within the more secure context of a union with Great Britain. When in 1799 the parliament in Dublin rejected the bill for the Union they fought to have it re-presented.

With the bill's final passage, in 1801, Londonderry become one of the 28 original Irish representative peers in the new United Kingdom parliament at Westminster. In 1816, thanks to the advancing career of Castlereagh as Foreign Secretary, he was further elevated to Marquess of Londonderry. He thus achieved the rare feat of rising from a "Dissenting" (Presbyterian) commoner into the highest ranks of the Irish aristocracy.

== 1798, the execution of James Porter ==
During their three-day "Republic" in Ards and north Down, 10–13 June 1798, the United Irish insurgents briefly occupied Mount Stewart. In August, the wife of the local Presbyterian minister, James Porter, appeared at the house with her seven children where they overwhelmed Lady Londonderry and young sister, then dying of tuberculosis, with a plea for his life. One of the children was later to recount that when Londonderry discovered his wife composing a letter to General Nugent, he insisted she add a postscript: "L does not allow me to interfere in Mr Porter's case. I cannot, therefore, and beg not to be mentioned. I only send the letter to gratify the humour", i.e. to placate the distraught Mrs Porter to whom, with a smile that filed her with "much horror", Londonderry then handed the letter.

Londonderry was himself present at the court martial, which had accepted dubious testimony to the minister's presence among the rebels, and was to see the sentence executed. Porter was hanged in sight both of his own meeting house at Greyabbey and of his family home (with Stewart tenants reportedly defying their landlord's wish that they attend). The Presbyterian minister Rev. Henry Montgomery of Killead, County Antrim, would later describe the circumstances of Porter's execution as being of "extreme cruelty towards both himself and his family, which were altogether unnecessary for any purpose of public example".

Londonderry was content that other offenders should be allowed exile. David Bailie Warden who commanded north Down rebels in the field; the Reverend Thomas Ledlie Birch, a United Irish firebrand who rallied with the rebels after the Battle of Saintfield; and William Sinclair who joined the tenantry in swearing loyalty before Londonderry yet served on the rebel Committee of Public Safety, were all permitted passage to the United States.

Porter's offence may have been his popular satire of the local landed interest, Billy Bluff, in which the master of Mount Stewart is clearly recognisable as the inarticulate tyrant "Lord Mountmumble". Porter had been aware that Billy Bluff might not go unpunished, acknowledging in its preface: "I am in danger of being hanged or put in gaol, perhaps both".

It may also be that Londonderry believed that Porter, who had been close to the family (their election agent and a frequent visitor to the Mount Stewart), had been a source of his wife's wayward, and potentially compromising, political sympathies. Lady Frances is rumoured to have continued to send privately for Porter's offending paper, the Northern Star, and in correspondence with Jane Greg (reputedly "head of the [United Irish] Female Societies" in Belfast) made bold to identify herself as a "republican countess".

Local tradition has it that Mrs. Porter waylaid his lordship's carriage, in a vain hope of prevailing by a further direct entreaty, but Londonderry bade the coachman "drive on." The sentence, however, was mitigated by remission of the order for quartering.

== Reputation as landlord ==
Despite political differences with his tenants, Londonderry had a reputation as a comparatively generous landlord. He and his father rarely evicted tenants unless they were more than five years in arrears, and they abided by the Ulster custom of tenant right. They patronised the local town of Newtownards raising a subscription for a Catholic primary school as a gesture of ecumenical good will, and building a market house with a striking clock tower (occupied in 1798 by Scottish Fencibles, the building was attacked by rebels under Warden's command). During food shortages in 1800 and 1801, Londonderry at his own expense imported provisions into the stricken districts.

== Death, succession, and timeline ==
Lord Londonderry died on 6 April 1821 at Mount Stewart, County Down, and was buried at the Newtownards Priory, where his father already had been laid to rest. He was succeeded briefly as the 2nd Marquess of Londonderry by his eldest son Robert (Castlereagh) who took his own life the following year.

Timeline
Age	Date	Event
0	1739, 27 Sep	Born at Mount Stewart
21	1760, 25 Oct	Accession of King George III, succeeding King George II
26	1766, 3 Jun	Married his 1st wife
30	1770, 17 Jul	First wife died in childbirth
31–32	1771	Elected MP for County Down in the Irish Parliament
35	1775, Jun	Married his 2nd wife
36–37	1776	Re-elected MP for County Down in the Irish Parliament
41	1781, 2 Apr	Father died
42	1782, 17 Sep	Made an Irish Privy Councillor
43–44	1783	Electoral defeat against Arthur Hill and Edward Ward
49	1789, 9 Sep	Created Baron Londonderry
50–51	1790	Eldest son elected MP for Down
56	1795, 10 Oct	Created Viscount Castlereagh
56	1796, 10 Aug	Created Earl Londonderry
76	1816, 13 Jan	Created Marquess of Londonderry
80	1820, 29 Jan	Accession of King George IV, succeeding King George III
81	1821, 6 Apr	Died at Mount Stewart

== Notes and references ==
=== Sources ===
- Alison, Archibald (1861). Lives of Lord Castlereagh and Sir Charles Stewart the second and the third Marquesses of Londonderry. Vol. 1. Edinburgh and London: William Blackwood and Sons. OCLC 456774545.
- Bew, John (2012). Castlereagh: A Life. London: Oxford University Press. ISBN 978-0-19-993159-0. – Snippet view
- Burke, Bernard; Burke, Ashworth P. (1909). A Genealogical and Heraldic History of the Peerage and Baronetage, the Privy Council, Knightage and Companionage (71st ed.). London: Harrison. OCLC 28297274.
- Burke, Bernard (1949). A Genealogical and Heraldic Dictionary of the Peerage and Baronetage of the British Empire (99th ed.). London: Burke's Peerage Ltd.
- Cokayne, George Edward (1893). The complete peerage of England, Scotland, Ireland, Great Britain and the United Kingdom, extant, extinct, or dormant. Vol. 5 (1st ed.). London: George Bell and Sons. OCLC 1180836840. – L to M
- Courtney, Roger (2013). Dissenting Voices: Rediscovering the Irish Progressive Presbyterian Tradition. Belfast: Ulster Historical Foundation. ISBN 978-1-909556-06-5.
- Debrett, John (1808). Peerage of England, Scotland, and Ireland. Vol. 2 (6th ed.). London: F. C. and J. Rivington. OCLC 550538579. – Ireland and Scotland (for the drawing of the arms)
- Debrett, John (1828). Peerage of the United Kingdom of Great Britain and Ireland. Vol. 2 (17th ed.). London: F. C. and J. Rivington. – Scotland and Ireland
- Debrett, John (1838). Courthope, William (ed.). Debrett's Complete Peerage of the United Kingdom of Great Britain and Ireland (22nd ed.). London: F. C. and J. Rivington. OCLC 315551200. (later events)
- Fryde, E. B.; Greenway, D. E.; Porter, S.; Roy, I., eds. (1986). Handbook of British Chronology. Royal Historical Society Guides and Handbooks, No. 2 (3rd ed.). London: Offices of the Royal Historical Society. ISBN 0-86193-106-8. – (for timeline)
- Gilmore, Peter; Parkhill, Trevor; Roulston, William (2018). Exiles of '98: Ulster Presbyterian and the United States (PDF). Belfast: Ulster Historical Foundation. ISBN 978-1-909556-62-1. Archived from the original (PDF) on 30 April 2021.
- Hamilton, John Andrew (1898). "Stewart, Robert, first Marquis of Londonderry". In Lee, Sidney (ed.). Dictionary of National Biography. Vol. 54. London: Smith, Elder, & Co. pp. 345–346. OCLC 8544105.
- House of Commons (1878). Return. Members of Parliament – Part II. Parliaments of Great Britain, 1705–1796. Parliaments of the United Kingdom, 1801–1874. Parliaments and Conventions of the Estates of Scotland, 1357–1707. Parliaments of Ireland, 1599–1800. London: His/Her Majesty's Stationery Office. OCLC 13112546. – (the subject as MP)
- Lodge, John (1789). Archdall, Mervyn (ed.). The Peerage of Ireland or, A Genealogical History of the Present Nobility of that Kingdom. Vol. 6. Dublin: James Moore. OCLC 264906028. – Viscounts, barons (for Bernard Ward, 1st Viscount Bangor)
- McClelland, Aiken (1964). "Thomas Ledlie Birch, United Irishman" (PDF). Belfast Natural History and Philosophical Society (Sessions 161/62-1963/64). 2nd. 7: 24–35.
- Porter, James (1991) [1st pub. 1796]. Clifford, Brendan (ed.). Billy Bluff and the Squire [1796] and Other Writing by Rev. James Porter. Belfast: Athol Books. ISBN 978-0-85034-045-7.
- Rayment, Leigh. "Irish House of Commons 1692–1800". Archived from the original on 1 June 2009. "Down County: 1771 / Robert Stewart, later [1816] 1st Marquess of Londonderry (to 1783)"
- Teggins, Edward Owen (2020). The East India Company Career of Sir Robert Cowan in Bombay and the western Indian Ocean c. 1719–35 (PDF) (PhD). Dublin: Trinity College. – (PDF downloadable from given URL)
- Thorne, Roland; Hamilton, J. A. (2004). "Stewart, Robert, first marquess of Londonderry". In Matthew, Colin; Harrison, Brian (eds.). Oxford Dictionary of National Biography. Vol. 52. New York: Oxford University Press. pp. 748–749. ISBN 0-19-861402-0.
- Waters, Ormonde D. P. (1990). "The Rev. James Porter Dissenting Minister of Greyabbey, 1753–1798". Seanchas Ardmhacha: Journal of the Armagh Diocesan Historical Society. 14 (1): 80–101. doi:10.2307/29742440. ISSN 0488-0196. JSTOR 29742440.
- Watson, I. B. (2004). "Cowan, Sir Robert (d.1737)". In Matthew, Colin; Harrison, Brian (eds.). Oxford Dictionary of National Biography. Vol. 13. New York: Oxford University Press. pp. 752–753. ISBN 0-19-861363-6.

Parliament of Ireland
Preceded by Roger Hall; Bernard Ward	Member of Parliament for County Down; 1771–1783; With: Roger Hall 1771–1776; Arthur Hill, Viscount Kilwarlin 1776–1783	Succeeded by Arthur Hill, Viscount Kilwarlin; Hon. Edward Ward
Parliament of the United Kingdom
New title	Representative peer for Ireland; 1800–1821	Succeeded by The Viscount Powerscourt
Peerage of Ireland
New creation	Marquess of Londonderry; 1816–1821	Succeeded by Robert Stewart
New creation	Earl of Londonderry; 1796–1821	Succeeded by Robert Stewart
New creation	Viscount Castlereagh; 1795–1821	Succeeded by Robert Stewart
New creation	Baron Londonderry; 1789–1821	Succeeded by Robert Stewart
