= Citizen Clem =

2016 biography of Clement Attlee, written by John Bew

- First edition
- Author: John Bew
- Publisher: Quercus Books
- ISBN: 978-1-78087-992-5

Citizen Clem is a 2016 biography of Clement Attlee by John Bew.

== Reception ==
In 2017, Citizen Clem won the Orwell Prize and Elizabeth Longford Prize.

John Kampfner described the novel as an 'exemplary biography'.

Citizen Clem includes several discussions of Attlee's reading habits.
