= George Robert Dawson =

Anglo-Irish Tory politician

The Right Honourable George Robert Dawson

Financial Secretary to the Treasury
- In office 28 January 1830 – 24 November 1830
- Monarchs: George IV; William IV
- Prime Minister: The Duke of Wellington
- Preceded by: Thomas Frankland Lewis
- Succeeded by: Thomas Spring Rice

Personal details
- Born: 24 December 1790 Castledawson, County Londonderry
- Died: 3 April 1856 (aged 65)
- Party: Tory
- Spouse: Mary Peel
- Education: Christ Church, Oxford

George Robert Dawson (24 December 1790 – 3 April 1856), was an Anglo-Irish Tory politician.

== Background and education ==
Dawson was born at Castledawson, County Londonderry, Ireland, the son of Arthur Dawson, who represented Banagher, Midleton and Newtownards in the Irish Parliament, and Catherine Tyrone. He was educated at Harrow and Christ Church, Oxford, where he became friends with Robert Peel, whose sister Dawson later married. He was called to the Bar at Lincoln's Inn in 1811.

== Political career ==
In 1812 Dawson served as Peel's private secretary during Peel's tenure as Chief Secretary for Ireland. He was elected member of parliament for County Londonderry in 1815, upon the death of the incumbent Member, William Ponsonby. He served under Lord Liverpool as Under-Secretary of State for the Home Department from 1822 to 1827 and under the Duke of Wellington as Financial Secretary to the Treasury from 1828 to 1830. In 1830 he was returned to Parliament for Harwich, a seat he held for two years, and sworn of the Privy Council. He again held office as First Secretary of the Admiralty under Peel from 1834 to 1835. From 1841 to 1850 he served as Commissioner and Deputy Chairman of Customs.

At Derry, in 1828, Dawson made an important speech in which he advocated Catholic emancipation; the following year, under the Tory government of the Duke of Wellington, the Roman Catholic Relief Act 1829 was made law.

== Family ==
Dawson married Mary Peel, daughter of Sir Robert Peel, 1st Baronet, on 9 January 1816. He died in 1856 leaving five children, including Robert Peel Dawson, also an MP.

== Arms ==
Coat of arms of George Robert Dawson

Notes
Posthumously confirmed to him 28 August 1929.
Crest
An estoile of six points Or.
Escutcheon
Azure on a bend Or three daws Gules.
Motto
Toujours Propice

Parliament of the United Kingdom
Preceded by Hon. William Ponsonby; Alexander Stewart	Member of Parliament for County Londonderry; 1815–1830; With: Alexander Stewart 1815–1818; Alexander Robert Stewart 1818–1830	Succeeded by Theobald Jones; Sir Robert Bateson, Bt
Preceded by J. C. Herries; Sir William Rae, Bt	Member of Parliament for Harwich; 1830–1832; With: J. C. Herries	Succeeded by J. C. Herries; Christopher Thomas Tower
Political offices
Preceded by Henry Clive	Under-Secretary of State for the Home Department; 1822–1827	Succeeded by Spencer Perceval
Preceded by Thomas Frankland Lewis	Financial Secretary to the Treasury; 1828–1830	Succeeded by Thomas Spring Rice
Preceded by George Elliot	First Secretary of the Admiralty; 1834–1835	Succeeded by Charles Wood
