= William Ponsonby (British Army officer) =

British Army officer and politician

Major-General The Honourable Sir William Ponsonby KCB
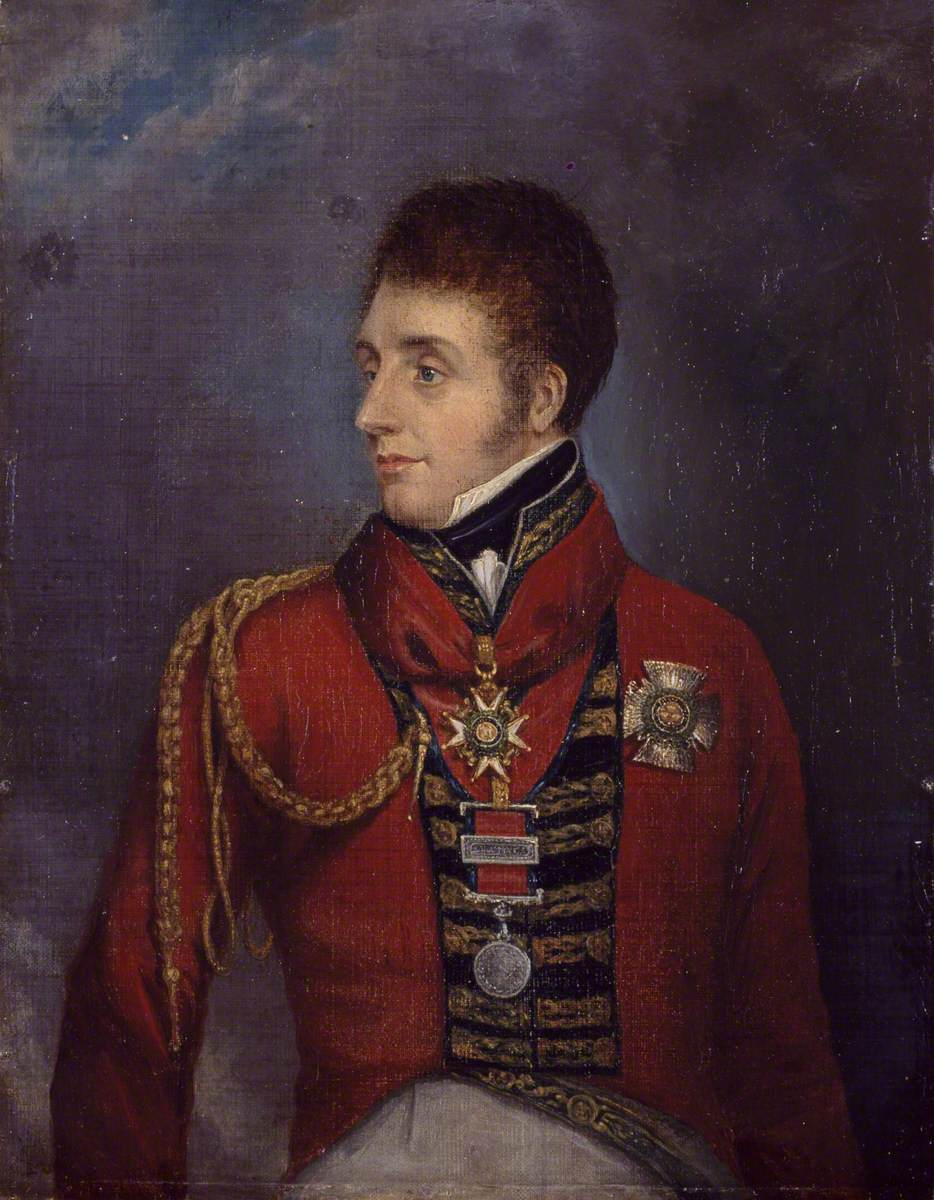
- 1817 portrait

Member of Parliament for Londonderry
- In office 1812–1815
- Preceded by: Lord George Thomas Beresford
- Succeeded by: George Robert Dawson

Personal details
- Born: 13 October 1772 Ireland
- Died: 18 June 1815 (aged 42) Waterloo, Belgium
- Cause of death: Killed in action
- Spouse: Georgiana FitzRoy

Military service
- Allegiance: Great Britain; United Kingdom
- Branch/service: British Army
- Years of service: 1794–1815
- Rank: Major general
- Unit: 5th Dragoon Guards
- Commands: 2nd Cavalry Brigade
- Battles/wars: French Revolutionary Wars; Irish Rebellion of 1798; Battle of Ballinamuck; Napoleonic Wars; Peninsular War; Siege of Badajoz (1812); Battle of Villagarcia; Battle of Salamanca; Battle of Majadahonda; Siege of Burgos; Battle of Vitoria; Battle of Toulouse (1814); Hundred Days; Battle of Waterloo †

Major-General Sir William Ponsonby KCB (13 October 1772 – 18 June 1815) was a British Army officer and politician who served in the French Revolutionary and Napoleonic Wars. He was killed in action at the Battle of Waterloo.

== Early life and education ==
He was the second son of William Ponsonby, who was created Baron Ponsonby of Imokilly in 1806, and Hon. Louisa Molesworth. He was the grandson of politician Hon. John Ponsonby and great-grandson of the 3rd Duke of Devonshire and the 1st Earl of Bessborough. Educated at Kilkenny and Eton, he married Hon. Georgiana FitzRoy, youngest daughter of Charles FitzRoy, 1st Baron Southampton. Together they had five children:

- Hon. Anne Louisa (d. 23 Jan 1863), who married William Tighe Hamilton and together had at least one son, Frederick FitzRoy Hamilton.
- Hon. Charlotte Georgiana (d. 7 Sep 1883), who married firstly Lt.-Col. John Horace Thomas Stapleton, son of Lt.-Gen. William Stapleton and Anna Maria Keppel (daughter of the Bishop of Exeter, Frederick Keppel), and had no issue. Secondly Rear-Adm. Sir Charles Talbot, son of Rev. Charles Talbot. They had seven children.
- Mary Elizabeth (d. 14 Sep 1838), who married Rev. Henry George Talbot, brother of her sister's husband, Charles. They had one son, Maj. Henry Charles Talbot.
- Frances Isabella (d. 1845), who married Rev. Hyde Wyndham Beadon, son of Rt. Rev. Richard Beadon and Annabella à Court, daughter of Sir William à Court, 1st Baronet. They had five children.
- Lord William (6 Feb 1816 – 2 Oct 1861), married Maria Theresa Duerbeck but died without issue.

== Political career ==
Between 1796 and 1798, Ponsonby sat as a Member of Parliament (MP) in the Irish House of Commons for the Tories and represented Bandonbridge. Subsequently, he stood for Fethard (County Tipperary) and held this seat until the Act of Union in 1801. He entered the British House of Commons in 1812, sitting for Londonderry until his death. In 1815, he was appointed a Knight Commander of the Order of the Bath (KCB).

== Peninsular War ==
When Ponsonby's command, the 5th Dragoon Guards, arrived in the Peninsula in October 1811, it became part of John Le Marchant's heavy cavalry brigade. For the rest of the war, this brigade included the 5th Dragoon Guards and the 3rd and 4th Dragoons. Ponsonby took part in Le Marchant's famous charge at the Battle of Salamanca in July 1812. On that occasion, the British heavy dragoons rode down one French infantry division and part of a second before being repulsed. Upon Le Marchant's death in the battle, Ponsonby took over the brigade, participating in the campaign that included the Siege of Burgos. In 1813, Ponsonby led his 1,200-strong cavalry brigade at the Battle of Vitoria. During the Battle of the Pyrenees and the autumn campaigns in the mountains, the Duke of Wellington sent the bulk of his cavalry to the rear. On 25 January 1814, Ponsonby took leave of his brigade and in the final battles in France, Lord Charles Manners exercised command.

== Battle of Waterloo ==
Ponsonby's part in the Battle of Waterloo is remembered because it highlights some pertinent points about cavalry charging. Ponsonby was in command of the Union Brigade, so-called because it included an English, a Scottish and an Irish regiment. The brigade consisted of the 1st Royal and 6th Inniskilling Regiments of Dragoons in the first line and the 2nd Royal North British Dragoons (Scots Greys) in reserve. It had counter-attacked to great effect against the disorganised French columns of d'Erlon's I Corps. Carried away by their initial success, however, the brigade failed to rally and continued towards the French positions. The Scots Greys in particular, forgetting their supporting role and ignoring the "recall", charged on in disordered groups, some of whom reached the French guns on the other side of the valley. By this time their horses were exhausted and a swift retribution followed in the form of a counter-attack by the French lancers. The brigade suffered very heavy losses (see table below) and played no further part in the battle.

Ponsonby, who was mounted on a horse of less value than the best one in his stable, rode too far and with his horse mired in mud close to enemy lines, was set upon by French Lancers. Recognising his rank and worth as a prisoner, the French gestured to him, urging him to surrender. He failed to understand them, and, when a group of his own Union Brigade spotted him and rode to his rescue, the lancers from one of the French line regiments (either the 3rd Lancers or 4th Lancers) attached to d'Erlon's I Corps had no option but to kill him. Myths growing up after the battle turned this into a guardsman from the "Red Lancers", which included the surviving squadron of the Polish lancers of the Guard.

Following Ponsonby's death, command of the Union Brigade devolved upon Lieutenant-Colonel Arthur Clifton of the 1st Royal Dragoons.

Battle Order of the 2nd Union Cavalry Brigade, Battle of Waterloo
Unit	Commander	Rank & File	Casualties	Officer Losses
2nd Union Cavalry Brigade	Maj-Gen William Ponsonby †	1186	582	35
1st (Royal) Dragoons	Lieutenant Colonel Arthur Clifton	394	182	14
2nd (Royal North British) Dragoons	Lieutenant-Colonel James Inglis Hamilton †	396	185	14
6th (Inniskilling) Dragoons	Lieutenant Colonel Joseph Muter	396	215	7

== Memorials ==
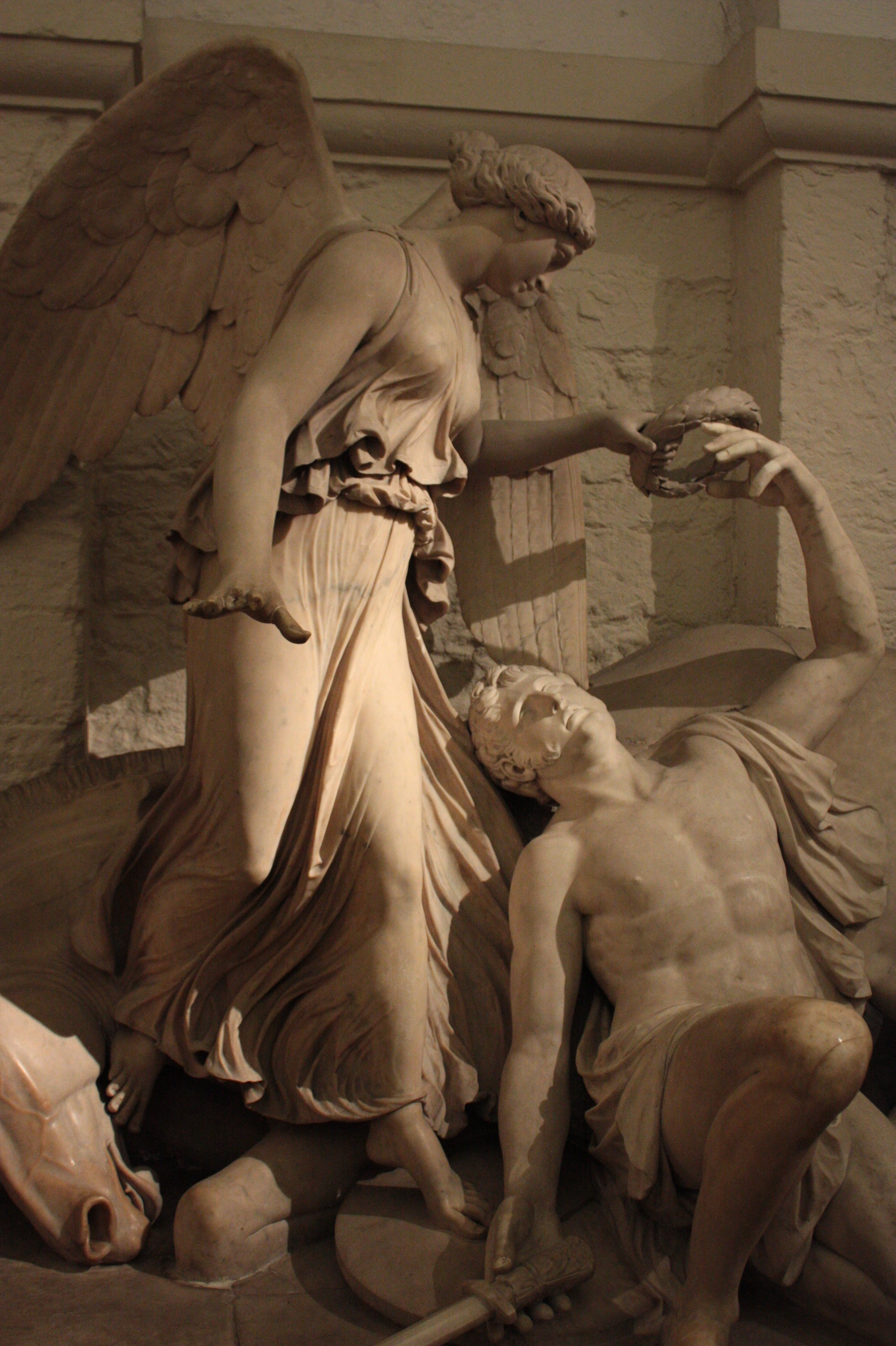
Monument to Ponsonby in St Paul's Cathedral

Ponsonby has a large marble monument at the west end of the crypt of St Paul's Cathedral in London. It was designed by Edward Hodges Baily in 1815.

== Other ==
In the 1970 film Waterloo, Ponsonby was played by Michael Wilding.

== Notes ==
Parliament of Ireland
Preceded by Broderick Chinnery; Lodge Evans Morres	Member of Parliament for Bandonbridge; 1796–1798; With: Broderick Chinnery	Succeeded by Broderick Chinnery; Robert William O'Callaghan
Preceded by Daniel Gahan; Thomas Barton	Member of Parliament for Fethard (County Tipperary); 1798 – 1801; With: John Taylor	Succeeded by Parliament of the United Kingdom
Parliament of the United Kingdom
Preceded by Hon. Charles William Stewart; Lord George Thomas Beresford	Member of Parliament for Londonderry; 1812 – 1815; With: Hon. Charles William Stewart 1812–1814; Alexander Stewart 1814–1815	Succeeded by Alexander Stewart; George Robert Dawson
