= Robert Cowan (governor) =

Irish colonial administrator

Robert Cowan (died 21 February 1737) was an Irish colonial administrator and the East India Company's Governor of Bombay from 1729 to 1734. He was a collateral ancestor of the Marquesses of Londonderry through the marriage of his sister, Mary Cowan, to Alexander Stewart, father of Robert Stewart, 1st Marquess of Londonderry.

Cowan was descended from Ulster Scots Presbyterian stock, and his father, John Cowan, was an Alderman of the city of Derry. He entered the service of the East India Company some time before 1720 and retired in 1735, two years before his death. In 1721, he was involved in an unsuccessful campaign against Maratha Koli Admiral Kanhoji Angre. His personal fortune, amassed as governor, became part of the basis of the wealth of the Stewart family for generations.

== Chronology ==
1710-1719 Lisbon (Portugal) (Teggin 2020, 36-36).

1710-1717 Trade in madeira wine (Teggin 2020, 7)

1717-1718 RC leaves Lisbon for London

1719 feb 17 petition of Robert Cowan to East India Company to travel East (Teggin 36). Robert Cowan allowed to travel as free merchant under East India Company rules

1718-1721 London

1721-22 Goa (India) (Teggin 60–92)

1721 feb 8 – 1722 jan 6. 287 letters written by RC from Goa. (34 letters about wine and arak trade)

1721 February Robert Cowan arrives in Goa as EIC representative.

1721 Robert Cowan writes treatise of 1721 with Portuguese (Teggin 2020, 86–92, text 338–342)

RC fluent Portuguese speaker (Teggin 2020, 73) letters written in French (Teggin 2020, 19). He knew Gujarati language? (Teggin 2020, 19) His counterpart was Francis Joseph de Sampayo é Castro, Viceroy of Portuguese India (1720-1723). (Teggin 2020, 73)

1722 April- August Surat (Gujarat, India) (Teggin 2020, 93–102)

1722 RC appointed by EIC to overlook company accounts in Surat. (Teggin 2020, 91)

1722 April RC order set of armorial plates [Cowan to Scattergood, Surat, Apr. 1722, (PRONI, Cowan Papers, D654/B/1/1AA, f. 137v)] (Teggin 2020, 306). It took three years to complete the order (1722-1725).

1722 August – 1724 Bombay

1724-1727 Mocha (Yemen) (Teggin 2020, 103–154).

1724 January RC hired by EIC to head factory in Mocha. (arabica coffee). He was chief representative of EIC in Mocha. Cowan deals with coffee trade (Teggin 2020, 107–116). Robert Cowan proposes the closing of the Mocha office of East India Company (which then occurs).

1725 William Cowan (Robert's brother) joins EIC. (William in Lisbon 1719-1725?) RC's ships travelled to Malacca, Judda and Bombay, Maldives, China Bussorah from Mocha (Teggin 2020, 128–129)

1727 withdrawal of Mocha Factory.

1728- 1735 Bombay (Mumbai, India) (Teggin 2020, 155–277)

1728 RC appointed Governor of Bombay.

1729 July new firman negotiated with Mocha.

1732-1735 travels for RC [destination (ship date)]: Bengal (Carolina Aug 1732); Bengal (Carolina May 1733) Bengal (Edward Feb 1734) Bengal (Aug 1734) Bengal and Mangalore (Balls 31st Oct 1732) Bombay (Royal Guardian Aug 1734) Bussorah (Bussorah Merchant Nov 1733) Bussorah (Peggy Feb 1734) Bussorah (Carolina (Jan 1735) Calcutta (Edward Aug 1733) China (Balls Jul 1732) China/Canton (Nassau Mar 1733) China/Canton (Nassau May 1733) China/Canton (Cowan Frigate Apr 1734) Malabar (Cowan Frigate Aug 1734) Malacca (Edward (Aug 1732) Malacca (Edward (Aug 1732) Malacca (Edward Nov 1732) Malacca (Edward Jul 1733) Malacca (Nassau Jan 1735) Mocha and Malabar (Nassau Oct 1732) Mocha and Malabar (Carolina Oct 1732) Mocha (Edward Oct 1734) Mocha and Bussorah (Carolina Sept 1734) Surat (Carolina Jan 1733) Surat (Nassau Oct 1734) Surat (Wilmington Oct 1734) [Teggin 237]

1734 October instructs John Gould Jr to find a house at St. James’ in London (Teggin 2020, 292)

1735 4 January will of RC. Will of Robert Cowan, Bombay, 4 Jan. 1735, (PRONI, Cowan Papers, D654/C/1/1A, f. 1). (Teggin 2020, 293). Chief beneficiary his brother William Cowan. In the case of the latter's demise, then Mary Cowan. The will provides that an estate should be purchased for future generations [Will of Robert Cowan, Bombay, 4 Jan. 1735, (PRONI, Cowan Papers, D654/C/1/1A, f. 1)].

== Bibliography ==
- Edward Owen Teggin. "The East India Company Career of Sir Robert Cowan in Bombay and the Western Indian Ocean, c. 1719-35" (PDF).
- Public Record Office of Northern Ireland. "The Cowan inheritance" (PDF). The Londonderry Estate Office Archive.
- Watson, I. B. (2008) "Cowan, Sir Robert (d. 1737)", Oxford Dictionary of National Biography, Oxford University Press, accessed 1 Nov 2008 (subscription, Wikipedia Library access or UK public library membership required)

Government offices
Preceded by William Phipps	Governor of Bombay; 1729 – 1734	Succeeded by John Horne
Parliament of Great Britain
Preceded by John Goddard; Henry Penton	Member of Parliament for Tregony; 1737; With: Henry Penton	Succeeded by Henry Penton; Joseph Gulston
