= Marquess of Londonderry =

Title in the Peerage of Ireland

Marquessate of Londonderry
- Arms: Quarterly: 1st & 4th, Or, a Bend counter-company Argent and Azure, between two Lions rampant Gules (Stewart); 2nd, Argent, a Bend engrailed between six Martlets Sable (Tempest); 3rd, Azure, three sinister Gauntlets Or (Vane). Crests: Centre: A Dragon statant Or (Stewart); Dexter: A Griffin's Head erased per pale Argent and Sable, beaked Gules (Tempest); Sinister: A dexter Cubit Arm in Armour, the hand in a Gauntlet proper, graping a Sword proper, pommel and hilt Or (Vane). Supporters: Dexter: A Moor proper, wreathed about the temples Argent and Azure, holding in the exterior hand a Shield Azure, garnished Or, and charged with a Sun-in-Splendour Gold; Sinister: A Lion Or, gorged with a Collar Argent, charged with three Mullets Sable.
- Creation date: 13 January 1816
- Created by: The Prince Regent (acting on behalf of his father King George III)
- Peerage: Peerage of Ireland
- First holder: Robert Stewart, 1st Earl of Londonderry
- Present holder: Frederick Vane-Tempest-Stewart, 10th Marquess
- Heir presumptive: Lord Reginald Vane-Tempest-Stewart
- Subsidiary titles: Earl of Londonderry; Earl Vane (United Kingdom); Viscount Castlereagh; Viscount Seaham (United Kingdom); Baron Londonderry; Baron Stewart (United Kingdom)
- Status: Extant
- Former seats: Mount Stewart; Plas Machynlleth; Seaham Hall; Wynyard Hall
- Motto: METUENDA COROLLA DRACONIS (The dragon’s crest is to be feared)

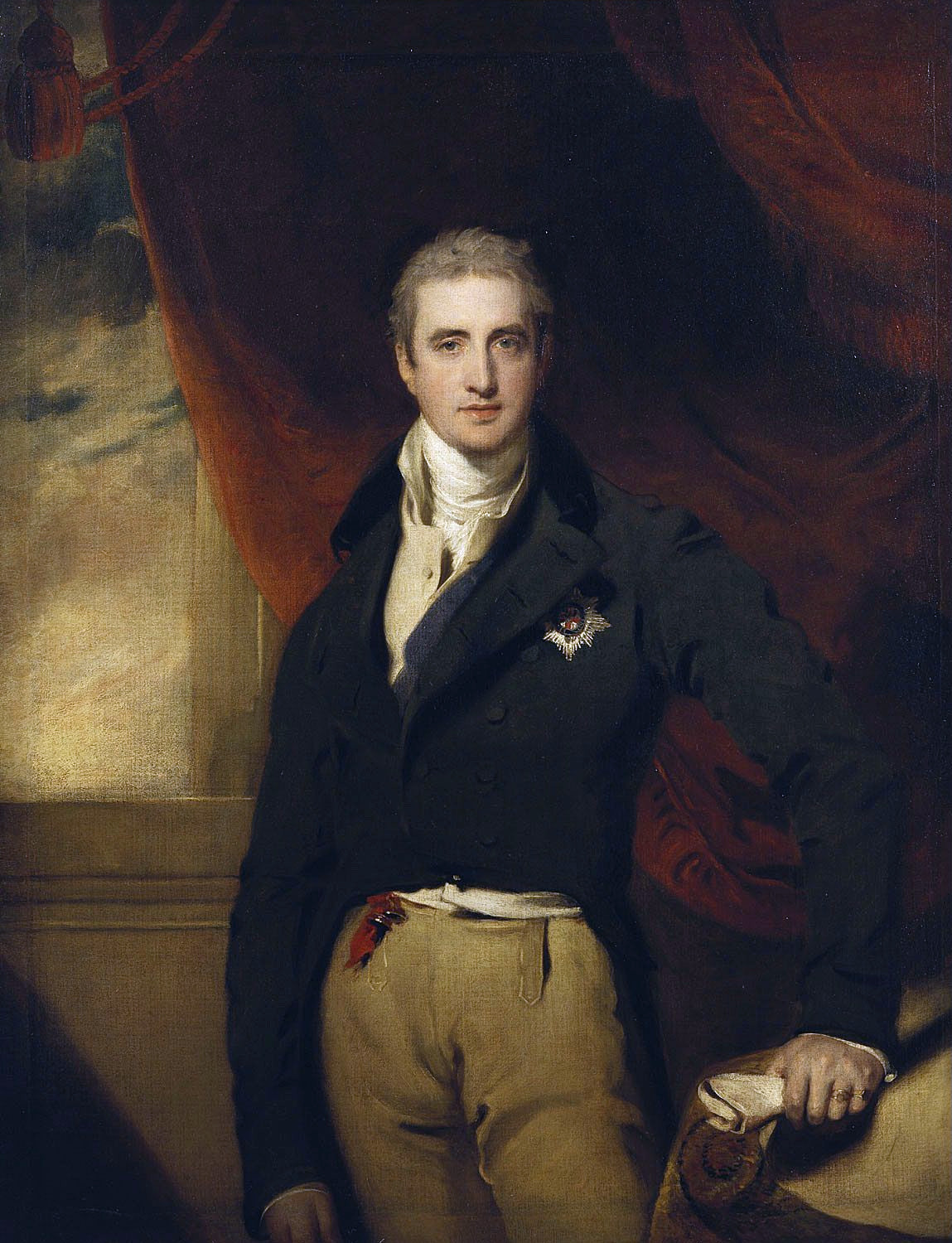
Robert Stewart, Viscount Castlereagh, British Foreign Secretary, who became the second Marquess of Londonderry in 1821

Marquess of Londonderry, of the County of Londonderry (/ˈlʌndəndri/ LUN-dən-dree), (Note: The pronunciation of the family name differs from that of the place.) is a title in the Peerage of Ireland.

== History ==
The title was created in 1816 for Robert Stewart, 1st Earl of Londonderry. He had earlier represented County Down in the Irish House of Commons. Stewart had already been created Baron Londonderry in 1789, Viscount Castlereagh, of Castlereagh in the County of Down, in 1795 and Earl of Londonderry, of the County of Londonderry, in 1796. These titles are also in the Peerage of Ireland.

He was the son of Alexander Stewart, who had married Mary Cowan, sister and heiress of Robert Cowan, who gained great wealth as Governor of Bombay from 1729 to 1737. Alexander was from Ballylawn, a townland at the south-west corner of Inishowen in the north of County Donegal, a county located in the west of Ulster in the northern part of Ireland. However, much of the Stewart family's wealth was based on the estates which came into the family through this marriage.

The 1st Marquess was one of the few people to become a Marquess without inheriting any titles prior to the creation. He sat in the British House of Lords as one of the twenty-eight original Irish representative peer from 1800 to 1821. He was succeeded by his son from his first marriage to Lady Sarah Seymour. The 2nd Marquess, better known as Lord Castlereagh (he went by the courtesy title of Viscount Castlereagh from 1796 to 1821), was a noted statesman and diplomat. Castlereagh is best remembered for his tenure as Foreign Secretary of the United Kingdom from 1812 to 1822 and played an important role at the Congress of Vienna of 1814 to 1815. He committed suicide in 1822, one year after succeeding his father in the marquessate. The 2nd Marquess did not follow his father as a Representative Peer into the House of Lords, this permitted him to continue fulfilling his roles in the House of Commons.

Castlereagh was succeeded by his half-brother, the 3rd Marquess. He was the only son from the 1st Marquess's second marriage to Lady Frances Pratt, daughter of Charles Pratt, 1st Earl Camden. He was a General in the Army and like his elder half-brother a prominent politician and diplomat. Lord Londonderry served as Under-Secretary of State for War and the Colonies from 1807 to 1809, fought in the Napoleonic Wars and was Ambassador to Austria from 1814 to 1823. In 1814 he was created Baron Stewart, of Stewart's Court and Ballylawn in County Donegal, in the Peerage of the United Kingdom. In 1819 Londonderry married as his second wife Lady Frances Vane-Tempest (died 1865), daughter and wealthy heiress of Sir Henry Vane-Tempest, 2nd Baronet, through which marriage substantial estates in County Durham came into the Stewart family. He assumed the additional surname of Vane on his marriage and in 1823 he was created Viscount Seaham, of Seaham in the County Palatine of Durham, and Earl Vane, with remainder to the male issue of his second marriage. These titles are in the Peerage of the United Kingdom.

Lord Londonderry was succeeded in the viscountcy of Seaham and earldom of Vane according to the special remainder by his eldest son from his second marriage while he was succeeded in the Irish titles and the barony of Stewart by his son from his first marriage to Lady Catherine Bligh, the 4th Marquess. He died childless in 1872 and was succeeded by his half-brother, the 5th Marquess, who had already succeeded his father as second Earl Vane in 1854. He represented Durham North in the House of Commons and served as Lord-Lieutenant of County Durham. In 1851 the 5th Marquess assumed by Royal licence the additional surname of Tempest. On his death, the titles passed to his eldest son, the 6th Marquess. He was a Conservative politician and held office in the administrations of Lord Salisbury and Arthur Balfour as Lord-Lieutenant of Ireland, as Postmaster General, as President of the Board of Education, as Lord Privy Seal and as Lord President of the Council. In 1885 he assumed by Royal licence the additional and principal surname of Stewart.

He was succeeded by his son, the 7th Marquess, who was also a Conservative politician. He had a career in both Irish and British politics but is best known for his role as Secretary of State for Air from 1931 to 1935. Lord Londonderry subsequently gained notoriety for his informal diplomatic contacts with senior members of the German government. He made six visits to Nazi Germany between January 1936 and September 1938, meeting Adolf Hitler on a number of occasions and sympathising with some of his viewpoints. His wife Edith Vane-Tempest-Stewart, Marchioness of Londonderry, was an influential society hostess; she is remembered for her close friendship with Ramsay MacDonald. Lord Londonderry was succeeded by his son, the 8th Marquess. He represented County Down in the House of Commons as a Conservative from 1931 to 1945.

The heir apparent to the marquessate is styled Viscount Castlereagh, although the Marquess is also the Earl Vane, and the heir apparent's heir apparent, when such exists, is styled Lord Stewart.

Between 1823 and 1854 and between 1872 and 1999, the Marquesses of Londonderry sat in the House of Lords as The Earl Vane. Between 1822 and 1823 and between 1854 and 1872, they sat as The Lord Stewart.

== Residences ==
The principal family seats were Mount Stewart, near Newtownards in County Down, Northern Ireland, and the Wynyard Park estate in County Durham. Other properties included Seaham Hall in County Durham, as well as Londonderry House on Park Lane in London (where the Londonderry Hotel was later located), and Plas Machynlleth in mid-Wales.

== Marquesses of Londonderry (1816) ==
- Robert Stewart, 1st Marquess of Londonderry (1739–1821)
- Robert Stewart, 2nd Marquess of Londonderry (1769–1822)
- Charles William Stewart, 3rd Marquess of Londonderry (1778–1854)
- Frederick William Robert Stewart, 4th Marquess of Londonderry (1805–1872)
- George Henry Robert Charles William Vane-Tempest, 5th Marquess of Londonderry (1821–1884)

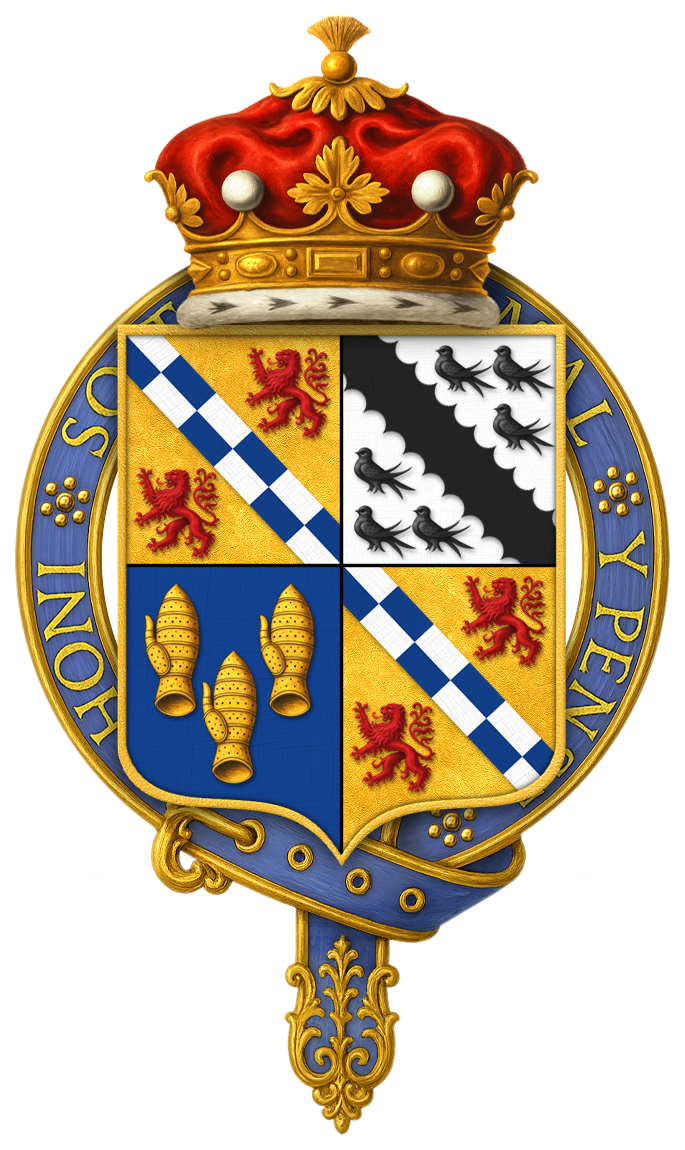
Arms of the 6th Marquess

- Charles Stewart Vane-Tempest-Stewart, 6th Marquess of Londonderry (1852–1915)
- Charles Stewart Henry Vane-Tempest-Stewart, 7th Marquess of Londonderry (1878–1949)
- Edward Charles Stewart Robin Vane-Tempest-Stewart, 8th Marquess of Londonderry (1902–1955)
- Alexander Charles Robert "Alistair" Vane-Tempest-Stewart, 9th Marquess of Londonderry (1937–2012)
- Frederick Aubrey Vane-Tempest-Stewart, 10th Marquess of Londonderry (born 1972)

The 4th Marquess did not inherit the Seaham viscountcy and Vane earldom as he was not the heir male of the 3rd Marquess's second wife, a limitation of the remainder of those peerages.

== Present peer ==
Frederick Aubrey Vane-Tempest-Stewart, 10th Marquess of Londonderry (born 6 September 1972), is the son of the 9th Marquess and his wife, Doreen Patricia Wells, who was a ballerina with the Royal Ballet between 1955 and 1974. He was styled as Viscount Castlereagh from birth and later as Earl Vane.

On 20 June 2012, Earl Vane succeeded his father as Marquess of Londonderry (I., 1816), Earl of Londonderry (I., 1796), Earl Vane (UK, 1823), Viscount Castlereagh (I., 1795), Viscount Seaham of Seaham (UK, 1823), Baron Stewart of Stewart's Court and Ballylawn (UK, 1814), and Baron Londonderry (I., 1789).

The heir presumptive is Londonderry's brother, Lord Reginald Alexander Vane-Tempest-Stewart (born 1977), whose heir apparent is his son Robin Gabriel Vane-Tempest-Stewart (born 2004).

== Line of succession (simplified) ==
- Charles William Vane, 3rd Marquess of Londonderry, 1st Earl Vane, 1st Viscount Seaham, 1st Baron Stewart (1778–1854)
  - Frederick Stewart, 4th Marquess of Londonderry (1805–1872)
  - George Henry Robert Charles William Vane-Tempest, 5th Marquess of Londonderry, 2nd Earl Vane, 2nd Viscount Seaham, 3rd Baron Stewart (1821–1884)
    - Charles Stewart Vane-Tempest-Stewart, 6th Marquess of Londonderry (1852–1915)
      - Charles Stewart Henry Vane-Tempest-Stewart, 7th Marquess of Londonderry (1878–1949)
        - Edward Charles Robert Vane-Tempest-Stewart, 8th Marquess of Londonderry (1902–1955)
          - Alexander Charles Robert Vane-Tempest-Stewart, 9th Marquess of Londonderry (1937–2012)
            - Frederick Aubrey Vane-Tempest-Stewart, 10th Marquess of Londonderry (born 1972)
            - (1) Lord Reginald Alexander Vane-Tempest-Stewart (b. 1977)
              - (2) Robin Gabriel Vane-Tempest-Stewart (b. 2004)
  - Lord Ernest McDonnell Vane-Tempest (1836–1885)
    - Charles Henry Vane-Tempest (1871–1899)
      - Ernest Charles William Vane-Tempest (1894–1957)
        - Charles Stewart McDonnell Vane-Tempest (1921–2008)
          - (3) Charles Stewart Martin St. George Vane-Tempest (b. 1950)
            - (4) Christopher James Stewart St. George Vane-Tempest (b. 1978)
            - (5) James Alexander Stewart Vane-Tempest (b. 1981)
              - (6) George Frederick Stewart Vane-Tempest (b. 2012)
              - (7) Harry John Stewart Vane-Tempest (b. 2014)
          - (8) Charles Erkki William Vane-Tempest (b. 1958)
            - (9) Charles Petter Vane-Tempest (b. 1990)
          - (10) Donald John Ernest Vane-Tempest (b. 1961)
            - (11) Thomas Christopher Vane-Tempest (b. 1986)
          - (12) Harold Michael St. George Vane-Tempest (b. 1962)
            - (13) John Michael Vane-Tempest (b. 1990)
            - (14) Timothy Alexander Vane-Tempest (b. 1992)

=== Family tree ===
Marquess of Londonderry family tree

Alexander Stewart; 1699–1781
Baron Londonderry (2nd creation), 1789; Viscount Castlereagh, 1795; Earl of Londonderry (3rd creation), 1796; Marquess of Londonderry, 1816
Sarah Frances Seymour; 1747–1770	Robert Stewart; 1739–1821; 1st Marquess of Londonderry, etc.	Frances Pratt c. 1751–1833
Baron Stewart, 1814; Earl Vane and Viscount Seaham, 1823
Robert Stewart; 1769–1822; 2nd Marquess of Londonderry, etc.	Catherine Bligh d. 1812	Charles William Vane (né Stewart); 1778–1854; 3rd Marquess of Londonderry, etc., 1st Earl Vane, etc.	Frances Anne Vane; 1800–1865
Frederick William Robert Stewart; 1805–1872; 4th Marquess of Londonderry, etc., 2nd Baron Stewart	George Henry Robert Charles William Vane-Tempest; 1821–1884; 5th Marquess of Londonderry, etc., 2nd Earl Vane, etc., 3rd Baron Stewart
Charles Stewart Vane-Tempest-Stewart; 1852–1915; 6th Marquess of Londonderry, etc., 3rd Earl Vane, etc., 4th Baron Stewart
Charles Stewart Henry Vane-Tempest-Stewart; 1878–1949; 7th Marquess of Londonderry, etc., 4th Earl Vane, etc., 5th Baron Stewart
Edward Charles Stewart Robert "Robin" Vane-Tempest-Stewart; 1902–1955; 8th Marquess of Londonderry, etc., 5th Earl Vane, etc., 6th Baron Stewart
Alexander Charles Robert "Alastair" Vane-Tempest-Stewart; 1937–2012; 9th Marquess of Londonderry, etc., 6th Earl Vane, etc., 7th Baron Stewart
Frederick Vane-Tempest-Stewart b. 1972; 10th Marquess of Londonderry, etc., 7th Earl Vane, etc., 8th Baron Stewart	Reginald Alexander Vane-Tempest-Stewart b. 1977
Heir presumptive to all titles

== See also ==
- Baron Plunket
- Durham County Record Office: where the records of County Durham estates are held
