= Richard Wilford =

Horticulturist

Richard Wilford is a British horticulturist with a specialist interest in montane plants and geophytes, who is a collections manager at the Royal Botanic Gardens, Kew. He is on the editorial committee of Curtis's Botanical Magazine and Kew Magazine and a member of the Royal Horticultural Society Daffodil and Tulip Committee.

== Publications ==
- Wilford, R. Tulips: Species and Hybrids for the Gardener (2006) Timber Press ISBN 0881927635*
- Wilford, R. Alpines, from Mountain to Garden (2010) Royal Botanic Gardens, Kew – Botanical Magazine monograph ISBN 1842461729
- (ed.) Brian Mathew; Boyce. P, Mayo, S., Wilford, R., Bogner, J. Curtis's Botanical Magazine Volume 12, Part 3, August 1995 – devoted to the Araceae. ASIN B007J9IX9U

== Articles ==
- Wilford, R. (2010). Tropaeolum tricolor. Curtis’s Botanical Magazine 27 (3): 262—267.
- Wilford, Richard (1999), "Roscoeas for the rock garden", Quarterly Bulletin of the Alpine Garden Society, 67 (1): 93–101
