= Christine Kinealy =

American historian

- Born: Wallasey, England, UK
- Education: Trinity College Dublin (PhD)
- Occupations: Historian, author; founding director of Ireland’s Great Hunger Institute at Quinnipiac University

Christine Kinealy is an Irish historian, author, and founding director of Ireland's Great Hunger Institute at Quinnipiac University. She is an authority on Irish history.

Kinealy has lived in the United States since 2007. She was named "one of the most influential Irish Americans" in 2011 by Irish America magazine.

== Early life and education ==
Kinealy was born and raised in Wallasey by her father, a native of County Tipperary and her mother, whose family was from County Mayo. She earned her PhD from Trinity College Dublin, where she completed her dissertation on the introduction of the Poor Law to Ireland.

== Career ==
Following completion of her graduate studies, she worked in educational and research institutes in Dublin, Belfast and Liverpool.

In Northern Ireland in the 1980s, Kinealy taught classes in Irish history at a women’s center in the loyalist Shankill district of Belfast, covering poverty, disenfranchisement and women's issues.

In 1997, when Prime Minister Tony Blair spoke about the Great Hunger, the British House of Parliament invited her to speak about The Great Hunger. She did so in the place "where so many egregious relief policies had been made that resulted in so many tragic deaths.” In 2007 she became a tenured professor at Drew University’s Caspersen Graduate School in Madison, New Jersey.

While a professor at Drew University she documented the Irish hunger, from about 1845 to 1852, one of the first humanitarian crises covered by global media. In Irish America she described how individuals and religious groups from around the globe contributed donations.

The New York Times quoted Kinealy's assessment of responsibility typically assigned for the starvation in Ireland: "The whole British argument in the famine was that the poor are poor because of a character defect...it’s a dangerous, meanspirited and tired argument."

In 2013, she was appointed professor of history and Irish studies at Quinnipiac University in Hamden, Connecticut. She serves as director of the Ireland's Great Hunger Institute at the university. Her charter includes developing an undergraduate Irish studies program at Quinnipiac.

== Awards ==
- Named ‘Woman of the Year’ by Irish America Heritage and Culture Committee of the Department of Education, New York in 2014
- Inducted into Irish America Hall of Fame, 2014
- Named one of Top 100 Educators in Irish America in 2013
- Ambassador for Ireland Award (Irish Government, presented through the St Patrick’s Committee of Holyoke).
- Named one of the most influential Irish Americans by Irish America Magazine.
- William Butler Yeats Award for Literary Achievement.

== Books ==
- Black Abolitionists in Ireland (New York: Routledge, 2020)
- Frederick Douglass and Ireland. In His Own Words, Volume II, (editor, New York. Routledge, 2018)
- Frederick Douglass and Ireland. In His Own Words, Volume I, (editor, New York. Routledge, 2018)
- The Bad Times. An Drochshaol, A graphic novel, with John Walsh (Connecticut: Quinnipiac University Press, 2015)
- Irish Hunger and Migration. Memory, Myth and Memorialization, ed.with Patrick Fitzgerald and Gerard Moran (Connecticut: Quinnipiac University Press, 2015),
- Private Charity to Ireland during the Great Hunger. The Kindness of Strangers (London: Bloomsbury Press, 2013).
- Daniel O’Connell and Anti-Slavery. The Saddest People the Sun Sees (London: Pickering and Chatto, 2011)
- War and Peace. Ireland Since the 1960s (London: Reaktion Books, 2010), 414 pages. Repeal and Revolution. 1848 in Ireland (Manchester: Manchester University Press, 2009)
- A New History of Ireland (first pub. 2004; re-issued 2008, with a new concluding chapter, Gloucestershire: Sutton Press, 2008)
- Lives of Victorian Political Figures: Daniel O’Connell (London: Pickering and Chatto, 2007), 350 pages.
- 1848. The Year the World Turned (co-edited with Kay Boardman, Newcastle: Cambridge Scholars Press, 2007; and chapter, ‘Invisible Nationalists. Women and the 1848 Rising in Ireland’)
- Power and Politics in Ireland (co-edited with Roger Swift. Dublin: Four Courts Press, 2006)
- This Great Calamity. The Irish Famine 1845-52 (first pub. in 1994, Dublin: Gill and Macmillan, reprinted with a new Introduction, 2006)
- Teaching and Learning History (with Geoff Timmins and Keith Vernon, London: Sage Publications, 2005),
- The Great Famine in Ireland, Impact, Ideology and Rebellion (London: Palgrave Press, 2002)
- Ireland. A Photohistory 1840-1940 (with Sean Sexton; London: Thames and Hudson, 2002 and 2013)
- Memory. Silence and Commemoration. Ireland’s Great Hunger (co-edited with David Valone. Maryland: University Press of America, 2002)
- The Forgotten Famine. Hunger and Poverty in Belfast 1840-50 (with Gerard MacAtasney, London, Pluto Press, 2000)
- A Disunited Kingdom. England, Ireland, Scotland and Wales, 1800-1949 (Cambridge: Cambridge University Press, 1999 and re-printed, 2008)
- A Death-Dealing Famine. The Great Hunger in Ireland (London: Pluto Press, 1997)
- The Famine in Ulster (joint editor with Trevor Parkhill and contributor, Belfast: Ulster Historical Foundation, 1997 and 2014)
- This Great Calamity. The Irish Famine 1845-52 (Dublin: Gill and Macmillan, 1994; Colorado: Roberts Reinhart, 1995)
- Making Sense of Irish History. Evidence in Ireland for the Young Historian. (joint editor with C. Gallagher and T. Parkhill, Belfast, 1990) 64 pages.
