= John Bew (historian) =

British historian

The Honourable John Bew CMG
- Born: Belfast, Northern Ireland
- Education: Pembroke College, Cambridge (BA, MPhil, PhD)
- Employer: King's College London
- Parents: Paul Bew (father); Greta Jones (mother)

John Bew CMG is Professor in History and Foreign Policy at King's College London and from 2013 to 2014 held the Henry A. Kissinger Chair in Foreign Policy and International Relations at the John W. Kluge Center. In October 2024, he became distinguished visiting fellow at the Hoover Institution at Stanford University and Distinguished Advisor to the Australian National Security College.

Bew has served in senior positions at the highest levels of the UK government. He spent over five years as the chief Foreign Policy Advisor in No.10 Downing Street, working for four Prime Ministers and through two general elections. He was the penholder on the last two UK national security strategies and intimately involved in the foreign policy challenges of that period, from the creation of AUKUS to the war in Ukraine.

He has worked across the aisle, serving both Conservative and Labour administrations and moving from a political appointee to a civil service role.

In 2021, he also served as the UK's expert representative to the NATO secretary general's Reflections Group, which provided recommendations for the alliance's 2022 Strategic Concept.

In 2019, Bew joined the Number 10 Policy Unit under Prime Minister Boris Johnson, continuing to serve as foreign policy advisor under successive Prime Ministers Liz Truss, Rishi Sunak. In 2023, the New Statesman described Bew as "the great survivor of Downing Street". It has been said that his book on realpolitik helped shared government policy over this time.

As a biographer of Clement Attlee and former writer at the New Statesman, he is widely regarded as a bipartisan rather than party political figure. Former National Security Advisor Lord Ricketts describes his strength as “applying historical expertise to modern policymaking, using the lessons of the past, and using the strategies of previous statesmen to inform the way governments do strategic work now”. According to David Liddington, chair of the Royal United Services Institute, “He's somebody certainly I think that would feel at home equally working for an Atlanticist, strong, pro-defence Labour ministry, as well as for the Conservative equivalent.”

Following the 2024 general election, he was asked to stay in government by the Keir Starmer administration, working on defence and security issues. He travelled with the new Prime Minister to the NATO Summit in Washington DC, was sent to Ukraine on behalf of the Prime Minister and helped launch the Strategic Defence Review.

== Biography ==
Bew is the son of Paul Bew, Professor of Irish Politics at Queen's University Belfast and his wife Greta Jones, a history professor at the University of Ulster.

Bew completed his education at Pembroke College, Cambridge, where he was a Foundation Scholar and a Thornton Scholar and attained a first class BA in History. He won the Member's Prize for the best MPhil in Historical Studies, before completing his doctoral dissertation "Politics, identity and the shaping of Unionism in the north of Ireland, from the French Revolution to the Home Rule Crisis" in 2006. From 2007 to 2010, Bew was Lecturer in Modern British History, Harris Fellow and Director of Studies at Peterhouse, Cambridge, where he was previously a Junior Research Fellow.

Bew is a contributing writer for the New Statesman and the author of several books, including Realpolitik: A History (2015) and Castlereagh: Enlightenment, War and Tyranny, published by Quercus in the UK in 2011 and by Oxford University Press in the United States the following year.

Bew's original work on Castlereagh formed the basis for a 2013 BBC Northern Ireland documentary that he presented.

Citizen Clem, published in 2016, was named a "book of the year" in The Times, The Sunday Times, Evening Standard, The Spectator and New Statesman and received excellent reviews in The Guardian, The Observer, Literary Review and London Review of Books. It was also awarded the 2017 Elizabeth Longford Prize for Historical Biography and the 2017 Orwell Prize. Phillip Collins, for The Times, described it as "The best book in the field of British politics".

In 2015, Bew was awarded a Philip Leverhulme Prize for Politics and International Relations. He was formerly a specialist advisor to the House of Commons Foreign Affairs Committee and head of the London think-tank Policy Exchange's Britain in the World Project, launched by the UK Secretary of State for Defence in March 2016, and coordinates its work on foreign policy. His most recent book is Realpolitik: A History published in 2016 by Oxford University Press.

Bew is an avid fan of Manchester United FC and used to play non-league football for Milton Rovers FC.

British prime minister Boris Johnson selected Bew to lead an "integrated review of security, defence, development and foreign policy, which advocated a "tilt" towards focus on the indo-pacific. Bew was also given responsibility for the Integrated Review Refresh which took place under Rishi Sunak and led to an increase in defence spending. closely involved in UK national security decisions for over five years, arguing for nimble alliances such as the AUKUS pact, mobilising the UK's Nordic and Baltic partnerships such as the Joint Expeditionary Force and pushing for greater technological security in areas like telecommunications. He was closely involved in UK policy on Ukraine including the sending of defensive military equipment to Ukraine. As a native of Northern Ireland, Bew was also intimately involved in the Windsor Framework and the subsequent negotiation process that led to the restoration of the Good Friday Agreement institutions in Northern Ireland.

Bew was appointed as Honorary Captain, Royal Naval Reserve, on 1 October 2025.

== Bibliography ==
=== Monographs ===
- Castlereagh: Enlightenment, War and Tyranny. Quercus Publishing. 2011.
- Realpolitik: A History. Oxford University Press. 2015.
- Citizen Clem: A Biography of Attlee. riverrun. 2016.
