= Theresa Vane-Tempest-Stewart, Marchioness of Londonderry =

Irish aristocrat, Unionist, and political hostess (1856–1919)

The Most Honourable The Marchioness of Londonderry
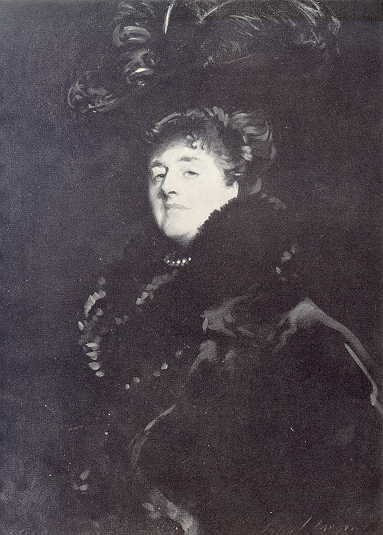
- Theresa, Marchioness of Londonderry by John Singer Sargent
- Born: Lady Theresa Susey Helen Chetwynd-Talbot; 6 June 1856; Ingestre Hall, Staffordshire, England
- Died: 16 March 1919 (aged 62)
- Spouse: Charles Vane-Tempest-Stewart, 6th Marquess of Londonderry (m. 1875; died 1915)
- Issue: Charles Vane-Tempest-Stewart, 7th Marquess of Londonderry; Lord Reginald Vane-Tempest-Stewart; Helen Fox-Strangways, Countess of Ilchester
- Parents: Charles Chetwynd-Talbot, 19th Earl of Shrewsbury; Anna Theresa Cockerell
- Occupation: Socialite, political hostess

Theresa Susey Helen Vane-Tempest-Stewart, Marchioness of Londonderry (née Chetwynd-Talbot; 6 June 1856 – 16 March 1919) was a British socialite and political hostess. She was a leading Unionist campaigner against Irish Home Rule, serving as president of the Ulster Women's Unionist Council from 1913 to 1919. She was said to be one of the most "dominating feminine personalities" of the time and was referred to as the "Queen of Toryism" and a "highwaywoman in a tiara."

== Early life ==
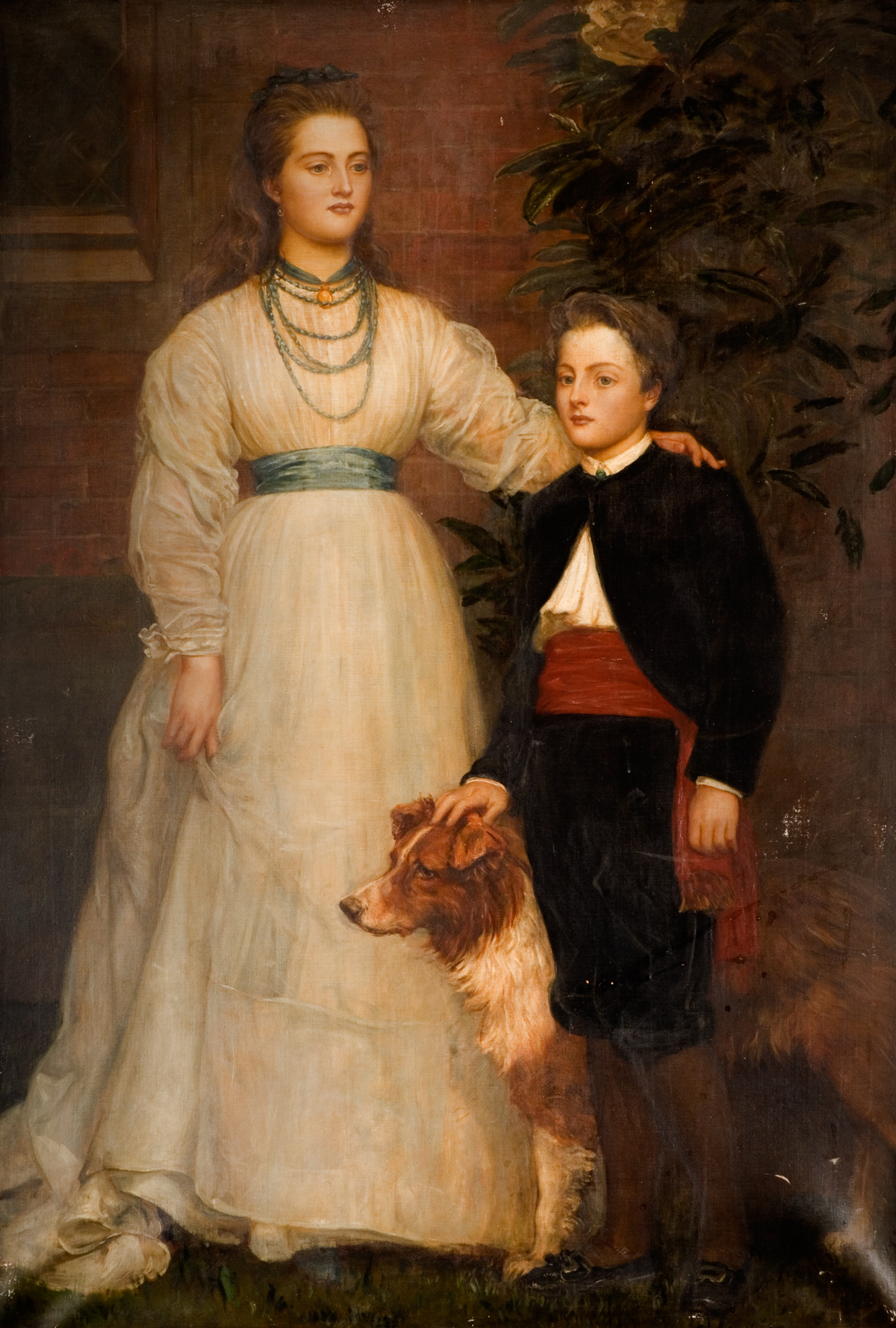
Lady Theresa Chetwynd-Talbot and her brother, Viscount Ingestre, by Valentine Cameron Prinsep

She was born was born Lady Theresa Chetwynd-Talbot on 6 June 1856 at Ingestre Hall, her family's estate in Staffordshire. She was the elder daughter of Charles Chetwynd-Talbot, 19th Earl of Shrewsbury and his wife Anna Theresa Cockerell (1836–1912). She was brought up with conservative values and was interested in politics. She was an admirer of Benjamin Disraeli.

== Marriage ==
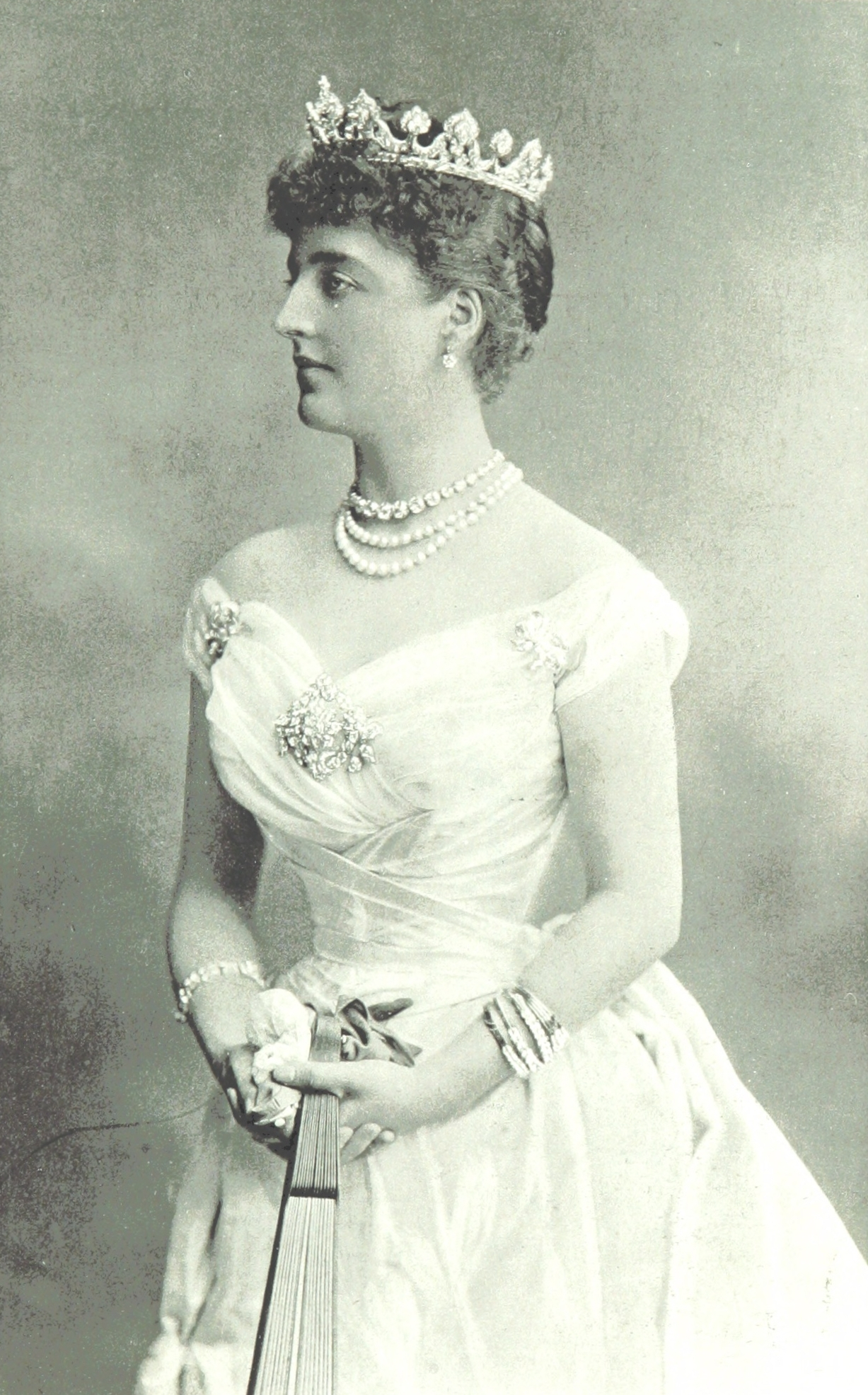
The Marchioness of Londonderry, 1889

She married Charles Vane-Tempest, Viscount Castlereagh, later the 6th Marquess of Londonderry, in the private chapel of Alton Hall in 1875. They were both leading Unionist campaigners against Irish independence. She was the President of the Ulster Women's Unionist Council. In 1893, she organised a petition of 20,000 women from Ulster to oppose the 1893 Home Rule bill in parliament.

She was considered the leading Tory hostess and entertained at the couples' houses at Wynyard Park, County Durham, Mount Stewart, County Down, Northern Ireland, and Londonderry House in London. Their guests included royalty. She was said to be one of the "dominating feminine personalities" of the time. She was referred to as the "Queen of Toryism" and a "highwaywoman in a tiara." She was said to be more persuasive than her husband, but they were united in their interests. She was not faithful to her husband.

In 1909 her portrait was painted by John Singer Sargent. The painting is now held by the National Trust at Mount Stewart in County Down.

The couple had two sons and one daughter:

- Lady Helen Mary Theresa Vane-Tempest-Stewart (8 September 1876 – 14 January 1956); married Giles Fox-Strangways, 6th Earl of Ilchester, had issue
- Charles Stewart Henry Vane-Tempest-Stewart, 7th Marquess of Londonderry (13 May 1878 – 10 February 1949); married The Hon. Edith Chaplin, had issue
- Lord Charles Stewart Reginald Vane-Tempest-Stewart (4 December 1879 – 9 October 1899); died unmarried

Lady Londonderry was widowed in 1915 and died in 1919.

== In the media ==
At the end of 2023 the BBC launched the radio and podcast miniseries The Mystery of Mount Stewart, narrated by Kerri Quinn, about a boat that sank on Strangford Lough in April 1895. Theresa, Lady Londonderry, had lent her sailing boat, as a treat to her senior servants, whom she called friends. The series tries to uncover what happened to the boat and its eight passengers that went missing.
