= Margaret Wrightson =

English artist

Margaret Wrightson Fellow of the Royal Society of Arts
- Born: 1877; Norton, County Durham
- Died: 1976 (aged 98–99)

Margaret Justina Wrightson FRBS (1877–1976) was a British artist, renowned for her work in sculpture.

== Early life and education ==
Margaret Wrightson was born at Norton Hall and her father was the politician Sir Thomas Wrightson. She never married, and had a studio and home in Bedford Gardens in London. Wrightson's younger sister, Jocelyn Wrightson, was a painter, mainly working in watercolours.

Wrightson first studied under William Blake Richmond at the Royal College of Art before travelling to Paris to learn from Édouard Lantéri. From 1901, Wrightson exhibited frequently at the Royal Academy of Arts Summer Exhibition. She also exhibited with the Society of Women Artists and at the Walker Art Gallery in Liverpool.

== Career ==
Wrightson received many commissions throughout her long career. Theresa, Marchioness of Londonderry, commissioned Wrightson to create a female nude which was completed in 1912 and sold at Christies in 2014 for £68,500. Wrightson created a sculpture of a woman titled ‘Mechanic, Women’s Army Auxiliary Corps’ in 1917 that was later exhibited at the Royal Academy; the work had been suggested as a war memorial. In 1925 she created a 'Viking Warrior' for Walter Runciman. Wrightston's memorial of Admiral Earl Jellicoe stands in St Paul's Cathedral, London. Other public works include the figure of Saint George on the Cramlington war memorial in Northumberland, created in 1922, and a figure memorialising Charles Lamb, situated in the Inner Temple gardens, London.

Several of Wrightson's works are in the collection of National Trust's Mount Stewart, including the popular bronze of Lady Mairi as a child. The work was restored in 2012 after originally being commissioned in 1925, and erected in 1928.

Wrightson became an Associate member of the Royal Society of British Sculptors in 1929 and a Fellow in 1943. She was also a member of the Royal Academy.

== Works ==
Title	Year	Medium	Gallery no.	Gallery	Location
Albert Sammons	1951–1952	-	PPHC000370	Royal College of Music	London, England
Albert Sammons	1951–1952	-	PPHC000371	Royal College of Music	London, England
Lady Edith Helen Chaplin, Marchioness of Londonderry, DBE (1878-1959) as President of the Women's Legion, Motor Drivers	1920	cast bronze & silver plated	1655801	Mount Stewart	County Down, Northern Ireland
Lady Helen Maglona Vane-Tempest-Stewart (1911-1986)	1930	bronze	1220135	Mount Stewart	County Down, Northern Ireland
Lady Mairi Elizabeth Vane-Tempest-Stewart, later Viscountess Bury (1921-2009) as a Child	1921–1926	Carrara marble	1221036	Mount Stewart	County Down, Northern Ireland
Lady Mairi Elizabeth Vane-Tempest-Stewart, later Viscountess Bury (1921-2009) as a Child, aged 4	1925–1926	Carrara marble	1221050	Mount Stewart	County Down, Northern Ireland
Lady Rose Keppel (b.1943), Attired in Highland Dress	1954	bronze	1220134	Mount Stewart	County Down, Northern Ireland
Lord John Rushworth Jellicoe of Scapa (1859–1935)	1910	bronze	1983/1075/10	National Museum of the Royal Navy, Portsmouth	England
Mechanic: Women's Auxiliary Army Corps	1917	bronze	5352		England
Sir John Rushworth Jellicoe (1859–1935)	1910	bronze	1992/337/1	National Museum of the Royal Navy, Portsmouth	England
The Mairi Fountain: Lady Mairi Elizabeth Vane-Tempest-Stewart, Viscountess Bury (1921-2009)	1928	bronze	1221060	Mount Stewart	County Down, Northern Ireland
Viking Warrior	1925	bronze & sandstone	-	Northumberland County Council	England
Youth and Progress	1958	bronze and aluminium			Fountain House, Fenchurch Street, EC3
