= Edith Vane-Tempest-Stewart, Marchioness of Londonderry =

English noble (1878–1959)

The Most Honourable The Marchioness of Londonderry DBE
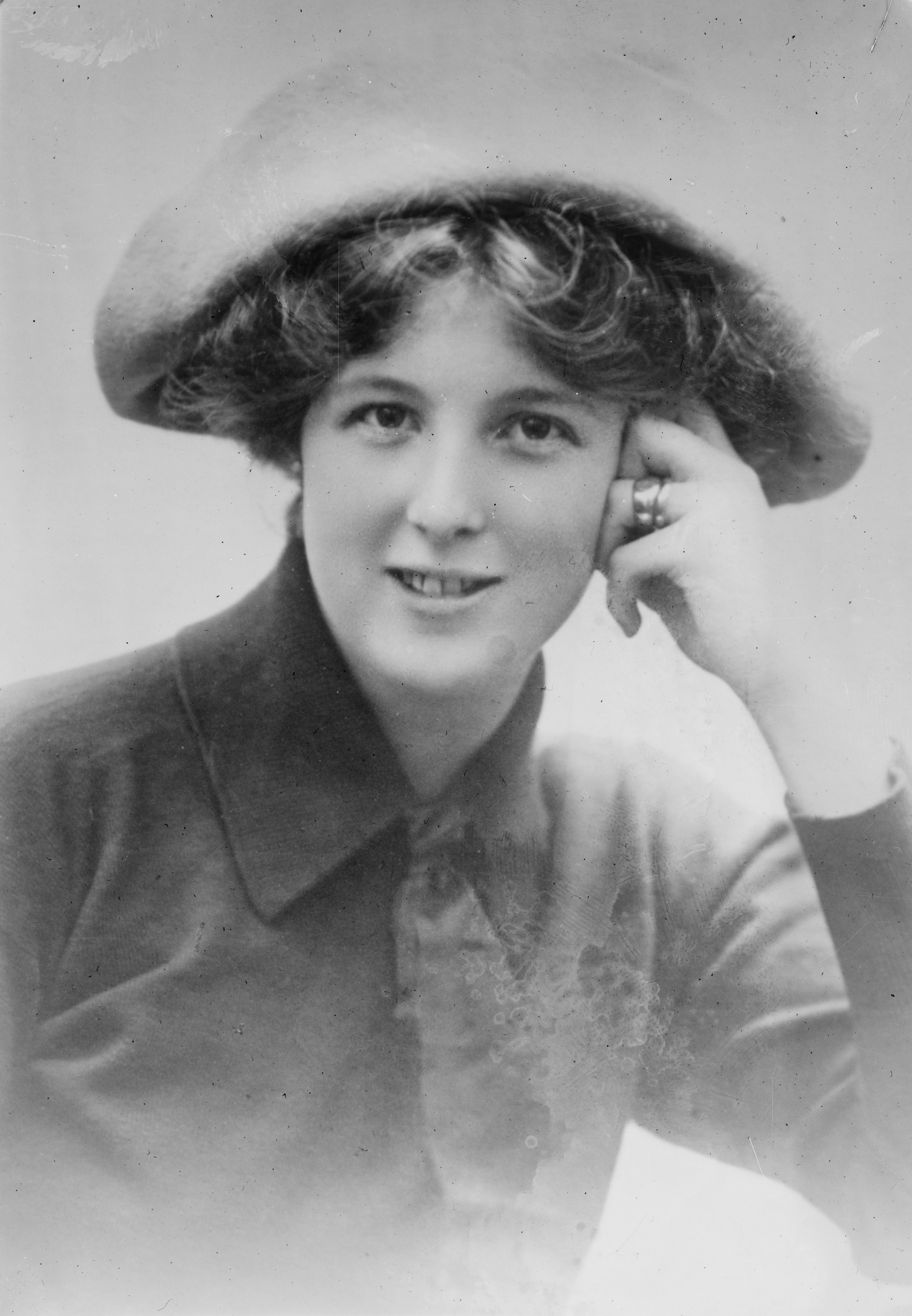
- Portrait of Lady Edith Vane-Tempest-Stewart, c. 1918

Personal details
- Born: Edith Helen Chaplin; 3 December 1878 Blankney, Lincolnshire, England
- Died: 23 April 1959 (aged 80) Mount Stewart, County Down, Northern Ireland
- Spouse: Charles Vane-Tempest-Stewart, 7th Marquess of Londonderry (m. 1899; died 1949)
- Children: Lady Maureen Vane-Tempest-Stewart; Robin Vane-Tempest-Stewart, 8th Marquess of Londonderry; Lady Margaret Vane-Tempest-Stewart; Lady Helen Vane-Tempest-Stewart; Lady Mairi Vane-Tempest-Stewart
- Parent(s): Henry Chaplin, 1st Viscount Chaplin; Lady Florence Sutherland-Leveson-Gower

Edith Helen Vane-Tempest-Stewart, Marchioness of Londonderry (née Chaplin; 3 December 1878 – 23 April 1959), was a noted and influential society hostess in the United Kingdom between World War I and World War II, a friend of the first Labour prime minister, Ramsay MacDonald. She was a noted gardener and a writer and editor of the works of others.

== Early life ==
Born as Edith Helen Chaplin in Blankney, Lincolnshire, she was the daughter of Henry Chaplin (1840–1923), landowner and Conservative politician and later created Viscount Chaplin, and Lady Florence Sutherland-Leveson-Gower (1855–1881). After the death of her mother in 1881, Edith was raised largely at Dunrobin Castle, Sutherland, the estate of her maternal grandfather, the 3rd Duke of Sutherland.

== Public works ==
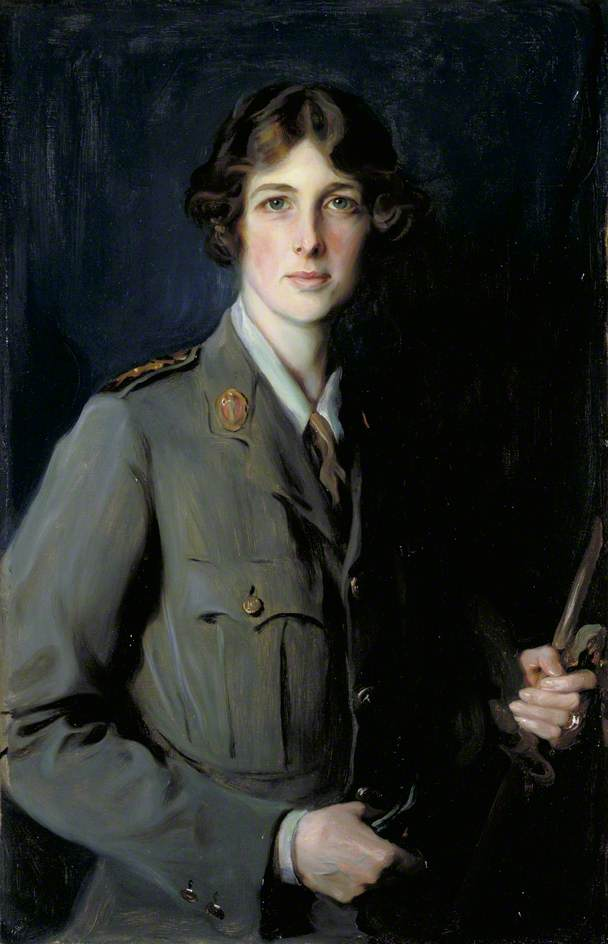
Lady Londonderry in the uniform of the Women's Legion pictured by Philip de László, 1918

In 1903 she was one of the founding members and member of the first committee of the Ladies Automobile Club.

In 1914, after the outbreak of World War I, she was appointed the Colonel-in-Chief of the Women's Volunteer Reserve (WVR), a volunteer force formed of women replacing the men who had left work and gone up to the Front. The WVR was established in December 1914 in response to German bombing raids on East Coast towns during the First World War

Lady Londonderry also aided with the organisation of the Officers' Hospital set up in her house, and was the first woman to be appointed to be a Dame Commander of the Order of the British Empire in the Military Division, upon the Order's establishment in 1917.

Lady Londonderry's friendship with Prime Minister Ramsay MacDonald, although platonic, was a source of gossip in her time and has since become an iconic friendship of English social history.

In 1935 she helped to establish the Women's Gas Council, as its first president, assisted by organising secretary Katherine Halpin.

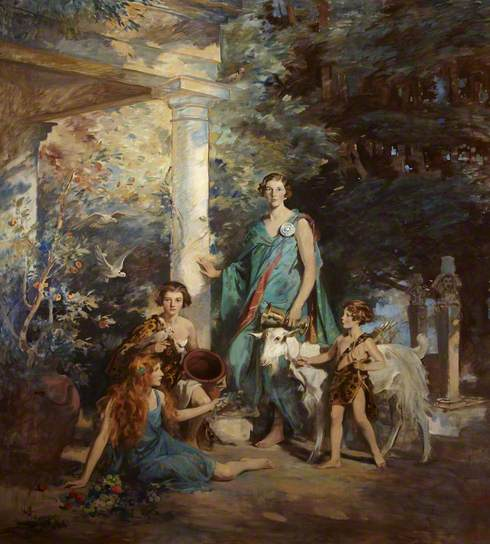
Circe and the Sirens: Group Portrait of the Hon. Edith Chaplin, Marchioness of Londonderry, and Her Three Youngest Daughters, Charles Edmond Brock.

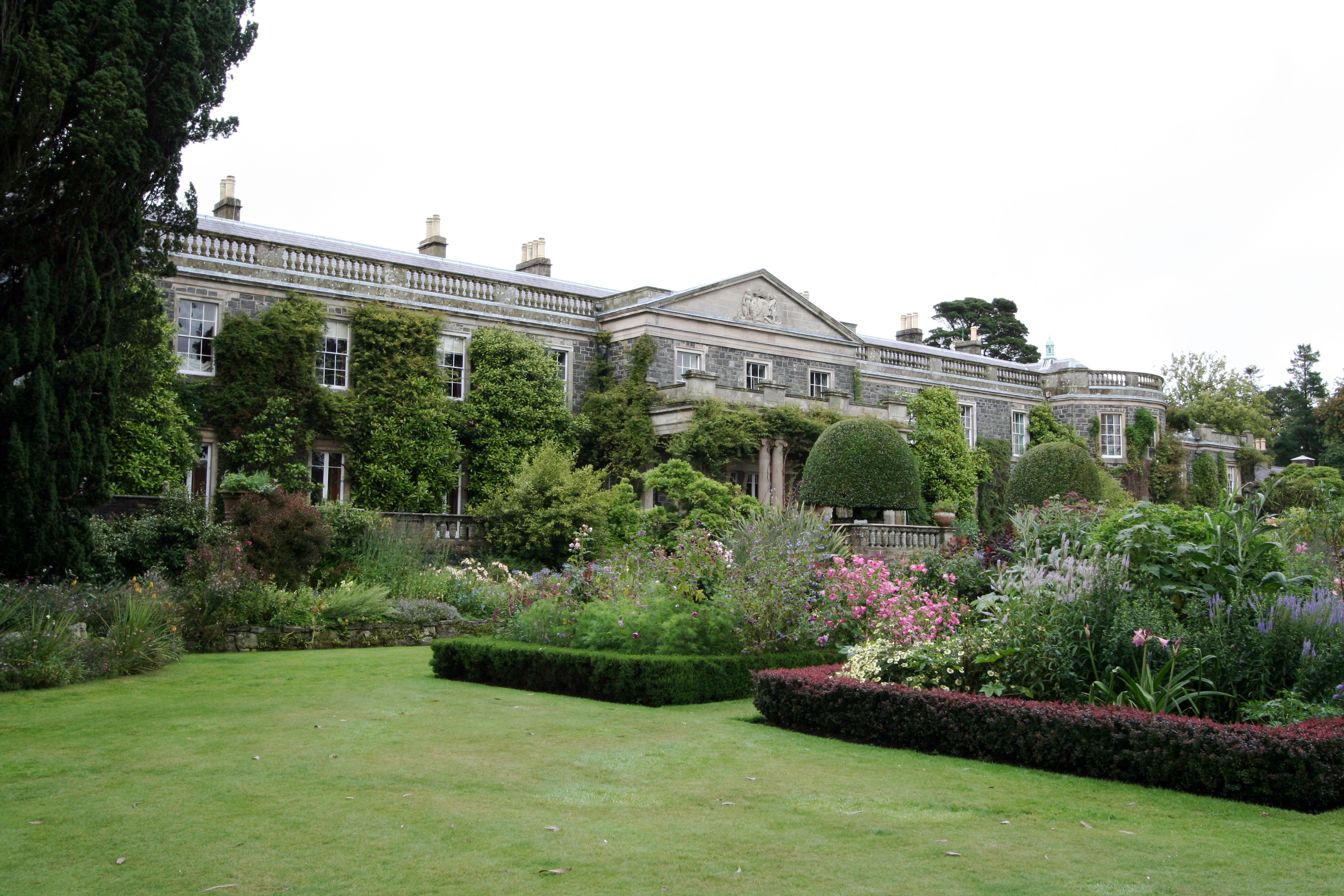
Characteristically luxuriant planting contained within formally clipped edging

=== Gardens ===
When her father-in-law died in 1915, her husband inherited the title, whereupon Edith became Marchioness of Londonderry. This made her chatelaine of several large houses designed for entertaining, notably Londonderry House, the family's London townhouse in Mayfair, and Mount Stewart, the family seat in County Down. They also owned other properties such as Seaham Hall and Wynward Park in County Durham, and Plas Machynlleth in Wales.

During the 1920s, Lady Londonderry created the gardens at the Londonderry family estate of Mount Stewart, near Newtownards, County Down. Supported by Derbyshire born Head Gardener Thomas Bolas, she added the Shamrock Garden, the Sunken Garden, increased the size of the lake, added a Spanish Garden with a small hut, the Italian Garden, the Dodo Terrace, Menagerie, the Fountain Pool and laid out walks in the Lily Wood and rest of the estate. This dramatic change led to the gardens being proposed as a UNESCO World Heritage Site. She was a patron of the botanist and plant collector Frank Kingdon-Ward.

After she created her garden and the death of her husband, she gave the gardens to the National Trust in 1957. They are regarded by Heritage Island as being one of the best gardens in Britain and Ireland.

== Personal life ==
On 28 November 1899, she married Charles Vane-Tempest-Stewart, Viscount Castlereagh. They were both 21. She married into a prominent land-owning and political family. Her husband was a soldier in World War I and is best remembered for his tenure as Secretary of State for Air in the 1930s, preserving the Royal Air Force against cuts, and for his praise of Nazi Germany in the 1930s. He was forced out of the government in 1935 and never returned. Together, they were the parents of five children:

- Lady Maureen Helen Vane-Tempest-Stewart (1900–1942), who married Oliver Stanley.
- Edward Charles Stewart Robert Vane-Tempest-Stewart (1902–1955), who was known as Robin and who became the 8th Marquess of Londonderry. He married Romaine Combe in 1931.
- Lady Margaret Frances Anne Vane-Tempest-Stewart (1910–1966), who married firstly Alan Muntz, and secondly Hugh Falkus.
- Lady Helen Maglona Vane-Tempest-Stewart (1911–1986), who married firstly Edward Jessel, 2nd Baron Jessel; secondly, Dennis Whittington Walsh; and, thirdly, Nigel Sundius-Hill.
- Lady Mairi Elizabeth Vane-Tempest-Stewart (1921–2009), who married Derek Keppel, Viscount Bury (1911–1968).

On the death of the 7th Marquess, in 1949, Lady Londonderry became Dowager Marchioness of Londonderry. Lady Londonderry died of cancer on 23 April 1959, aged 80.

=== Descendants and legacy ===
One of Lady Londonderry's grandchildren, Annabel Goldsmith, was also a noted London socialite.

A number of gifts received by Lady Londonderry from Queen Mary, Sir Philip Sassoon and others were auctioned at Sotheby's in 2012.

== Published works ==
Lady Londonderry wrote and/or edited several books, among which are:

- Henry Chaplin: A Memoir (1926). (Note: A memoir of her father, who was squire of Blankney and effectively the country's first minister of agriculture.)
- The Magic Ink-Pot (1928). (Note: A collection of children's stories with an Ulster flavour.)
- The Russian journals of Martha and Catherine Wilmot : being an account by two Irish ladies of their adventures in Russia as guests of the celebrated Princess Daschkaw, containing vivid descriptions of contemporary court life and society, and lively anecdotes of many interesting historical characters, 1803-1808 (1934). (Note: Lady Londonderry, with the Ulster barrister H. Montgomery Hyde, edited the letters and journals of Catherine Wilmot and her sister Martha. Catherine had travelled on the Continent with Lord and Lady Mount Cashell, and Martha had spent several years in Russia almost as the adopted daughter of Princess Dashkova, the favourite of Catherine the Great. The society life that the sisters depict is like War and Peace.)
- Retrospect (1938). (Note: Lady Londonderry's autobiography.)
- Frances Anne: The Life and Times of Frances Anne, Marchioness of Londonderry, and Her Husband, Charles, Third Marquess of Londonderry (1958). (Note: A memoir of Lady Londonderry's husband's great-grandparents.)

== Ancestry ==
Ancestors of Edith Vane-Tempest-Stewart, Marchioness of Londonderry

16. John Chaplin, of Blankney, Lincolnshire
8. Charles Chaplin, of Blankney, Lincolnshire
17. Lady Elizabeth Cecil
4. Reverend Henry Chaplin, of Blankney, Lincolnshire
18. Robert Taylor
9. Elizabeth Taylor
2. Henry Chaplin, 1st Viscount Chaplin
10. William Ellice
5. Carolina Horatia Ellice
1. Edith Vane-Tempest-Stewart, Marchioness of Londonderry
24. George Leveson-Gower, 1st Duke of Sutherland
12. George Sutherland-Leveson-Gower, 2nd Duke of Sutherland
25. Elizabeth Gordon, 19th Countess of Sutherland
6. George Sutherland-Leveson-Gower, 3rd Duke of Sutherland
26. George Howard, 6th Earl of Carlisle
13. Lady Harriet Howard
27. Lady Georgiana Cavendish
3. Lady Florence Sutherland-Leveson-Gower
28. Edward Hay-Mackenzie of Newhall and Cromartie
14. John Hay-Mackenzie
29. The Hon. Maria Murray-Mackenzie
7. Anne Hay-Mackenzie, 1st Countess of Cromartie
30. Sir James Gibson-Craig, 1st Baronet
15. Anne Gibson-Craig
31. Anne Thomson
