= Malcolm Falkus =

English economic historian

Malcolm Edward Falkus
- Born: 13 January 1940; Westcliff-on-Sea, Essex, England
- Died: 28 November 2017 (aged 77); Arrandale Lodge 431 Earlham Road Norwich, Norfolk, England
- Education: London School of Economics
- Occupation: Economic historian
- Years active: 1966–2000
- Employer(s): London School of Economics, Department of Economic History University of New England Australia
- Known for: Author and Professor of Economic History

Malcolm Edward Falkus (13 January 1940 – 28 November 2017) was an English economic historian and academic. He was a lecturer at the London School of Economics, and a former professor and head of the Department of Economic History at the University of New England, New South Wales, Australia. In 2008, he was charged for underage sex with boys in Thailand but evaded prosecution.

== Early life ==
Malcolm Edward Falkus was born on 13 January 1940 in Westcliff-on-Sea Essex England, the son of the writer, filmmaker and presenter Hugh Falkus and Doris Marjorie Falkus (née Walter). He and his twin brother, the publisher Christopher Hugh Falkus, were educated at The Marist Convent School in Paignton, Devon and then at St Boniface's Catholic College, Plymouth.

== Career ==
Falkus took a first class degree at the London School of Economics where he subsequently became a lecturer in economic history. While at the LSE he published several significant scholarly works on economic and social history including The Industrialisation of Russia, 1700-1914 (1972) and Britain Transformed: an Economic and Social History, 1700-1914 (1987). In the 1980s and 1990s Falkus was commissioned to write several remunerated corporate histories. A history of North Thames Gas was originally planned in 1982 and a version was ready by 1985. However, in the wake of the UK Government’s decision to privatise the gas industry publication was delayed until 1988 so that the entire history of the public ownership of North Thames Gas from 1949 to 1986 could be covered. Other corporate histories were of the accountancy firm Coopers and Lybrand (1993) and the Blue Funnel Steam Ship Company (1995).

In 1988, he succeeded Ron Neal as professor of economic history in Department of Economic History at the University of New England, Armidale, Australia. Falkus was instrumental in the development of the Department as a major centre for study of Asian economics. He became the first Director of the UNE-Asia Centre (UNEAC). Falkus was the general editor of the two book series ‘Studies in the Economies of East and South Asia’ and ‘A Modern Economic History of Southeast Asia’.

Falkus retired from UNEAC on his 60th birthday (13 January 2000) and went to live in Thailand. He claimed that he compiled a Thai-Khmer dictionary, for which no reference is available. In 2001, he was commissioned by the World Bank to compile a series of labour law manuals for Cambodia. He moved to Pattaya, Thailand in 2004. In June 2008, Falkus was arrested in Pattaya and charged with paying 12-year-old boys for sex, and was bailed on a surety of 200,000 baht. He denied being either gay or a pedophile and stated he never lured young boys anywhere and for any purposes. He evaded prosecution and went to Cambodia. This was not Falkus's first brush with the law. In January 1974, while he was at the London School of Economics, he was charged with the theft of old banknotes from Lloyds of London. The steady supply of such notes to collectors ceased immediately when Falkus was charged and no longer had access to the Lloyds archives. In January 1976 he went to trial by judge alone at the Old Bailey. Falkus claimed he bought the notes that he sold to collectors from an anonymous man in a pub and was acquitted despite strong contrary evidence.

== Later life ==
Falkus returned to the UK and lived in Norwich, Norfolk. On 28 November 2017, Falkus was found hanged by the neck (aged 77) at his home in Arrandale Lodge Earlham Road Norwich. The Norfolk Coroner opened an inquest on 2 February 2018, and an in camera inquiry hearing was held on 2 October 2018 when the coroner gave a verdict of suicide. His funeral service was held at St George’s Catholic parish on 11 December 2017. He died intestate and administration of his estate was granted in London on 19 March 2018.

== Works ==
=== Books ===
- Malcolm Falkus, Readings in the History of Economic Growth a Study of Successful and Promising Beginnings, of Special Relevance for Students in Underdeveloped Countries, Oxford, Oxford University Press, 1968.
- Malcolm Falkus, The Industrialisation of Russia, 1700-1914 (Studies in Economic History), Palgrave, 1972, ISBN 9780333116494.
- Eleanora & Philippe Jullian, Malcolm Falkus & Paolo Monelli Bairati, La Belle Epoque: Fifteen Euphoric Years of European History, New York, William Morrow, 1978, ISBN 9780688033279.
- Malcolm Falkus, Britain Transformed: an Economic and Social History, 1700-1914, Ormskirk, Causeway Press, 1987, ISBN 9780946183357.
- Malcolm Falkus and John Gillingham, Historical Atlas of Britain, London, Kingfisher Books, 1987, ISBN 9780862722944.
- Malcolm Falkus, Always under Pressure: a History of North Thames Gas since 1949, Basingstoke, Macmillan, 1988, ISBN 9780333468197.
- Malcolm Falkus, The Blue Funnel Legend: History of the Ocean Steam Ship Company, 1865-1973, Basingstoke, Palgrave Macmillan, 1990, ISBN 9780333522837.
- Malcolm Falkus, Called To Account: a History of Coopers & Lybrand in Australia, Sydney, Allen & Unwin, 1993, ISBN 9781863734394.
- Malcolm Falkus, Growth, Distribution and Political Change, Basingstoke, Palgrave Macmillan, 1999, ISBN 9781349143580.
- Ryoshin Minami, Kwan S. Kim and Malcolm Falkus (editors), Growth, Distribution and Political Change: Asia and the Wider World (Studies in the Economies of East and South Asia), London, St. Martin's Press, 1999, ISBN 9780312222673.
