= Londonderry House =

Former building in London

Coordinates: 51°30′20″N 0°9′1″W

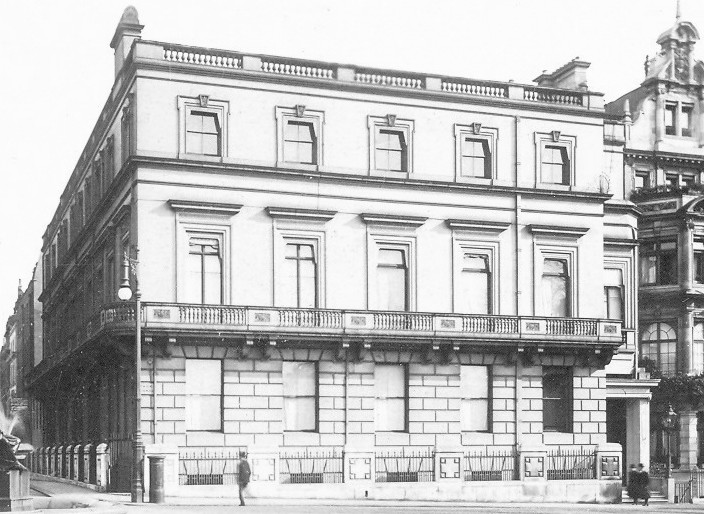
Londonderry House, c. 1900

Londonderry House was an aristocratic townhouse situated on Park Lane in the Mayfair district of London, England. The mansion served as the London residence of the Marquesses of Londonderry. It remained their London home until 1962. In that year, Londonderry House was sold by the Trustees of the 7th Marquess of Londonderry's Will Trust to a developer who built the "Londonderry Hotel" on the site, not (as is sometimes, erroneously, stated) the Hilton. The Hilton Hotel is on the other side of the street, and had already been opened. COMO Metropolitan London now occupies the site of Londonderry House.

== History ==
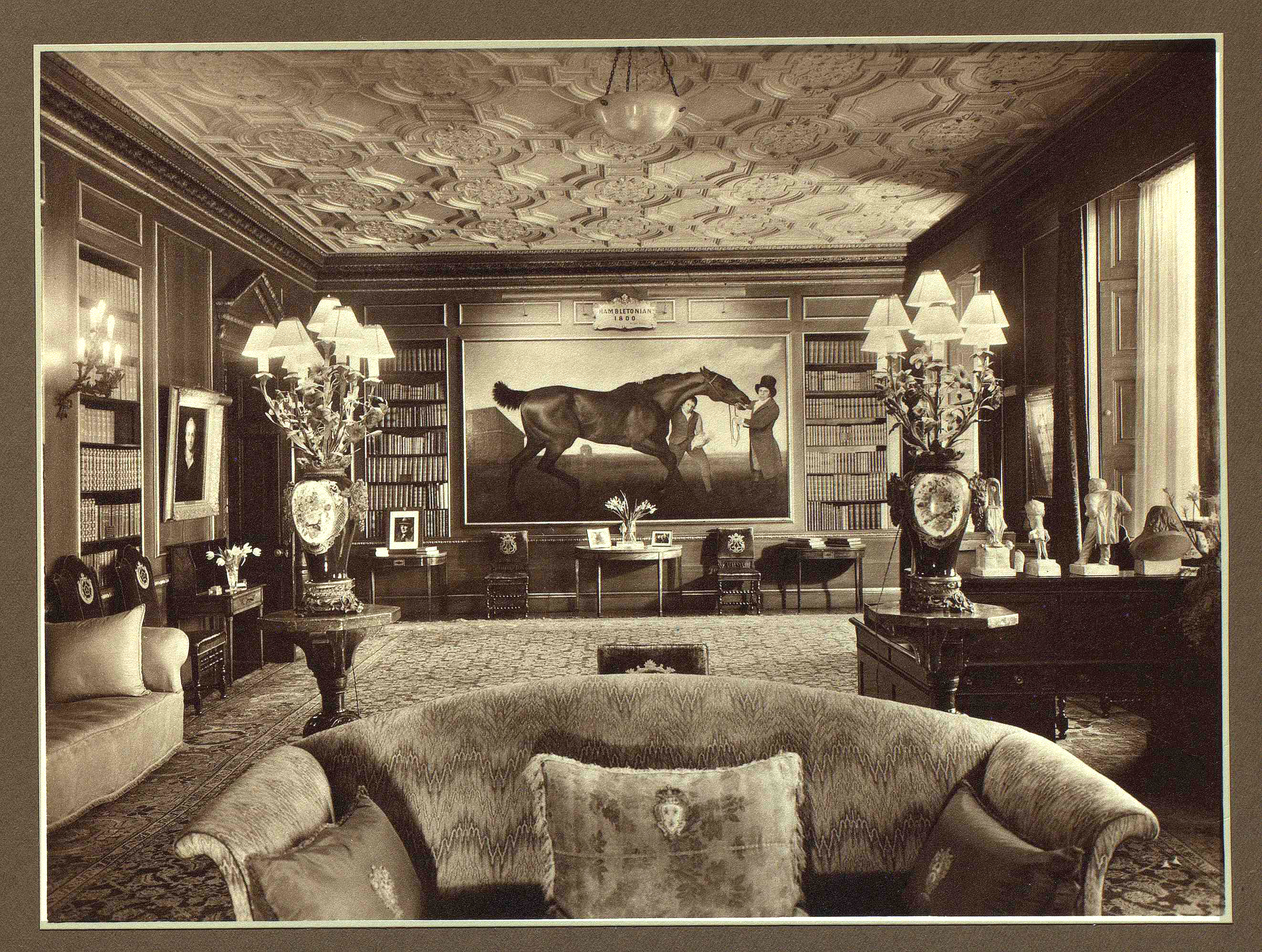
The library, 1920s

Holderness House, later Londonderry House, was designed by James "Athenian" Stuart for Robert Darcy, 4th Earl of Holderness in the period c. 1760–5, with ceilings based on Robert Wood's Ruins of Palmyra. The Earl is thought to have acquired the building next door as well, but at a later date. He subsequently joined the two so that the house became a double-fronted London mansion.

The residence was purchased in 1819 by Charles Vane, 1st Baron Stewart, an Irish aristocrat, to serve as a home whilst the family stayed in London during the annual social season. Soon after the purchase, Lord Stewart began redecorating and spared no expense, as shown by his choice of architects: Benjamin Dean Wyatt and Philip Wyatt. In 1822, Lord Stewart became the 3rd Marquess of Londonderry. By 1835, the home's transformation was complete. Some half a century later, in 1882–83, George Vane-Tempest, 5th Marquess of Londonderry commissioned James Brooks to build, in red brick with terracotta facings, a handsome new stable yard, coach houses, and accommodation for the stable staff of Londonderry House, arranged around an internal courtyard (all of which were accessible via wide double doors opening on to Brick Street).

Prince Louis-Napoléon Bonaparte (later Emperor Napoleon III) often visited Londonderry House while exiled in London in 1836-40 and 1846–48.

During the First World War, the house was used as a military hospital. After the war, Charles Vane-Tempest-Stewart, 7th Marquess of Londonderry, a prominent Ulster Unionist politician, and his wife, Edith Chaplin, continued to use the house and entertained extensively. After the Second World War, the house remained in the possession of the 7th Marquess of Londonderry; in 1946 a lease over most of the building was granted to the Royal Aero Club for a nominal rent, whilst Lord Londonderry's family retained twenty two rooms for their own use. Following the death of the 7th Marquess in 1949, ownership of the house was held in a discretionary trust, and his widow Edith was granted the use of a flat within the house by permission of the Trustees of her late husband's Will, which she retained until her own death in 1959.

=== Sale and demolition ===
The Londonderry age on Park Lane drew to a close after the death of Edith, Dowager Marchioness of Londonderry. The last social events hosted by the family in Londonderry House were the debutante balls of Elizabeth Keppel in 1959 and Rose Keppel in 1961, hosted by their mother, Lady Mairi Bury (youngest daughter of the 7th Marquess); the wedding reception of Elizabeth Keppel, following her marriage to her cousin Alastair Villiers, in June 1962, and a subsequent, final, "farewell" party given by Alastair, 9th Marquess, the following month, for 300 guests, including Mick Jagger and Paul McCartney.

The house was sold at auction by the Trustees of the Estate of the 7th Marquess on 26 July 1962. The purchaser was former Tesco Director Isaac Klug, who purchased the site of Londonderry House (No. 19 Park Lane and 24 Hertford Street) and an adjoining lot at 22-23 Hertford Street (together totalling some 18,000 square feet) for £500,000 on behalf of his family's investment trust Budget Property Co.

The "Londonderry Silver" was mostly bought by the Brighton council for the Royal Pavilion, where it can currently be seen, along with the Ormonde silver. The large statue at the foot of the staircase of Londonderry House, Canova's Theseus and the Minotaur, was bought by the Victoria & Albert Museum. George Stubbs's masterful life-size painting of the racehorse Hambletonian after his famous win at Newmarket was one of the items which belonged to Lady Mairi Bury and it was taken down from the library in Londonderry House and rehung on the staircase of Lady Mairi's own home at Mount Stewart, in County Down, where it is still to be seen today.

== Description ==
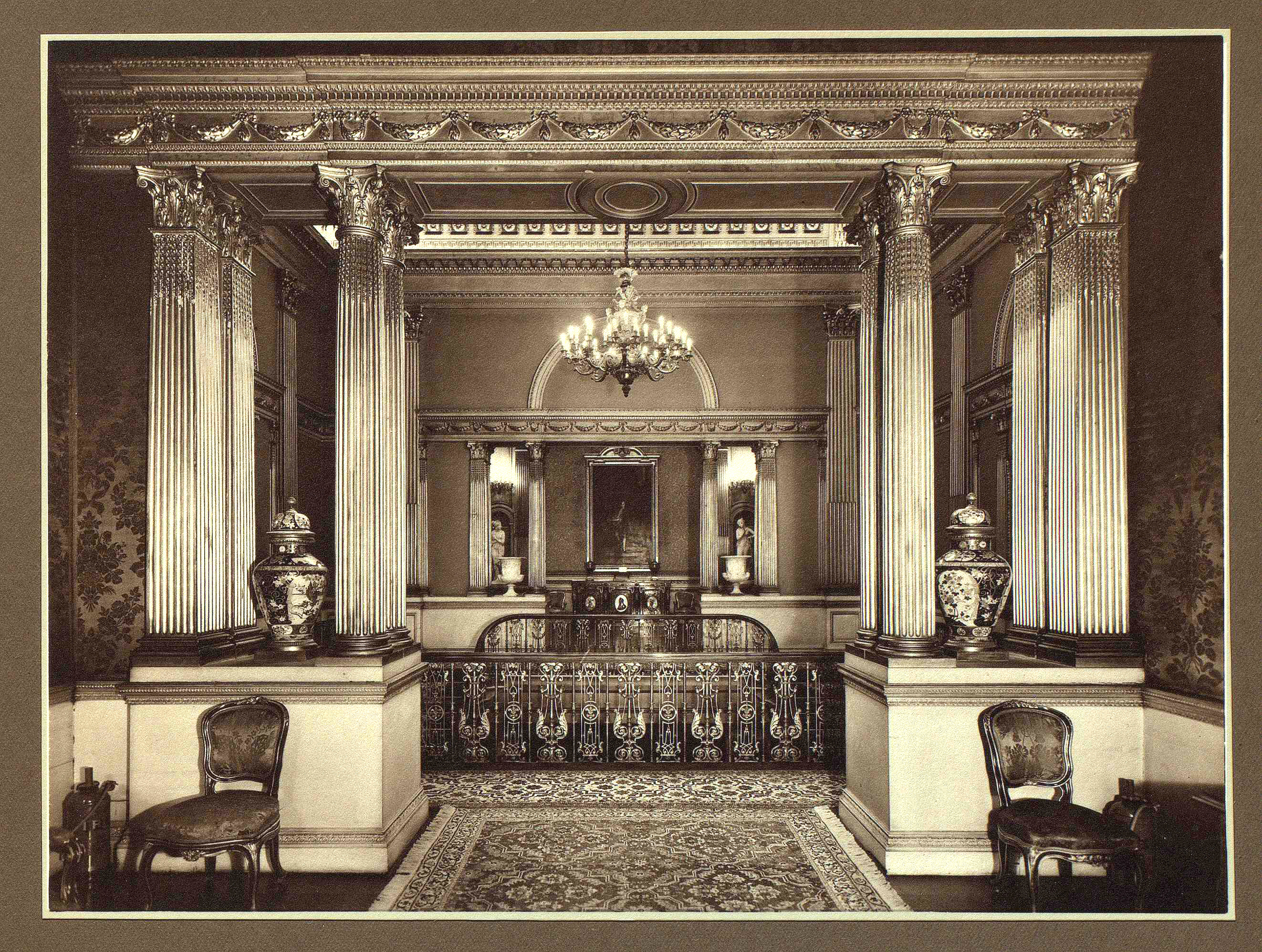
The main stairway (upstairs), 1920s

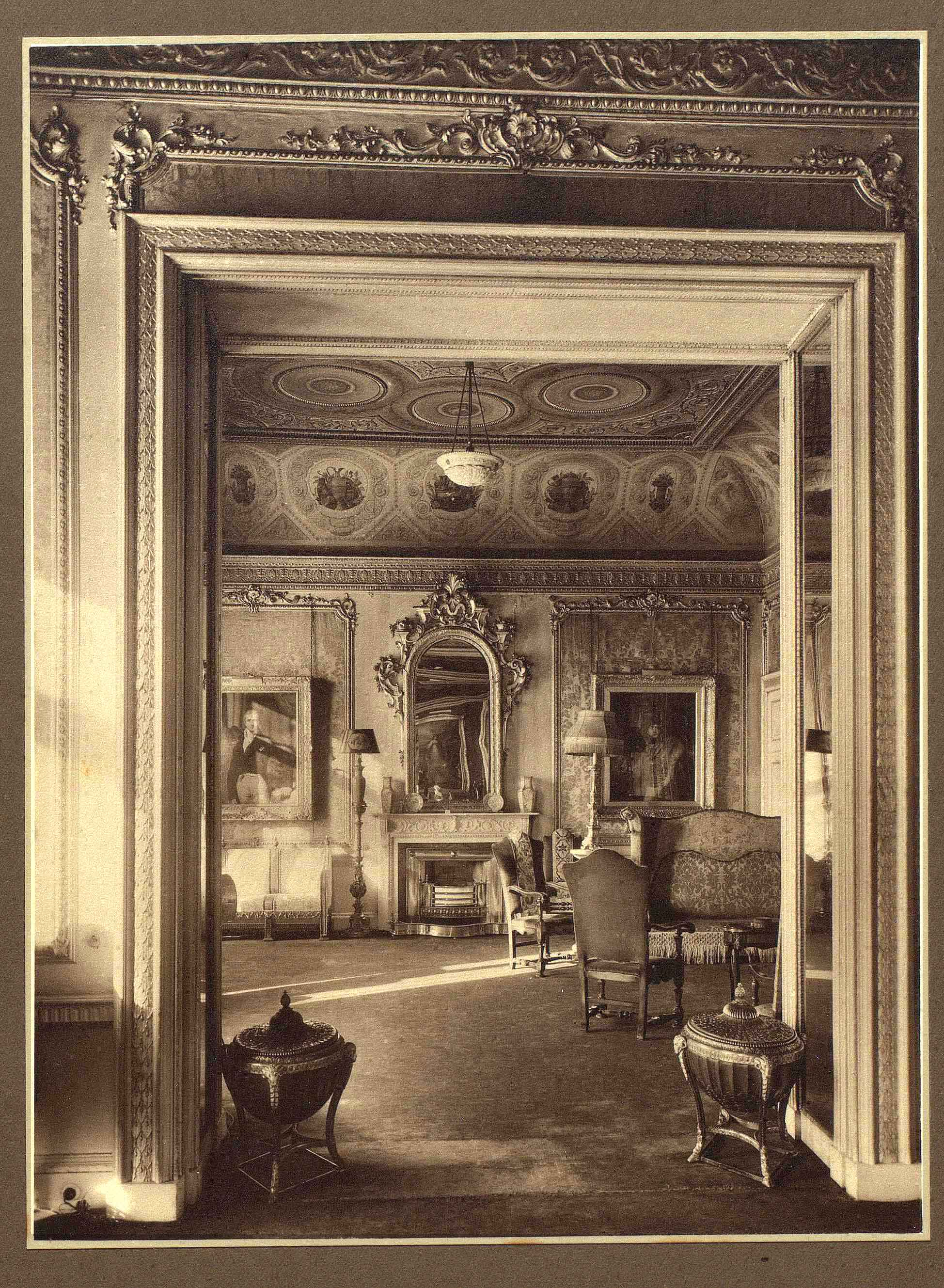
The drawing room, 1920s

The tragedy of the sale of Londonderry House was not the comparatively meagre price (by current standards) it fetched for the Londonderry family, but the fact that this magnificent mansion was then immediately, apart from its stableyard (which still stands, with its separate entrance in Brick Street still surmounted by the coronet of a Marquess), completely demolished. The bland exterior of Londonderry House concealed, for example, the aforementioned magnificently painted, and fresco-ceiling interiors by James "Athenian" Stewart who had, coincidentally, built the Temple of the Winds at the Londonderry's Ulster seat of Mount Stewart. The main stairway was meant to outdo that of Lancaster House in nearby St James's. It succeeded in this: it had a large skylight, Rococo chandelier and two individual flights of stairs flanking each other. This stairway led into the Grand Ballroom which, rather individually, held full-length portraits of the Stewart family men in Garter Robes, by artists such as Sir Thomas Lawrence (who painted the 2nd Marquess) and Glyn Philpot (who depicted the 7th Marquess). Said to have been inspired by the Waterloo Chamber of Apsley House, it also outdid that. Around the room were large marble statues including by Canova and chairs in the French style.

On from that was the Dining Room, which held the Londonderry collection of silver. Another elegant room was the tripartite Drawing Room, which held more Londonderry Silver, French furniture, Old Master paintings (for example The Madonna and Child with a male Donor, a landscape beyond, painted by Giovanni Bellini, which was sold by Lady Mairi Bury in 1977, to provide a capital sum endowment for the National Trust to become involved with the care of Mount Stewart), and ceilings painted with birds.

== See also ==
- Mount Stewart
- Wynyard Park, County Durham
- Plas Machynlleth
- Seaham Hall
- Loring Hall

== Sources and further reading ==
- De Courcy, Anne. Society's Queen: The Life of Edith, Marchioness of Londonderry. London: Phoenix, 2004. ISBN 0-7538-1730-6 (Originally published as Circe: The Life of Edith, Marchioness of Londonderry. London: Sinclair-Stevenson, 1992. ISBN 1-85619-363-2)
- Sykes, Christopher Simon. Private Palaces: Life in the Great London Houses. New York, Viking Penguin Inc 1986. ISBN 0-670-80964-0.
