= Charles Vane-Tempest-Stewart, 7th Marquess of Londonderry =

British peer, soldier and politician (1878–1949)

The Most Honourable The Marquess of Londonderry KG MVO PC PC (Ire)
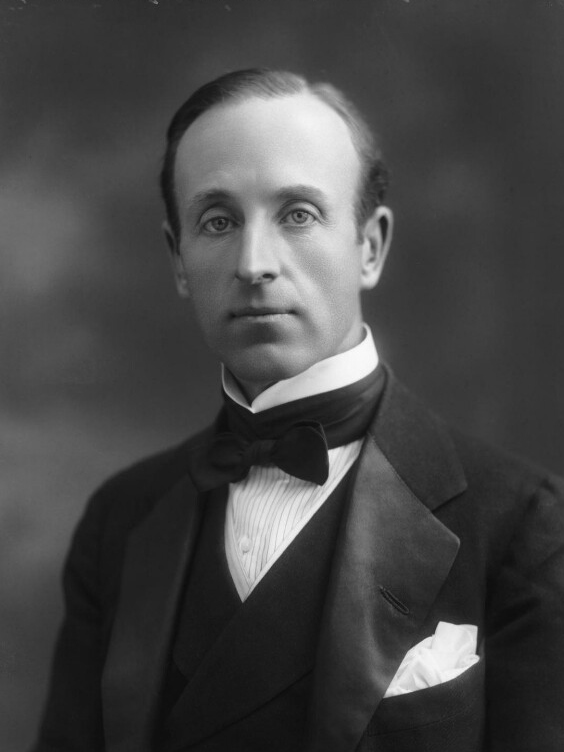
- Londonderry in 1920

Leader of the House of Lords Lord Keeper of the Privy Seal
- In office 7 June 1935 – 22 November 1935
- Monarch: George V
- Prime Minister: Stanley Baldwin
- Preceded by: The Viscount Hailsham (Leader of Lords); Anthony Eden (Lord Privy Seal)
- Succeeded by: The Viscount Halifax

Secretary of State for Air
- In office 5 November 1931 – 7 June 1935
- Monarch: George V
- Prime Minister: Ramsay MacDonald
- Preceded by: The Lord Amulree
- Succeeded by: The Viscount Swinton

First Commissioner of Works
- In office 25 August 1931 – 5 November 1931
- Monarch: George V
- Prime Minister: Ramsay MacDonald
- Preceded by: George Lansbury
- Succeeded by: Hon. William Ormsby-Gore
- In office 18 October 1928 – 4 June 1929
- Monarch: George V
- Prime Minister: Stanley Baldwin
- Preceded by: The Viscount Peel
- Succeeded by: George Lansbury

Minister of Education for Northern Ireland
- In office 7 June 1921 – 8 January 1926
- Monarch: George V
- Prime Minister: James Craig
- Governor: The Duke of Abercorn
- Preceded by: Office established
- Succeeded by: The Viscount Charlemont

Parliamentary Under-Secretary of State for Air
- In office 2 April 1920 – 18 July 1921
- Monarch: George V
- Prime Minister: David Lloyd George
- Preceded by: George Tryon
- Succeeded by: The Lord Gorell

Member of the Senate of Northern Ireland
- In office 7 June 1921 – 6 June 1929
- Preceded by: Office established
- Succeeded by: John McHugh

Member of the House of Lords Lord Temporal
- In office 9 February 1915 – 10 February 1949; Hereditary Peerage
- Preceded by: The 6th Marquess of Londonderry
- Succeeded by: The 8th Marquess of Londonderry

Member of Parliament for Maidstone
- In office 8 February 1906 – 8 February 1915
- Preceded by: Sir Francis Evans
- Succeeded by: Carlyon Bellairs

Personal details
- Born: Charles Stewart Henry Vane-Tempest-Stewart; 13 May 1878
- Died: 10 February 1949 (aged 70) Mount Stewart, County Down
- Party: Conservative; Ulster Unionist
- Spouse: Hon. Edith Chaplin (m. 1899)
- Children: Lady Maureen Vane-Tempest-Stewart; Robin Vane-Tempest-Stewart, 8th Marquess of Londonderry; Lady Margaret Vane-Tempest-Stewart; Lady Helen Vane-Tempest-Stewart; Lady Mairi Vane-Tempest-Stewart; Dorothé Mabel Lewis
- Parent(s): Charles Vane-Tempest-Stewart, 6th Marquess of Londonderry; Lady Theresa Chetwynd-Talbot
- Education: Royal Military College, Sandhurst

Charles Stewart Henry Vane-Tempest-Stewart, 7th Marquess of Londonderry KG, MVO, PC, PC (Ire) (13 May 1878 – 10 February 1949), styled Lord Stewart until 1884 and Viscount Castlereagh between 1884 and 1915, was a British peer and politician. He is best remembered in Great Britain for his tenure as Secretary of State for Air in the 1930s and for his attempts to reach an understanding with Nazi Germany. In 1935, he was removed from the Air Ministry but retained in the Cabinet as Lord Privy Seal and Leader of the House of Lords. In Ireland, especially within Ulster, Lord Londonderry is best remembered for his opposition to Home Rule for Ireland in the early twentieth century.

== Background and education ==
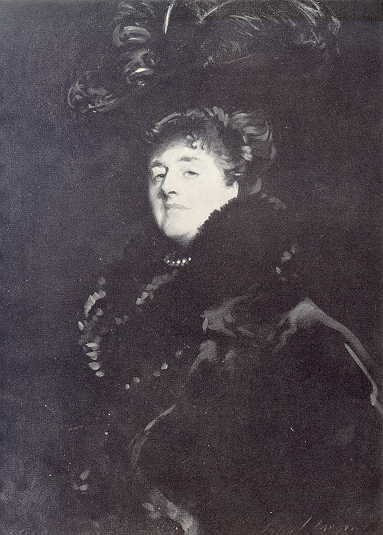
His mother, Theresa ('Nellie'), Marchioness of Londonderry, John Singer Sargent, 1912

The eldest son of Charles, 6th Marquess of Londonderry, and Lady Theresa Chetwynd-Talbot, a daughter of the 19th Earl of Shrewsbury, he was educated at Eton and at the Royal Military College, Sandhurst. His father's family was partly of Donegal Ulster-Scots descent.

== Early career ==
On 22 May 1895, Lord Castlereagh was appointed a second lieutenant in the 2nd (Seaham) Durham Artillery Volunteer Corps, a corps within the Volunteer Force attached to the Royal Garrison Artillery (Western Division) and at the time commanded by his father who owned Seaham Colliery from which many of the part-time gunners were recruited. After passing out from Sandhurst, he was commissioned into the Royal Horse Guards as a second lieutenant on 8 September 1897. He was promoted lieutenant on 30 August 1899, and appointed adjutant on 9 May 1900.

In early 1901 he was appointed by King Edward VII to take part in a special diplomatic mission to announce the King's accession to the governments of Austria-Hungary, Romania, Serbia, and Turkey. In August 1903, following the King's visit to Ireland, he was appointed a Member Fourth Class (present-day Lieutenant) of the Royal Victorian Order, his father being honoured with the Knight Grand Cross of the Order at the same time. He resigned his position of adjutant in the Royal Horse Guards on 24 March 1904, and was promoted to captain on 6 April.

Castlereagh was subsequently pressed by his parents to stand for election to the House of Commons at the 1906 general election for Maidstone. He retained his army commission but was placed on the half-pay list from January 1910. His relatively unsuccessful career on the depleted Unionist backbenches was broken by a return to the British Army during the First World War.

== First World War ==
As Captain Castlereagh MP he travelled to northern France in the first weeks of the war and reached Paris on 29 August 1914, having been gazetted ADC to General William Pulteney the previous day. Although a staff officer, Castlereagh immediately saw plenty of fighting and believed he had shot and killed one of the enemy on 2 September 1914. In the following months of 1914, Castlereagh extensively witnessed the destruction of war and the terrible suffering of the British wounded. He was promoted to the temporary rank of major in his old regiment on 1 November, and to the substantive rank on the 7th.

Hitherto reluctant to involve himself, like his father, in Irish politics, the war prompted him to take up the cause of recruitment in Ireland. With his father's death in February 1915, he ceased to be MP for Maidstone and inherited the Londonderry title and the immense wealth and status that went with it. His exalted position helped his political career, not least in Ireland, which later brought him favourable attention from the British government. In 1915, Lord Londonderry (as he had now become) ll, was mentioned in despatches and rejoined his regiment, the Royal Horse Guards (The Blues). He saw in 1915 for the first time the horrific effects of gas attack upon human beings when visiting soldiers gassed at the first Battle of Ypres.

In 1916 Londonderry was appointed second-in-command of The Blues, part of the 8th Cavalry Brigade. He served at the front during the Battle of the Somme, witnessing the mass slaughter first-hand; his closest friend, Lieutenant Colonel Harold Brassey, best man at his wedding in 1899, was killed. He was an acting lieutenant colonel from 15 December 1916 to 20 January 1917.

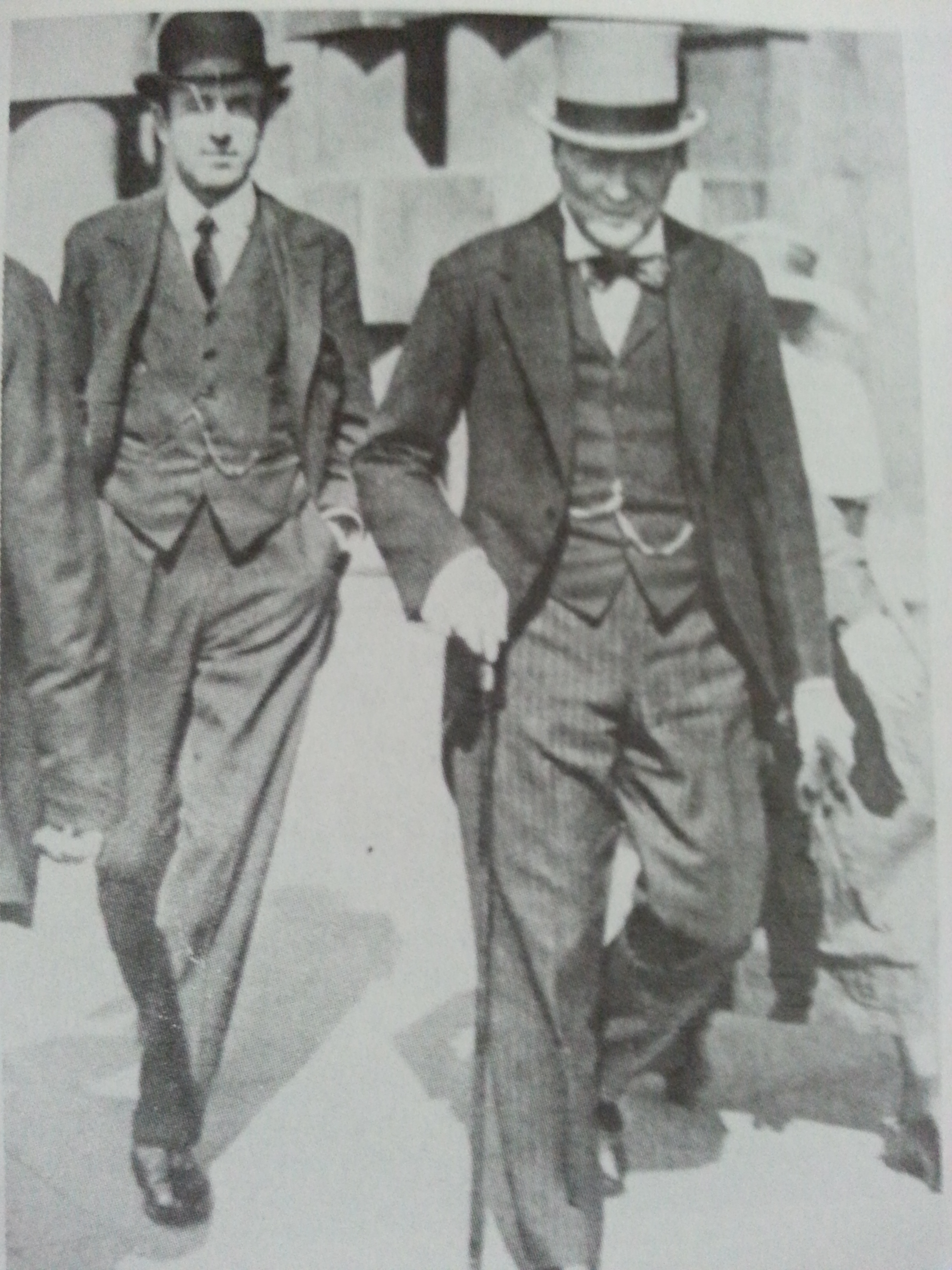
Londonderry with his cousin Winston Churchill in 1920, as Under-Secretary of State for Air

In 1917, Londonderry took command of a composite battalion drawn from the 8th Cavalry Brigade with the brevet rank of Lt-Colonel, and the Royal Horse Guards (The Blues) took part in the massed mounted cavalry attacks on Monchy-le-Preux on the morning of 11 April 1917, during the Battle of Arras. Monchy-le-Preux was one of the keys to the northern end of the Hindenburg Line. While reconnoitring the enemy near Monchy the GOC 8th Cavalry Brigade, Brigadier-General Charles Bulkeley-Johnson, was shot in the face; he fell with a piercing shriek, the thirtieth British General to be killed in action or to die of wounds on the Western Front. This put Brevet Lt-Colonel Londonderry temporarily in command of the 8th Cavalry Brigade during their charge in the Battle of Arras. At Monchy 600 cavalrymen were casualties and many more horses died. The animals were tethered in the open, as their riders took cover; attempts to take them to the rear during a "box barrage" only increased the casualties. For Londonderry, the experiences of war and the carnage of his brother officers and the family and school friends he grew up with would, as Ian Kershaw commented, "leave an indelible mark on him".

After serving in the Irish Convention of 1917–18, Lord Londonderry served on the short-lived Viceroy's Advisory Council, meeting at Dublin Castle in the autumn of 1918. Promoted to brevet lieutenant-colonel on 7 November 1918, he retired from the army on 10 September 1919 as a major and brevet lieutenant-colonel.

On 13 August 1920, he was appointed Honorary Colonel of the 55th Medium Brigade, Royal Garrison Artillery in the Territorial Army, the successor unit to his father's 2nd (Seaham) Durham Artillery Volunteers. He continued in that role until World War II, after it had been converted into the 63rd (Northumbrian) Anti-Aircraft Regiment, Royal Artillery in Anti-Aircraft Command.

== In the Northern Ireland cabinet ==
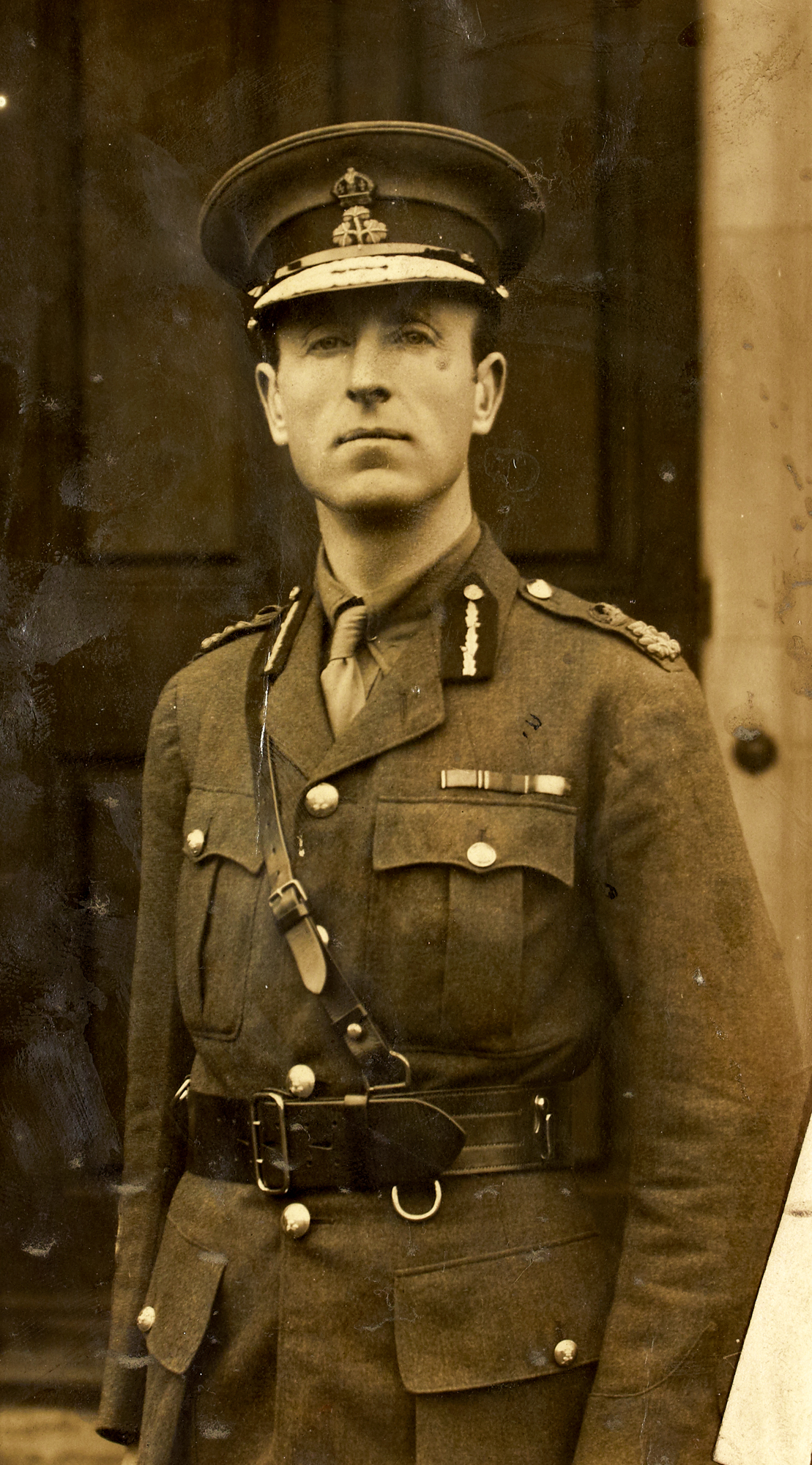
The Marquess, c.1921

He was appointed to the new Air Council at Westminster in 1919 by the postwar coalition government. Promoted to Under-Secretary of State for Air in 1920, Londonderry was nevertheless frustrated and took advantage of his Ulster connections to join the first Cabinet of the Government of Northern Ireland in June 1921, as Leader of the Senate of Northern Ireland and Minister of Education for Northern Ireland. Londonderry was particularly interested in education, and favoured a secularised interest, not the least as a way to end Catholic education. Lord Londonderry appointed the Lynn Commission, headed by Robert Lynn, for advice about education. Lynn stated during the commission's hearings his belief that it would be a waste of public funds to teach the Irish language in the schools, a proposal that was widely seen as promoting Unionism, and led to a Catholic boycott of the commission.

In 1923, his Education Act sought to advance the prospect of mixed Protestant-Catholic education by permitting religious instruction only after school hours and with parental consent. Both Protestant and Catholic educational interests objected, and the measure was amended in 1925 to the point that its purpose, to secularise schooling in Northern Ireland, was lost.

In 1926, Londonderry resigned from the Government of Northern Ireland and, in 1929, he left the Parliament of Northern Ireland entirely.

== In the British Cabinet ==
Londonderry was to involve himself in the General Strike of 1926, playing the role of a moderate mine owner, a stance made easier for him by the relative success of the Londonderry mines in County Durham. His performance earned him high praise, and along with the Londonderrys' role as leading political hosts, he was rewarded by Prime Minister Stanley Baldwin with a seat in the Cabinet in 1928 as First Commissioner of Works. Londonderry was invited to join the emergency National Government under Prime Minister Ramsay MacDonald and Lord President Baldwin in 1931. That was the cause of some scandal as MacDonald's many critics accused the erstwhile Labour leader of being too friendly with Edith, Lady Londonderry.

When the National Government won the 1931 General Election he returned to the Cabinet as Secretary of State for Air (Londonderry held a pilot's licence). This position became increasingly important during his tenure, not least due to the deliberations of the League of Nations Disarmament Conference at Geneva. In September 1931, Japan seized the Manchuria region of China, setting up the sham state of Manchukuo while making claims to the effect that the rest of China was in the exclusive Japanese sphere of influence, an interpretation that the Chinese government vehemently objected to. In January 1932, the First Battle of Shanghai began which saw the Japanese bomb much of Shanghai into rubble. The scenes of Shanghai in flames together with the increasingly assertive Japanese claims about China and the Far East in general as within its sphere of influence convinced Londonderry that Britain needed a strong Royal Air Force as the best way to deter Japan from attacking the British empire and to ensure that Britain was prepared for war should Anglo-Japanese relations take a turn for the worse.

Londonderry's record at the Air Ministry has been outlined by a biographer:

He preserved the core of the RAF at a time when even this was under threat from the Treasury. He encouraged the planning of vital new fighter aircraft such as the Hurricane and Spitfire. It was under his tutelage that radar was developed for use by the RAF. The Staff College at Cranwell was opened in the last months of his time as air minister....[But in underestimating the Luftwaffe he was] badly astray over the issue of German air strength in 1934–5.

Londonderry toed the British government's equivocal line on disarmament but opposed in Cabinet any moves that would risk the deterrent value of the Royal Air Force. He was thus attacked by Clement Attlee and the Labour Party and became a liability to the National Government. In the spring of 1935, he was removed from the Air Ministry but retained in the Cabinet as Lord Privy Seal and Leader of the House of Lords. Combined with his role as a leading member of the Anglo-German Fellowship, he attracted the popular nickname of "Londonderry Herr".

== Contacts with Nazi Germany ==
The sense of hurt Lord Londonderry felt at that and accusations that he had misled Baldwin about the strength of Nazi Germany's Luftwaffe led him to seek to clear his reputation as a "warmonger" by engaging in amateur diplomacy. The British historian Richard Griffiths made a distinction between appeasers, a term that he reserved for government officials who believed in appeasement of the Axis states for a variety of reasons, many quite pragmatic, and the enthusiasts for Nazi Germany, which he described a group of individuals who acting on their own as private citizens sought better relations with the Third Reich, usually for ideological reasons. Griffiths defined Londonderry as an enthusiast for Nazi Germany, instead of an appeaser, by noting that after June 1935, Londonderry was speaking mostly for himself when he sought out the company of Nazi leaders. Londonderry joined the Anglo-German Fellowship, a society that sought to bring together elites from Britain and Germany with the aim of forging an Anglo-German alliance.

William Shirer, an American reporter assigned to Berlin in the years leading to the Second World War, referred to Londonderry simply as "an all-out pro-Nazi."

Between January 1936 and September 1938, Londonderry made six visits to Nazi Germany, the first lasting for three weeks, but a seventh invitation that had been accepted for March 1939 was abruptly declined by Londonderry after the Nazi occupation of Prague. From early 1936 onward, Londonderry's public statements about the Third Reich became markedly admiring and sympathetic. In March 1936, Leopold von Hoesch, the German ambassador in London in a report to Berlin called Londonderry "one of those on whom the German government relied for the right opinions".

As part of his amateur diplomacy, at the end of May 1936 Londonderry invited in Joachim von Ribbentrop, the German Ambassador to the Court of St. James's, later the German foreign minister, to his ancestral home in Northern Ireland, Mount Stewart. Ribbentrop is reported to have landed in Newtownards with a "noisy gang of SS men" and the four-day visit became a national newspaper story. Regarded as Hitler's "personal negotiator", Ribbentrop reportedly proposed a "mutual assistance scheme" whereby Germany would guarantee British interests in western Europe and the Mediterranean in return for a free hand in eastern Europe. Londonderry entertained Ribbentrop for a further four days at his family home in County Durham, Wynyard Hall on 13–17 November and accompanied him to briefings with government officials in London.

During the first two visits, prior to the abdication of Edward VIII, whom the Nazis assessed as a supporter, Londonderry was considered an aristocrat of real influence by Hitler. The friendly regard in which Londonderry was held in Berlin was reflected in Hitler indiscreetly informing his guest, in October 1936, of his intended moves both on Czechoslovakia and Poland, years before two invasions happened.

Although Londonderry immediately passed that information regarding Hitler's indicated future direction of German policy on to a member of the British government by a letter to Lord Halifax on 24 December 1936, rearmament was not notably accelerated in Britain. In the end, Londonderry's high-profile promotion of Anglo-German friendship marked him with a far greater slur than what had led him to engage in appeasement in the first place.

== Fall from grace ==
Under attack from anti-Nazis inside and outside Westminster, Lord Londonderry attempted to explain his position by publishing Ourselves and Germany in March 1938. Then, after the Munich Agreement, in October 1938, Londonderry wrote in a letter that he was aware that Hitler was "gradually getting back to the theories which he evolved in prison", when working on Mein Kampf. Londonderry's work was openly anti-semitic, declaring: "I have no great affection for the Jews ... it is possible to trace their participation in most of the international disturbances which have created so much havoc in different countries."

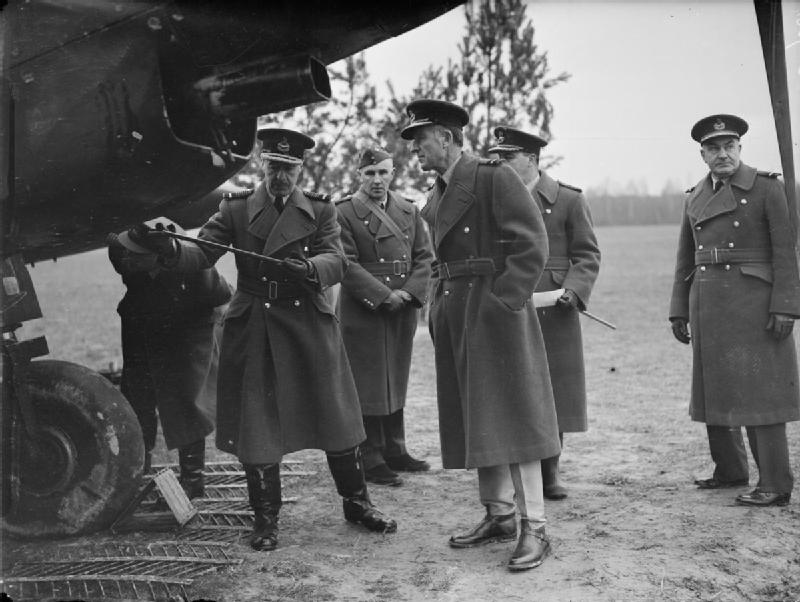
December 1939: Honorary Air Commodore Lord Londonderry (centre) looks on as Air Chief Marshal Sir Cyril Newall, Chief of the Air Staff, inspects an aircraft in France.

When war broke out, alongside the Duke of Westminster, Londonderry lobbied privately for a negotiated peace. He nonetheless, played a minor role in the resignation of Neville Chamberlain as Prime Minister in 1940, but failed to win any favour from the new Prime Minister, Winston Churchill (his second cousin), who thought little of his talents. With talk of his possible internment, Londonderry retreated to Mount Stewart, where he produced Wings of Destiny (1943), a relatively short memoir that was considerably censured by some of his former colleagues, and where he died in 1949.

On the mantlepiece of his smoking room at Mount Stewart, Londonderry retained a memento of his diplomatic démarche: an Allach porcelain figurine of an SS Fahnenträger (SS flag bearer). The gift from Reichmarshall Hermann Göring was neither destroyed nor removed at the outbreak of war.

Lord Londonderry served as Lord Lieutenant of County Down between 1915 and 1949 and of County Durham between 1928 and 1949 and was Chancellor of the University of Durham and The Queen's University of Belfast. He was Mayor of Durham during the year of George VI's Coronation (1937). He was sworn of the Irish Privy Council in 1918, of the Privy Council of Northern Ireland in 1921 and of the Imperial Privy Council in 1925 and appointed a Knight Companion of the Garter in 1919.

== Family ==
On 28 November 1899, Lord Londonderry married the Hon. Edith Helen Chaplin, eldest daughter of Henry Chaplin, 1st Viscount Chaplin, and Lady Florence Sutherland-Leveson-Gower (herself a daughter of the 3rd Duke of Sutherland) at St Peter's Church, Eaton Square and had issue:

- Lady Maureen Helen Vane-Tempest-Stewart (1900–1942), who married in 1920 the Hon. Oliver Stanley and had issue: (i) Michael Charles Stanley (1921–1990), who married (Aileen) Fortune Constance Hugh Smith and had two sons; and (ii) Kathryn Edith Helen Stanley DCVO (1923–2004), Lady-in-Waiting to Queen Elizabeth II from 1955 to 2002 and who married Sir John Dugdale KCVO (1923–1994) and had two daughters and two sons.
- Edward Charles Stewart Robert Vane-Tempest-Stewart, 8th Marquess of Londonderry (1902–1955)
- Lady Margaret Frances Anne Vane-Tempest-Stewart (1910–1966), who married in 1934 (div. 1939) Frederick Alan Irving Muntz and in 1952 (div.1958) as his 3rd wife, Hugh Falkus (1917–1996).
- Lady Helen Maglona Vane-Tempest-Stewart (1911–1986), who married, firstly (of three marriages), in 1935 Edward Jessel, 2nd Baron Jessel, and had issue: (i) Hon. Timothy Edward Jessel (1935–1969) who married twice and had issue; (ii) Hon. Camilla Edith Mairi Elizabeth Jessel (b. 1940) who was married and has issue; and (iii) Hon. Joanna Margaret Jessel (1945-1980) who was married and had issue.
- Lady Mairi Elizabeth Vane-Tempest-Stewart (1921–2009), who married in 1940 (div. 1958) Derek William Charles Keppel, Viscount Bury (1911–1968), eldest son of Walter Keppel, 9th Earl of Albemarle and had issue: (i) Lady Elizabeth Mairi Keppel (1941–2014) who married in 1962 (div.) Alastair Michael Hyde Villiers (1939–2005) and has issue, and in 1980 (div. 1988) Merlin Hanbury-Tracy, 7th Baron Sudeley; and (ii) Lady Rose Deirdre Margaret Keppel (b. 1943) who married Peter Lathrop Lauritzen, son of George F. Lauritzen, of River Forest, Illinois, U.S.A., founder of a food manufacturing, processing and export firm, and has issue.

Lord Londonderry had an illegitimate daughter with actress Fannie Ward, named Dorothé Mabel Lewis (1900–1938). She first married, in 1918, a nephew of mining magnate Barney Barnato, Capt. Jack Barnato, who died of pneumonia shortly after their wedding. Her second husband, whom she married in 1922, was Terence Plunket, 6th Baron Plunket, and with him, she had three sons: Patrick Plunket, 7th Baron Plunket, Robin Plunket, 8th Baron Plunket, and the Hon Shaun Plunket. Lord and Lady Plunket were killed in an aircraft crash in California in 1938.

== Death and estate ==
Having suffered a stroke after a gliding accident a few years after the end of the war, Lord Londonderry died on 10 February 1949 at Mount Stewart, County Down, aged 70.

The gross value of his estate in England was £1,021,754; however the net estate comprised £344,317, from which £110,772 in death duties were paid. The significant difference in the valuation of the gross and net estate was a result of a series of family trusts Lord Londonderry had created which included the Wynyard Hall and Long Newton estates in County Durham.

In his will he noted that he had made adequate financial settlements for his widow and daughters during his lifetime, although he also directed the Trustees of his estate to made sufficient additions to his wife's annual income to allow her to live on £15,000 annually. His widow Edith, Dowager Marchioness of Londonderry was also granted the use of a flat in the family's London home, Londonderry House for her lifetime.

Lord Londonderry bequeathed a life interest in the Mount Stewart estate in Northern Ireland to his widow, with a remainer to their youngest daughter Mairi, Viscountess Bury; the remainder of his fortune and estates were bequeathed to his only son Robin Vane-Tempest-Stewart, 8th Marquess of Londonderry.

Parliament of the United Kingdom
Preceded by Sir Francis Henry Evans, Bt	Member of Parliament for Maidstone; 1906–1915	Succeeded by Carlyon Bellairs
Political offices
Preceded by George Tryon	Under-Secretary of State for Air; 1920–1921	Succeeded by The Lord Gorell
New office	Minister of Education (Northern Ireland); 1921–1926	Succeeded by The Viscount Charlemont
New office	Leader of the Senate of Northern Ireland; 1921–1926	Succeeded by The Viscount Charlemont
Preceded by The Viscount Peel	First Commissioner of Works; 1928–1929	Succeeded by George Lansbury
Preceded by George Lansbury	First Commissioner of Works; 1931	Succeeded by Hon. William Ormsby-Gore
Preceded by The Lord Amulree	Secretary of State for Air; 1931–1935	Succeeded by The Viscount Swinton
Preceded by The Viscount Hailsham	Leader of the House of Lords; 1935	Succeeded by The Viscount Halifax
Preceded by Anthony Eden	Lord Privy Seal; 1935	Succeeded by The Viscount Halifax
Party political offices
Preceded by The Viscount Hailsham	Leader of the Conservative Party in the House of Lords; 1935	Succeeded by The Viscount Halifax
Honorary titles
Preceded by The Marquess of Londonderry	Lord Lieutenant of Down; 1915–1949	Succeeded by The Earl of Kilmorey
Preceded by The Earl of Durham	Lord Lieutenant of Durham; 1928–1949	Succeeded by Jack Lawson
Academic offices
Preceded by The Earl of Shaftesbury	Chancellor of Queen's University Belfast; 1923–1949	Succeeded by The Viscount Alanbrooke
Preceded by The Duke of Northumberland	Chancellor of the University of Durham; 1931–1949	Succeeded by George Macaulay Trevelyan
Peerage of Ireland
Preceded by Charles Vane-Tempest-Stewart	Marquess of Londonderry; 1915–1949	Succeeded by Robin Vane-Tempest-Stewart
