= Mount Stewart =

Historic residence in Northern Ireland

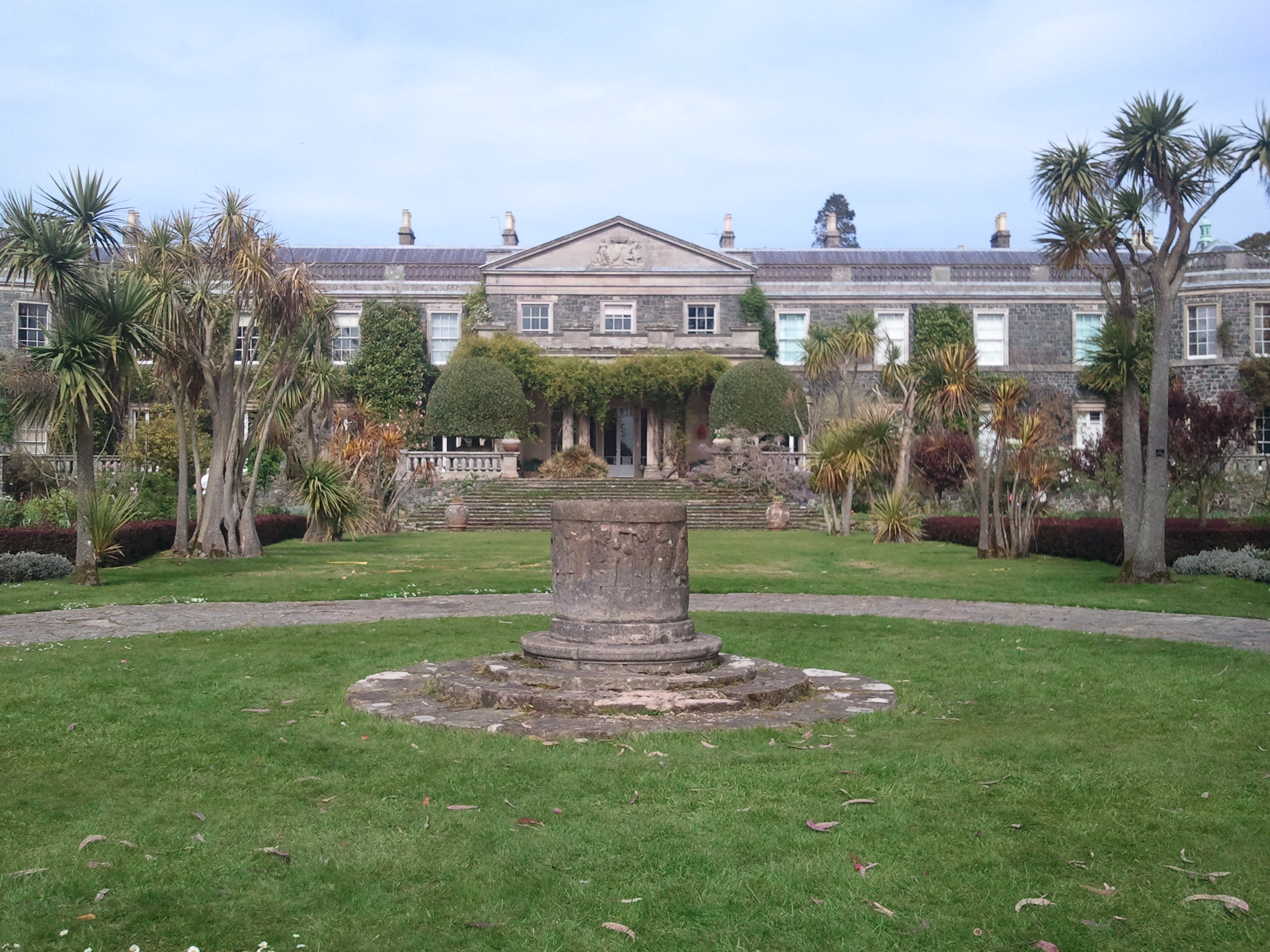
- Mount Stewart, April 2011

- Location of Mount Stewart in Northern Ireland
- 54.555°N 5.608°W

History
- Built: 1820–1839
- Built for: Marquess of Londonderry

Site notes
- Architect(s): George Dance, William Vitruvius Morrison
- Owner: National Trust

Listed Building – Grade A
- Designated: 20 December 1976
- Reference no.: HB24/04/052 A

Register of Parks, Gardens and Demesnes of Special Historic Interest

Mount Stewart is a 19th-century house and garden in County Down, Northern Ireland, owned by the National Trust. Situated on the east shore of Strangford Lough, a few miles outside the town of Newtownards and near Greyabbey, it was the Irish seat of the Stewart family, Marquesses of Londonderry. Prominently associated in particular with the 2nd Marquess of Londonderry (better known as Viscount Castlereagh), Britain's Foreign Secretary at the Congress of Vienna, and with the 7th Marquess of Londonderry, the former Air Minister who at Mount Stewart attempted private diplomacy with Hitler's Germany, the house and its contents reflect the history of the family's leading role in social and political life in Britain and Ireland.

== History ==
=== County seat of the Stewarts, Lords Londonderry and Castlereagh ===
The original property, Mount Pleasant, was purchased with neighbouring estates in 1744 by Alexander Stewart (1699–1781). Exceptionally for an aspiring member of the landed Ascendancy, the Stewarts did not conform to the established (Anglican) church. They were Presbyterians, farmers and linen merchants whose fortunes had been transformed by Alexander's marriage to the sister and heiress of Robert Cowan, the East India Company governor of Bombay.

As fellow Presbyterians, the Stewarts appeared to the county's enfranchised forty-shilling freeholders as "friends of reform", and on that basis Mount Stewart rivalled Hillsborough Castle, seat of the Earls (later Marquesses) of Downshire, for control of the county's two parliamentary seats. In the increasingly troubled 1790s, Mount Stewart quietly converted to Anglicanism and stilled the contest, agreeing with Hillsborough that each should return a member to the parliament in Dublin unopposed.

Titles and office followed. In 1795 Alexander's son, Robert Stewart (1739–1821) was elevated to Earl of Londonderry (Marquess in 1816), and in 1797 his son Robert Stewart, Viscount Castlereagh (1769–1822), was appointed Chief Secretary for Ireland by the Lord Lieutenant, Londonderry's brother-in-law, John Pratt, Earl Camden.

After helping, in the wake of the 1798 rebellion, to push the Act of Union through the Irish Parliament, bringing Ireland under the Crown at Westminster, Castlereagh went on to serve the new United Kingdom as Secretary of State for War and the Colonies and Foreign Secretary, building the coalitions that defeated Napoleon.

In 1787, sharing with her brother William Drennan (a disappointed supporter of the Stewarts' electoral ambitions, later to be targeted by Castlereagh as a United Irishman), her impressions, Martha McTier does Mount Stewart "much expense, no taste, everything unfinished and dirty, grand plans for the future, nothing pleasant nor even comfortable at present".

Commensurate with the family's rising fortunes, Castlereagh moved to realise some of these plans. In 1803, he choose the architect George Dance the Younger to design a neoclassical Regency replacement of the west wing with new receptions rooms. A number of the present furnishings reflect Castlereagh's career, including a portrait of the French emperor, and chairs elaborately embroidered for the delegates who redrew the map of Europe at Vienna.

=== In the Year of Liberty, 1798 ===
During the three-day "Year of Liberty" in Ards and north Down, 10 to 13 June 1798, Mount Stewart was briefly occupied by the United Irish insurgents. In the wake of the courts-martial that followed, the wife of the local Presbyterian minister, James Porter, appeared at the house with her seven children to plead for his life. Together with her younger sister, Lady Elizabeth, then dying of tuberculosis, Frances Stewart, Marchioness of Londonderry, was tearfully persuaded. (She had often received Porter at Mount Stewart, and in correspondence with the United Irishwoman Jane Greg had referred to herself as a "republican countess".) But Lord Londonderry was to see to it that Porter, convicted on uncertain evidence of having consorted with the rebels, was hanged outside his church and home at Greyabbey.

Other offenders (David Bailie Warden who commanded the local rebels in the field, and the Reverend Thomas Ledlie Birch who urged them to "drive the bloodhounds of King George, the German king, beyond the seas"), were allowed American exile. Porter's offence may have been to have serially lampooned Londonderry in a popular satire of the landed interest, Billy Bluff. Porter caricatured the master of Mount Stewart as Lord Mountmumble, an inarticulate tyrant who has a dog shot for the temerity of barking.

=== Irish country seat of the Vane-Tempest-Stewarts ===
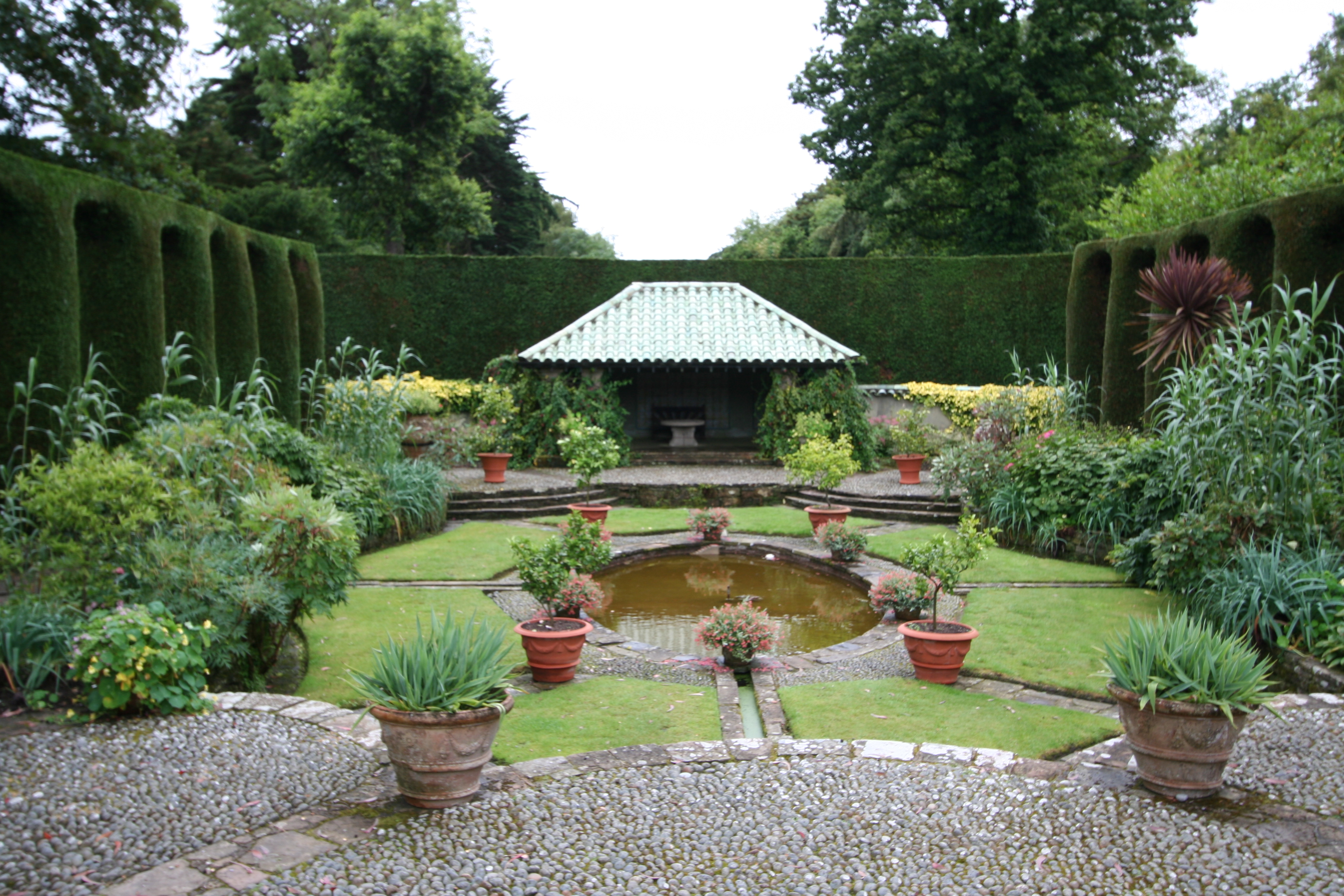
Spanish garden

Castlereagh inherited his father's title in 1821, but within the year took his own life. The next owner of the house was his half-brother, Charles Vane, 3rd Marquess of Londonderry (1778–1854) who had served as ambassador to Vienna and Berlin. He married Lady Frances Vane-Tempest, the greatest heiress of her time, in appreciation of which he styled himself Robert Vane and ordered a further enlargement of the house, replacing what remained of its 18th-century fabric.

Controversially in 1847, while spending £15,000 on the refurbishment, the Marquess of Londonderry gave just £30 to local soup kitchens for famine relief, and as the hunger persisted rejected rent reductions. Despite reports of general distress, he insisted that only most "supine and inert" among this tenantry could "be suffering in any serious degree under the failure of the potato". This was in contrast to his wife's management of her estate in Antrim. Even as she embarked upon of the construction a castellated summer residence (Garron Tower), the Marchioness not only reduced the rents of her tenants, but in dire cases of potato blight, waived them altogether.

The Famine-era remodelling created the present exterior of Mount Stewart. The original Georgian building and the small portico on the west wing were demolished and the house was increased to eleven bays. On the entrance front, a huge portico was added in the centre, and a smaller 'half portico' was added to the other side.

The marriage also brought in much of the Vane-Tempest property, including land and coal mines in County Durham. Wynyard Park was redesigned in the Neoclassical style. The couple bought Seaham Hall, also in County Durham, and then later bought Holdernesse House on London's Park Lane. This was later renamed Londonderry House.

In 1854, Emperor Napoleon III was among the subscribers who helped raise a memorial tower to the 3rd Marquess north of Mount Stewart at Scrabo.

Frederick Stewart, 4th Marquess of Londonderry, married the widow of Richard Wingfield, 6th Viscount Powerscourt, and lived at her home, Powerscourt, near Dublin. George Vane-Tempest, 5th Marquess of Londonderry, lived at his wife's ancestral property, Plas Machynlleth, in Wales. These long periods of neglect threatened an irreversible deterioration of the Irish property.

=== Ulster unionist manse ===
Charles Vane-Tempest-Stewart, 6th Marquess of Londonderry (1852–1915), returned to Ireland from Wynyard Park, first as Lord Lieutenant in Dublin, and then to Mount Stewart from which both he and the Marchioness, Lady Theresa Vane-Tempest-Stewart, served as the titular leaders of opposition to Irish Home Rule. They presided, respectively, over the Ulster Unionist Council and the Ulster Unionist Women's Council (UUWC).

Lady Londonderry (Theresa Chetwynd-Talbot) was valued for her family and political connections in England. In 1903, at Mount Stewart, she had hosted Edward VII and Queen Alexandra. She also proved an effective organiser, helping build the UUWC into a mass organisation, and in the preparation of an armed resistance to a Dublin parliament, the Ulster Volunteers to whom she offered Mount Stewart as a potential infirmary and triage site.

At the height of the Home Rule Crisis, the German Emperor had occasion to refer to the Marchioness's gardens. Meeting the unionist leader Sir Edward Carson at a luncheon at Bad Homburg in August 1913, Wilhelm II remarked that having seen a photograph of the gardens, he believed that they must be very beautiful. When Carson (who once proposed that he was "born to lounge and enjoy" himself at Mount Stewart) affirmed that indeed they were, the Kaiser warmed to his theme. The management of gardens is very like that of states. But Britain had done little to cultivate the unity of its empire, so that when he had asked his grandmother, Queen Victoria, leave to visit Ireland she had refused him. "Perhaps she thought I would steal the little place." When after the general laughter he persisted with questions on Ulster, Carson adroitly changed the subject. Through the gardens of Mount Stewart the Kaiser had been probing intelligence that in the event of a European war conflict, Ireland might stay Britain's hand.

=== Host to Hitler's ambassador ===
In 1921, Charles Vane-Tempest-Stewart, 7th Marquess of Londonderry (1878–1949), accepted office as Minister of Education in the unexpected fruit of unionist agitation, the new home-rule Parliament of Northern Ireland. In 1935, his larger ambitions in London were dashed when he was forced to resign as Air Minister. Despite having preserved the core of the Royal Air Force when it was under attack from the Treasury, critics believed he was one of an aristocratic circle of "appeasers". At Mount Stewart it was a suspicion Londonderry appeared to confirm when, following on a visit to Hitler in Berlin, in May 1936 he entertained the German Ambassador to London, Joachim von Ribbentrop. Ribbentrop is reported to have landed in Newtownards with a "noisy gang of SS men" and the four-day visit became a national newspaper story.

The house retains a memento of this private diplomacy: an Allach porcelain figurine of an SS Fahnenträger (SS flag bearer). A gift from Reichsmarschall Hermann Göring, after the outbreak of war it was neither destroyed nor removed. With talk of his internment, Londonderry retreated to Mount Stewart where, following a series of debilitating strokes, he died in 1949. Flanked by statues of four Irish saints, he is buried in the estate's family graveyard.

The ancestral home of the 7th Marchioness of Londonderry, Edith Halen Chaplin, was Dunrobin Castle in Scotland and it was that house's gardens which inspired her reworking of those at Mount Stewart with themed plantings (the Italian, Spanish, and Mairi gardens) and the Dodo Terrace with its whimsical statuary (Ribbentrop described the effect as "paradise"). Rather than enter her gardens through a house door she would dive in and out of a sash window, followed by her dogs – of which there were 14 at one time, ranging from deerhound to pekinese. Lady Edith also redesigned and redecorated much of the interior, for example, the huge drawing room, the Castlereagh Room, the smoking room (whose mantelpiece displayed the Fahnenträger) and many of the guest bedrooms. She named the latter after European cities including Rome and Moscow.

=== Donation to the National Trust ===
The last châtelaine of the house (and the last surviving child of the 7th Marquess), Lady Mairi Bury (née Vane-Tempest-Stewart, Viscountess Bury), gave the house, and most of its contents to the National Trust in 1977, together with a capital endowment partly funded by the sale in 1977, by Lady Mairi, of Giovanni Bellini's painting The Madonna and Child with a male Donor, a landscape beyond which had hung over the altar in the chapel at Mount Stewart (having formerly been at Londonderry House, London). Lady Mairi, born in the house, was the last Londonderry family member to live full time at Mount Stewart, and the last member of this Anglo-Irish family to live full time in Ireland. She died at Mount Stewart on 18 November 2009, at the age of 88, in the same four poster bed, hung with red silk damask, that she had been born in.

On Lady Bury's death, her daughter Lady Rose Lauritzen, wife of art historian Peter Lauritzen, became the live-in family member.

== National Trust property ==
The National Trust has operated the 50-acre property it acquired in 1977 under the name "Mount Stewart House, Garden & Temple of the Winds". In 1999, the gardens were added to the United Kingdom "Tentative List" of sites for potential nomination as a UNESCO World Heritage Site.

In 2015, the National Trust completed an extensive restoration of the house and its contents and purchased an additional 900 acres (360 hectares) of land that had previously been part of the wider estate. At the end of January 2025, the enlarged property lost more than 10,000 trees to the hurricane-force winds of Storm Eowyn. The losses included "mature trees with veteran qualities and significant histories".

=== House ===
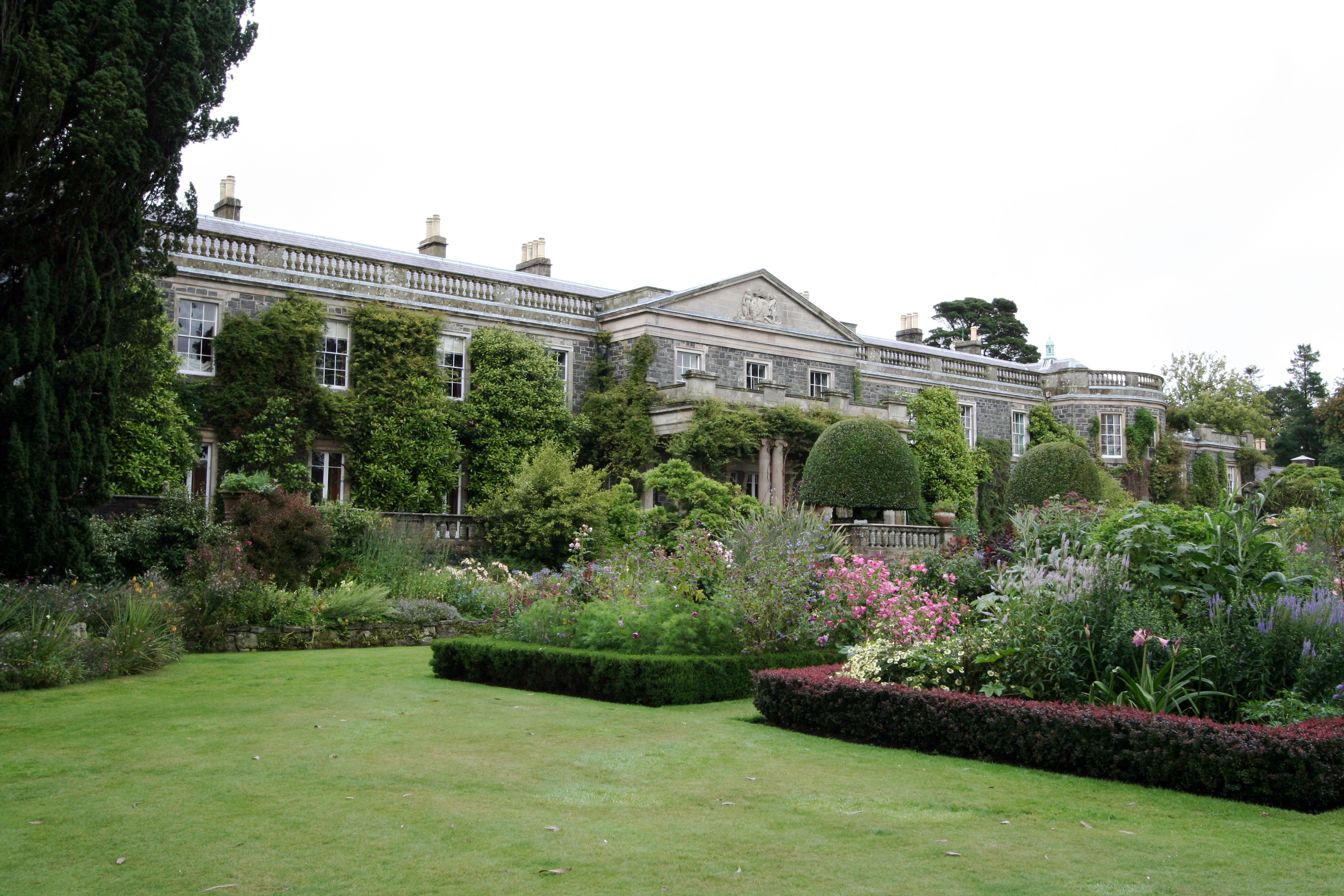
Characteristically luxuriant planting contained within formally clipped edging

The present house is largely a legacy of the 3rd Marquess of Londonderry, who, beginning in the 1830s, refurbished and extended the original 18th-century structure along neo-classical lines. The main entrance was shifted to the centre of the new north façade, with a large Ionic columned porte-cochère. Two domes were introduced, one placed in the centre of the roof to light the new full height main hall, and another to light a full-height room to the immediate south of this.

Portions of what are now Lady Londonderry's sitting room, the music room, the Castlereagh room and the staircase were left untouched, but a new suite of rooms was added. Of these the principal is the drawing room, which looks out onto the main gardens and, before the building along the shore of the A20, would have had a view of Strangford Lough. The house's private chapel, with stained glass windows and Italian murals, was added after the death of 3rd Marquess in 1854, and in his memory.

The National Trust refurbishment, completed in 2015, sought to restore the interiors to how they appeared in the 1950s when the house belonged to Lady Edith, the seventh Marchioness. An exception is the Ionic-columned octagonal main hall, where the chequered stone floor laid by the 3rd Marquess has been uncovered and restored.

=== Gardens ===
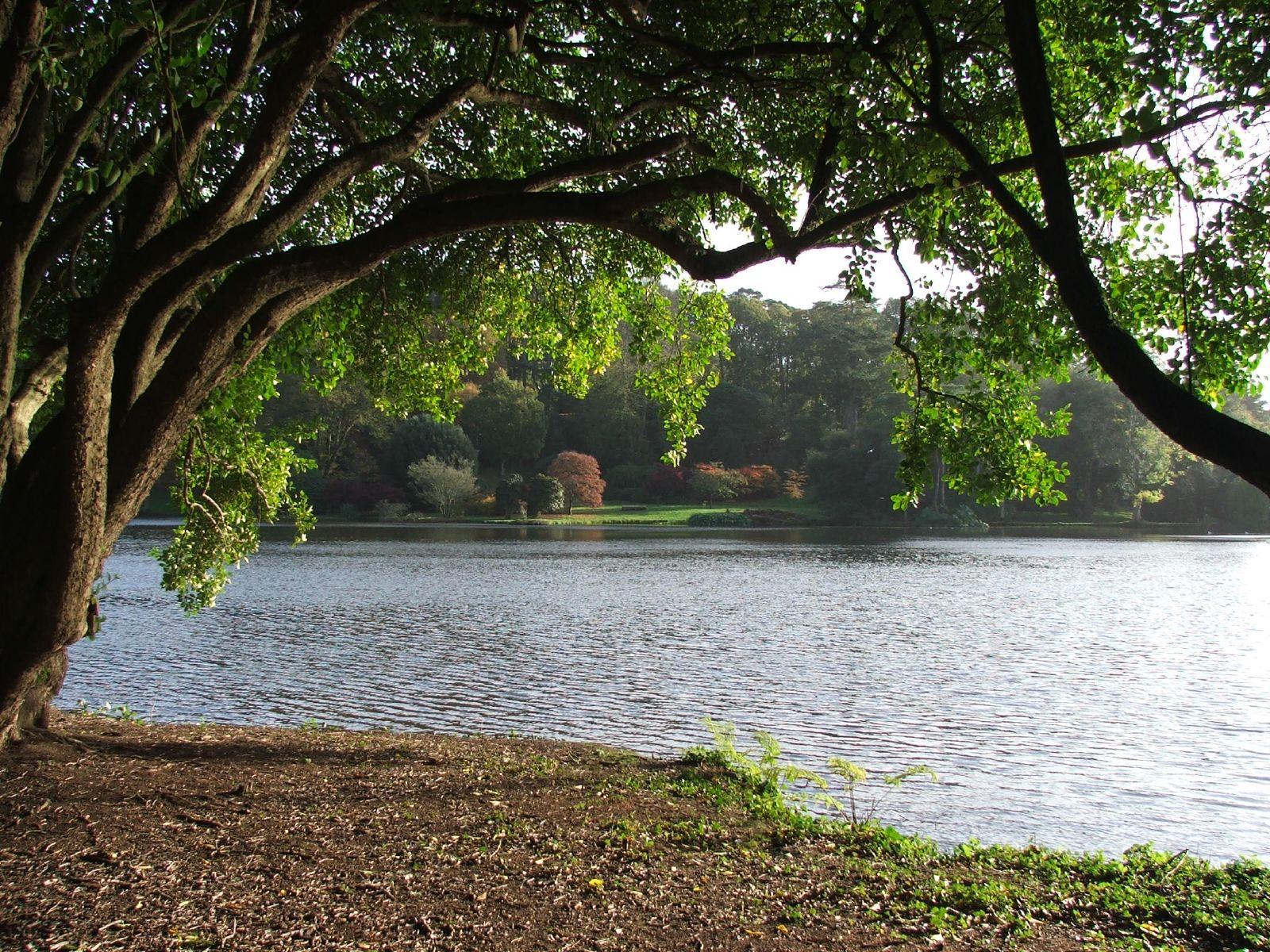
The lake at Mount Stewart

After further alterations to house's interior, the 7th Marchioness, redesigned the gardens a lavish style that took advantage of the sub-tropical local climate. As Lady Edith discovered, Mount Stewart under the general influence of the North Atlantic Drift, on the Ards Peninsula Mount Stewart enjoys mild and humid island conditions, allowing tropical plants to thrive.

Prior to her husband's succession to the Marquessate in 1915, the gardens had been plain lawns with large decorative pots. She added the Shamrock Garden, the Sunken Garden, increased the size of the lake, added a Spanish Garden with a small hut, the Italian Garden, the Dodo Terrace with its 'menagerie' of cement animals, the Fountain Pool and laid out walks in the Lily Wood and rest of the estate. It was she who first realised the benefits of the sub-tropical local climate. The area is frost-free and, as Lady Edith discovered, Mount Stewart enjoys island conditions, the atmosphere is humid and, in hot weather, there are heavy dews at night. Tender tropical plants thrive here and many greenhouse varieties have been planted outside with impressive results. In 1957, she gave the gardens to the National Trust. Red squirrels can at times be seen in the garden.

=== Temple of the Winds ===
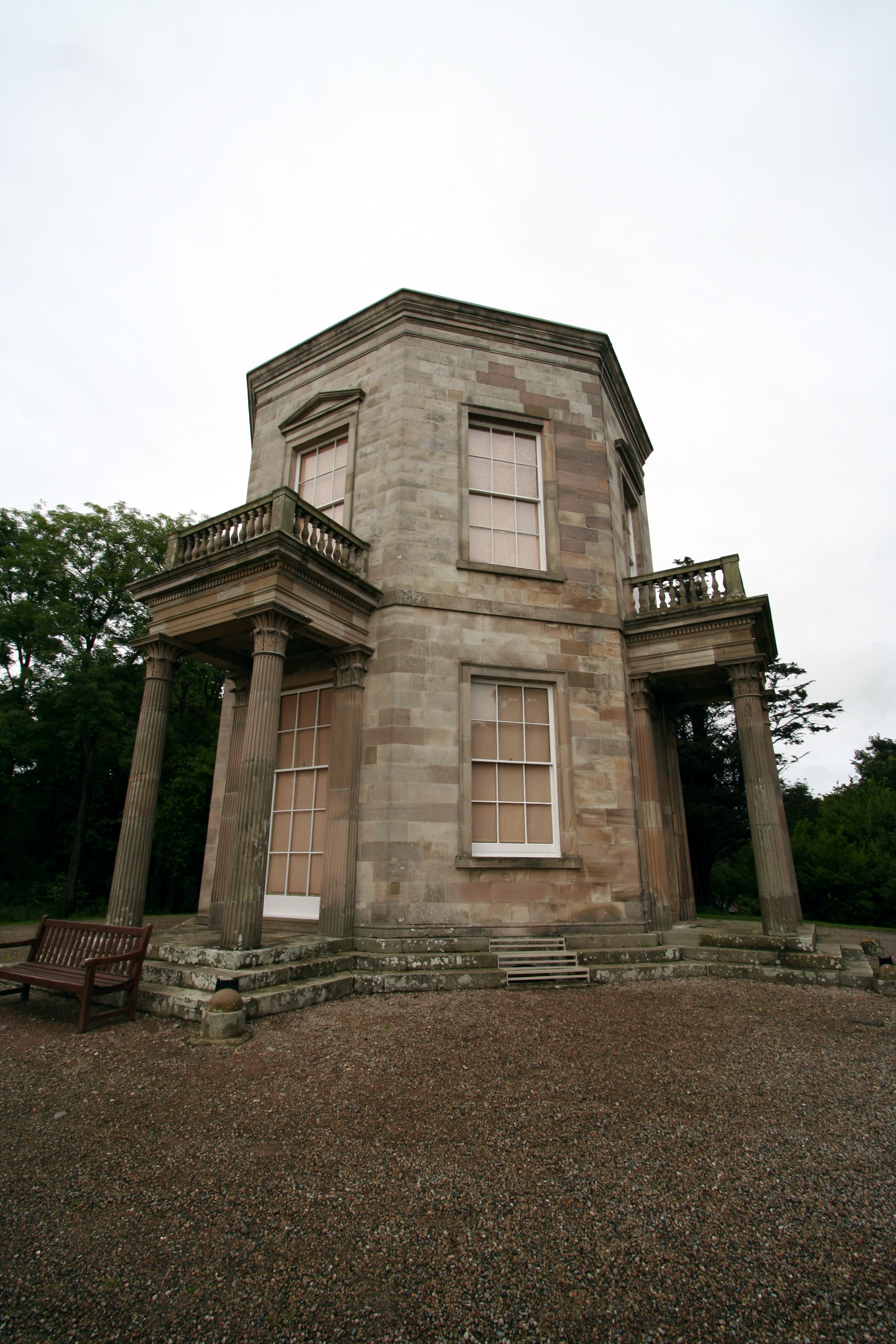
The Temple of the Winds

The Temple of the Winds, overlooking Strangford Lough, is an octagonal building designed by architect James 'Athenian' Stuart in 1782–83. It was inspired by his study of the Tower of the Winds (the astronomical Horologium of Andronikos Kyrrhestes) in the Roman Agora in Athens which has a frieze depicting the eight wind deities (anemoi) of Greek mythology.

Many country houses in the UK had adaptations of the 'temples' their owners had seen on their tours of the Mediterranean. The temple is similar to structures at Shugborough and West Wycombe Park, both National Trust properties.

=== Use as filming location ===
The house was used in 2014 as a location for the third series of the BBC children's TV series The Sparticle Mystery. The property was rated in 2024 as among the 10 most popular filming locations in Northern Ireland.

== See also ==
- Dunduff Castle, South Ayrshire, property of the ancestors of the Stewarts of Mount Stewart

Other residences of the Marquesses of Londonderry:

- Londonderry House in London
- Plas Machynlleth in Wales
- Seaham Hall in County Durham
- Wynyard Park in County Durham
- Loring Hall in Kent

== Bibliography ==
- Murdoch, Tessa (ed.) (2022). Great Irish Households: Inventories from the Long Eighteenth Century. Cambridge: John Adamson, pp. 325–48 ISBN 978-1-898565-17-8 OCLC 1233305993
- Tinniswood, Adrian (2018). Mount Stewart, County Down: A Souvenir Guide. Swindon: National Trust ISBN 978-1-84359-306-5 OCLC 1048756779
