= Lady Mairi Bury =

Northern Irish politician, gardener, aviator and philatelist (1921–2009)

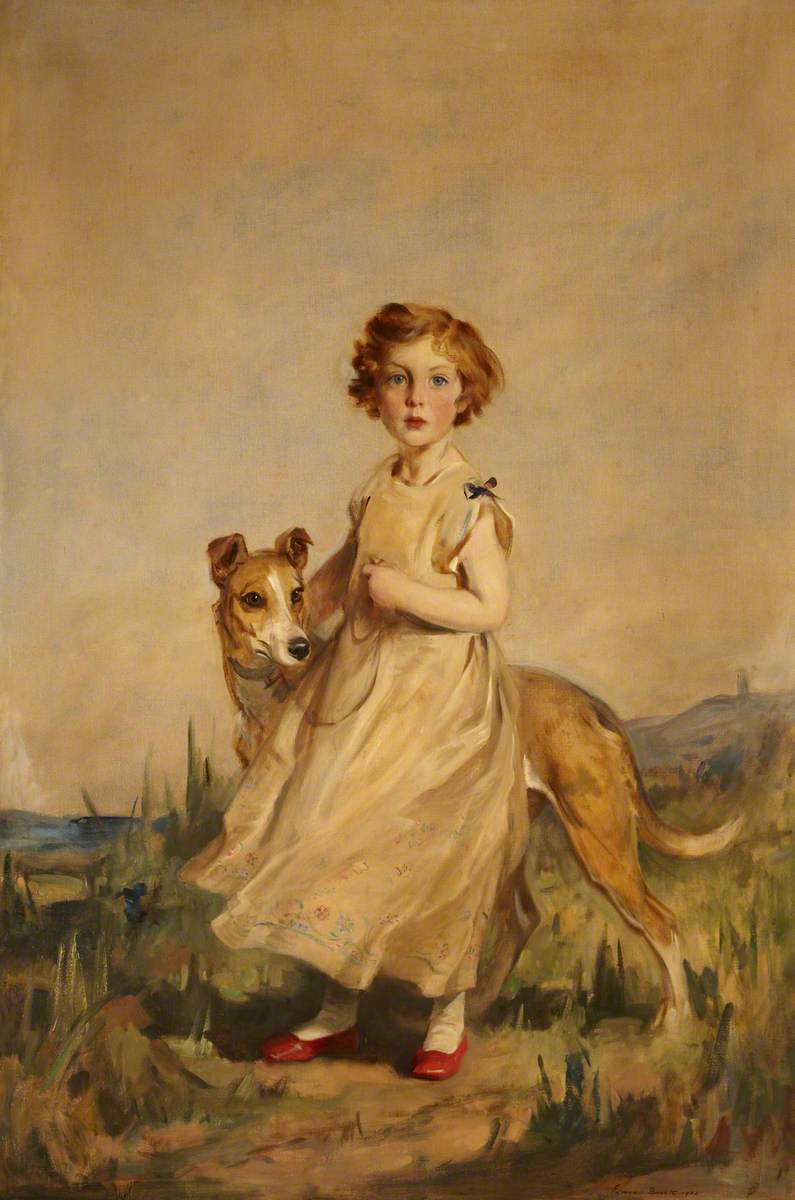
- Portrait of Lady Mairi Bury, aged three, by Edmond Brock, 1924
- Born: Lady Mary Elizabeth Vane-Tempest-Stewart; 25 March 1921; Mount Stewart, County Down, United Kingdom
- Died: 16 November 2009 (aged 88); Mount Stewart, County Down, Northern Ireland
- Spouse(s): Derek Keppel, Viscount Bury (m. 1940; div. 1958)
- Children: 2
- Parents: Charles Vane-Tempest-Stewart, 7th Marquess of Londonderry (father); The Hon. Edith Chaplin (mother)

Lady Mary Elizabeth "Mairi" Bury (née Vane-Tempest-Stewart; 25 March 1921 – 16 November 2009), known between 1942 and 1958 as Viscountess Bury, was a Northern Irish politician, gardener, aviator, and philatelist.

== Early life and family ==
Lady Mairi Bury was born Lady Mary Elizabeth Vane-Tempest-Stewart at Mount Stewart, County Down on 25 March 1921. She was the youngest of four daughters and one son of Charles Vane-Tempest-Stewart, 7th Marquess of Londonderry and Edith Helen Vane-Tempest Stewart. Bury was much younger than her siblings; her eldest sister was 21 at the time of Bury's birth. She was privately educated at her home of Mount Stewart. Her father was the first minister for education and leader of the Stormont senate from May 1921. He had an interest in aviation, donating fifty acres for the establishment of an aerodrome and flying school at Newtownards in 1933, hoping it would become Northern Ireland's main public airport. The Stewarts used the aerodrome to travel between Mount Stewart and London. One of the first flights to land there was in 1934 when Bury brought monkeys for a private zoo at Mount Stewart. She learned how to drive there, and at aged 12 she piloted a plane solo in February 1934. The story of her flight was covered in newspapers in the United States and the United Kingdom, with her instructor reportedly saying she was "as cool as ice".

In 1936, Joachim von Ribbentrop, the German ambassador to the UK, arrived at the airfield at Lord Londonderry's invitation as he wished to maintain good relations with the German government of Adolf Hitler. Londonderry took his wife and Bury with him to Germany, with Bury remembering meeting both Hitler and Heinrich Himmler. In recalling the meeting, she stated that neither impressed her, describing Hitler as an undistinguished fellow and Himmler as looking like a floorwalker in Harrods shop. In later life, Bury defended her father's actions by claiming he was attempting to avoid another world war. After the outbreak of World War II, Bury joined the motor transport section of the Women's Legion, which her mother founded during World War I in 1915, driving pickups in the London docks. She married the Hon. Derek William Charles Keppel on 10 December 1940. He was the grandson of Arnold Keppel, 8th Earl of Albemarle, who died in 1942, at which point his father Walter Keppel became the 9th Earl of Albemarle and Derek Keppel became known by the courtesy title Viscount Bury, leading to his wife's use of the name "Bury". He shared her interest in aviation, serving as a captain in the 13th/18th Royal Hussars, and was seconded to the Royal Air Force from 1938 to 1942. The couple had two daughters before their divorce in 1958, Elizabeth Mairi and Rose Deirdre Margaret. Derek, Viscount Bury, predeceased his father and thus never became Earl of Albemarle.

== Mount Stewart ==
Bury lived most of her life at Mount Stewart, both before and after her divorce. Her father had a strained relationship with Bury's brother, his only son, which led to Bury and her mother inheriting the Mount Stewart estate after the 7th Marquess of Londonderry's death in 1949. Bury was a keen gardener, maintaining the gardens created by her mother. The gardens were given to the National Trust in 1957 to ensure their survival. Bury stayed on the estate, living in an apartment after she gave the house and most of the contents in 1976 to the trust. She generally avoided contact with the thousands of visitors who came to the estate. Bury served as a Justice of the Peace in County Down, but was a stanch opponent of the Good Friday Agreement. She broke with family tradition and left the Ulster Unionist Party to join the Democratic Unionist Party, as she felt it was the only way that the interests of Northern Ireland could be guaranteed.

Bury was the life president of Ards Football Club and served as commodore of Newtownards Sailing Club. She was also a racehorse owner, owning the first thoroughbred stud in Northern Ireland. With her horse Fighting Charlie, she won the Gold Cup at Ascot twice, and with Northern Gleam the Irish Thousand Guineas once. At the Royal Ulster Agricultural Society's show at Balmoral, Belfast, Bury regularly exhibited yearlings and colts.

== Philately ==
From the age of eight, Bury was a lifelong philatelist. She searched for rarities, collecting letters and envelopes connected to scandals or notorious events of the 19th century. She always kept her collection to hand, never in a bank vault or safe, so that she could work on it at any time. For her knowledge, she was elected a fellow of the Royal Philatelic Society London. Bury owned a number of the rarest stamps in the world. When Sotheby's put her collection up for sale after her death, they described it as the finest collection to be sold in more than 25 years, and possibly the finest ever to have been amassed by a woman. Her collection ran to tens of thousands of stamps, with examples of every Penny Black produced including an unissued Penny Black from April 1840, and one from the first day postage stamps were officially used, 6 May 1840. In total her collection sold for £3,045,924 in 2,185 lots.

== Death and legacy ==
Bury died on 16 November 2009 at Mount Stewart in the bed she was born in. She is buried in the family burial ground in the garden at Mount Stewart, Tír na nÓg. A fountain in the gardens in Mount Stewart was restored in 2012. Margaret Wrightson was commissioned in 1925 to create the fountain and it was modeled after Bury as a toddler.
