= Hugh Falkus =

- Born: 15 May 1917; Cheam, Surrey, England
- Died: 30 March 1996 (aged 78); Birkby, Ravenglass, Eskdale, Cumbria, England
- Other names: Hugh Edward Lance Falkus
- Known for: Writer, film maker, television presenter, pilot and angler

Hugh Falkus (15 May 1917 – 30 March 1996) was a British writer, filmmaker and presenter, World War II pilot and angler. In an extremely varied career, he is perhaps best known for his seminal books on angling, particularly salmon and sea trout fishing; however, he was also a noted filmmaker and broadcaster for the BBC.

== Biography ==
Hugh Edward Lance Falkus was born to James Falkus, a Surrey bank manager, and his wife Alice Maud. James retired early to a boat, first on the Essex marshes and then in Devon, whereupon Hugh was sent to the Culford School, in Suffolk. According to his entry in the Oxford Dictionary of National Biography, Hugh caught his first fish when he was four, learned to shoot when he was six, and was an expert helmsman by the age of fifteen. By eighteen he had learned to fly, and at twenty he became a pilot in the RAF.

On 11 July 1939 he married Doris Marjorie Walter, and they had two sets of twins (three sons and a daughter). The youngest son, Anthony, born in 1952, died in infancy. The older twins, Christopher and Malcolm, born in 1940, had successful careers, with Christopher becoming a prominent publisher while Malcolm's career has been in economic history. Falkus' only daughter, Rowena Mary, is a Benedictine nun.

In June 1940 Falkus' Spitfire was shot down over France and he spent the rest of the war in German prison camps, including Stalag Luft III the Great Escape camp. After the war he left Doris and in 1950 he married Diana Vaughan, the young editor of Argosy magazine, but on 12 May 1951 Diana was drowned, along with Charles Osborne, Bill Brendon and Sam Lee, in a boating accident off the coast of Achill Island in County Mayo, Ireland, while they were making a film about the local shark hunting industry. Near the Daisy Rocks, a huge wave estimated to be 27 feet high capsized and sank the lifeboat being used for the filming. Falkus, a powerful swimmer, took command and ensured other members of the party including his wife were equipped with flotation devices; roping them together into a raft, and then set out for help. He collapsed unconscious having narrowly survived after swimming over a mile to the shore, before being able to tell his rescuers the location of the accident and its survivors. As efforts were made to revive him, rescue parties went to the wrong location, Achill Head, based on guesswork. Falkus immediately upon recovering consciousness told the correct location but by then it was too late and the others had died from cold. His wife's remains and one other person's were recovered.

In 1952 Falkus married Lady Margaret Vane-Tempest-Stewart, second daughter of the 7th Marquess of Londonderry, but the marriage was short-lived. By 1955 Falkus had settled in Eskdale, Cumberland, which he had come to know and love through his friendship with Bill Fowler, a bomber pilot from Long Yocking, Eskdale, who he had met in a prisoner of war camp. In 1958 Falkus married Kathleen Armstrong, daughter of a local farming family. He lived with her at Cragg Cottage, Eskdale, for most of the rest of his life, writing about fishing and natural history and making television films on related subjects. He wrote, produced and presented a series of The World About Us films for the BBC, and with the Nobel Prize-winning zoologist Professor Niko Tinbergen he made a film about gull behaviour called Signals for Survival which won the Italia prize in 1969, and first prize for the BBC at the 1969 Montreux Film Festival. He was reportedly and according to his biographer, Chris Newton, a sexual predator, gaining the punning nickname "Huge Phallus" at the BBC. He was still having affairs in his late sixties, upsetting his friends by deserting Kathleen, his wife of 25 years for a woman named Romille.

Falkus' masterwork Sea Trout Fishing, A Practical Guide (HF & G Witherby 1962, enlarged edition 1975) became a best-seller and has never been out of print; it "established his reputation as the father of modern sea-trout fishing" according to his biographer, Chris Newton. It was followed in 1984 by Salmon Fishing, a Practical Guide, also a best-seller which remains in print.

Falkus was a controversial and outspoken figure, insisting on being right and bullying people.

He was awarded the Royal Geographical Society's Cherry Kearton Medal and Award in 1982.

Hugh Falkus died of cancer and bronchopneumonia at his home at Cragg Cottage on 30 March 1996. His son Christopher had predeceased him, dying in 1995 of heart disease.

== Works ==
Falkus's works include:

=== Films ===
- The Signreaders, 1964
- Signals for Survival, 1968, with Niko Tinbergen
- The Riddle of the Rook, 1973
- Tender Trap, 1974
- Self-Portrait of a Happy Man, 1976
- Salmo the Leaper, 1977
- Highland Story, 1979

=== Books ===
- Sea Trout Fishing, 1962
- The Stolen Years: Memories of a Country Boyhood, 1965
- Signals for Survival, 1994 (with Niko Tinbergen)
- Freshwater Fishing, 1975 (with Fred Buller)
- Nature Detective, 1978
- Salmon Fishing, 1984
- Falkus & Buller's Freshwater Fishing, 1992
- Speycasting: A New Technique, 1994
- The Salmon and Sea Trout Fisher's Handbook, 1994 (with Malcolm Greenhalgh)
- Some of It Was Fun, 2003
