= Stanley Kubrick's unrealized projects =

During his long career, American film director Stanley Kubrick had worked on a number of projects which never progressed beyond the pre-production stage under his direction. Some of these projects fell into development hell or are officially cancelled.

== The Burning Secret and Natural Child ==
In 1956, after the Metro-Goldwyn-Mayer (M.G.M.) studio turned down a request from Kubrick and his producer partner James B. Harris to film Paths of Glory (1957), MGM then invited Kubrick to review the studio's other properties. Harris and Kubrick discovered the Stefan Zweig novel The Burning Secret (1913), in which a young baron attempts to seduce a young Jewish woman by first befriending her twelve-year-old son, who eventually realizes the actual motives of the baron. Kubrick was enthusiastic about the novel and hired novelist Calder Willingham to write a screenplay; however, Hays Code restrictions hindered the realization of the project.

The script, once thought to be lost, was found in 2018 and is nearly complete, enough that it could be developed by filmmakers. Kubrick had previously expressed interest in adapting the Willingham novel Natural Child (1952), but he was stymied by the Production Code on that occasion, as well.

== Napoleon ==
After the success of 2001, Kubrick planned a large-scale biographical film about Napoleon Bonaparte. He "tried to see every film that was ever made on the subject", including Abel Gance's Napoléon (1927) and the Soviet film series War and Peace, neither of which he liked.

Kubrick also conducted research, read books about the French emperor, and wrote a preliminary screenplay that has since become available both on the Internet and as part of a published comprehensive collection of his research and pre-production work.

With the help of assistants, Kubrick meticulously created a card catalog of the places and deeds of Napoleon's inner circle during its operative years. He scouted locations, planning to film large portions of the film on location in France, in addition to the use of United Kingdom studios. The director was also going to film the battle scenes in Romania and had enlisted the support of the Romanian People's Army; senior army officers had committed 40,000 soldiers and 10,000 cavalrymen to Kubrick's film for the paper costume battle scenes.

In a conversation with the British Film Institute, Kubrick's brother-in-law Jan Harlan stated that the film was set to enter production with David Hemmings as the title figure Napoleon (later, that role was assigned to Jack Nicholson), with Audrey Hepburn as Kubrick's preference for the character Josephine. In notes that Kubrick wrote to his financial backers, preserved in the book The Kubrick Archives, Kubrick expressed uncertainty in regard to the progress of the Napoleon film and the final product; however, he also stated that he expected to create "the best movie ever made".

Napoleon was eventually canceled due to the prohibitive cost of location filming, the Western release of the 1968 Sergei Bondarchuk epic film version of the Leo Tolstoy novel War and Peace, as well as the commercial failure of Bondarchuk's Napoleon-themed film Waterloo (1970). A significant portion of Kubrick's historical research would influence Barry Lyndon (1975), the storyline of which ends in 1789, about fifteen years before the commencement of the Napoleonic Wars.

In March 2013, Steven Spielberg announced his intention to create, along with Kubrick's family, a television miniseries based on Kubrick's screenplay.

In May 2016, HBO announced that it would produce a miniseries based on Kubrick's screenplay with Cary Joji Fukunaga as director.

In August 2018, French opera singer and actor David Serero adapted the screenplay for the stage, in New York, in which he stars as Napoleon. The play opened on August 23, 2018.

In February 2023, Spielberg reaffirmed that the miniseries at HBO was still in development and was being worked into a "large production" of a seven-part limited series.

That same year, a similar film with the same name would be later be released in 2023, directed by Ridley Scott and starring Joaquin Phoenix. While it covers the same material, Scott's film is not based on or influenced by Kubrick's screenplay.

== Aryan Papers ==
In 1976, Kubrick sought out a film idea that concerned the Holocaust and tried to persuade Isaac Bashevis Singer to contribute an original screenplay. Kubrick requested a "dramatic structure that compressed the complex and vast information into the story of an individual who represented the essence of this man-made hell." However, Singer declined the offer, explaining to Kubrick, "I don't know the first thing about the Holocaust."

In the early 1990s, Kubrick nearly entered the production stage of a film adaptation of Louis Begley's Wartime Lies, the story of a boy and his aunt as they are in hiding from the Nazi regime during the Holocaust—the first-draft screenplay, entitled Aryan Papers, was penned by Kubrick himself. Full Metal Jacket co-screenwriter Michael Herr reports that Kubrick had considered casting Julia Roberts or Uma Thurman as the aunt; eventually, Johanna ter Steege was cast as the aunt and Joseph Mazzello (who had also been considered for the leading role in Artificial Intelligence) as the young boy. Kubrick traveled to the Czech city of Brno, as it was envisaged as a possible filming location for the scenes of Warsaw during wartime, and cinematographer Elemér Ragályi was selected by Kubrick to be the director of photography.

Kubrick's work on Aryan Papers eventually ceased in 1995, as the director was influenced by the 1993 release of Spielberg's Holocaust-themed film Schindler's List. According to Kubrick's wife Christiane, an additional factor in Kubrick's decision to abandon the project was the increasingly depressing nature of its subject as experienced by the director. Kubrick eventually concluded that making an accurate Holocaust film was beyond the capacity of cinema, and he returned his attention to the A.I. Artificial Intelligence film project.

In 2005, William Monahan was hired to adapt Wartime Lies for Warner Independent Pictures in co-operation with John Wells Productions.

In 2009, Kubrick's brother-in-law Jan Harlan announced his desire to produce the film and hire Ang Lee or Roman Polanski to serve as director.

In 2020, it was reported that Luca Guadagnino hoped to direct the film, and that he had examined Kubrick's papers on the project, held at the Stanley Kubrick Archive at University of the Arts London.

== Shadow on the Sun ==
In the early 1960s, Kubrick, a keen listener of BBC Radio, heard the radio serial drama Shadow on the Sun; written by Gavin Blakeney, Shadow on the Sun is a work of science fiction in which a virus is introduced to Earth through a meteorite landing. At a time when Kubrick was looking for a new project, the director became reacquainted with Shadow on the Sun. Kubrick purchased screen rights from Blakeney in 1988 for £1,500. Thereon, Kubrick read and annotated a script before moving onto A.I. Artificial Intelligence. The tone of the unrealized project, as described by Anthony Frewin in The Kubrick Archives, is a cross between The War of the Worlds and Mars Attacks!.

== Lunatic at Large ==
On November 1, 2006, Kubrick's son-in-law Philip Hobbs announced that he would be shepherding a film treatment of a film-noir thriller called Lunatic at Large. Kubrick had commissioned the project for treatment from noir pulp novelist Jim Thompson in the 1950s, but it had been lost until Hobbs uncovered a manuscript following Kubrick's death. In August 2011, it was confirmed that the project was in development for future release, with the involvement of actors Scarlett Johansson and Sam Rockwell, and U.K. screenwriter Stephen R. Clarke.

In 2020, it was reported that Terry Gilliam was developing the project, according to Gilliam, he was set to start production, but it was cancelled due to the Covid-19 lockdowns.

In February 2021, Variety announced that producers Bruce Hendricks and Galen Walker had optioned the rights to the project.

== Unreleased screenplays ==
A number of screenplays that were written by Kubrick, who was either hired on a commission basis or was writing for his own projects, remain unreleased. One such screenplay is The German Lieutenant (co-written with Richard Adams), in which a group of German soldiers embark upon a mission during the final days of World War II. During the time period when The German Lieutenant was planned as Kubrick's next production, the director explained his interest in making another war film:

... one of the attractions of a war or crime story is that it provides an almost unique opportunity to contrast an individual of our contemporary society with a solid framework of accepted value, which the audience becomes fully aware of, and which can be used as a counterpoint to a human, individual, emotional situation. Further, war acts as a kind of hothouse for forced, quick breeding of attitudes and feelings. Attitudes crystallize and come out into the open.

Other examples of unreleased Kubrick screenplays are I Stole 16 Million Dollars, a fictionalized account of early 20th century Baptist minister turned safecracker Herbert Emmerson Wilson (the film was to be produced by Kirk Douglas's company Bryna Productions, despite Douglas's belief that the script was poorly written, and Cary Grant was approached for the lead role); and a first draft of a script about the Mosby Rangers, a Confederate guerrilla force that was active during the American Civil War.

== Other projects ==
Marlon Brando contacted Kubrick asking him to direct a film adaptation of Charles Neider's Western novel The Authentic Death of Hendry Jones, featuring Pat Garrett and Billy the Kid. (Note: This is disputed by Carlo Fiore, who has claimed that Brando had not heard of Kubrick initially and that it was he who arranged a dinner meeting between Brando and Kubrick.) Brando was impressed, saying that "Stanley is unusually perceptive, and delicately attuned to people. He has an adroit intellect, and is a creative thinker—not a repeater, not a fact-gatherer. He digests what he learns and brings to a new project an original point of view and a reserved passion". The two worked on a script for six months, begun by a then unknown Sam Peckinpah. Many disputes broke out over the project, and in the end, Kubrick distanced himself from what would become One-Eyed Jacks (1961). (Note: According to biographer John Baxter, Kubrick was furious with Brando's casting of France Nuyen, and when Kubrick had confessed to still "not knowing what the picture was about", Brando snapped: "I'll tell you what it's about. It's about $300,000 that I've already paid Karl Malden".) Kubrick was then reported to have been fired and accepted a parting fee of $100,000, though in a 1960 interview he claimed that he quit because "It had just become obvious to me that Brando wanted to direct the movie". Kubrick's biographer LoBrutto states that for contractual reasons, Kubrick was not able to cite the real reason, but issued a statement saying that he had resigned "with deep regret because of my respect and admiration for one of the world's foremost artists".

Kubrick was offered the chance to direct both The Exorcist (1973) and Exorcist II: The Heretic (1977), but declined, despite once saying in 1966 to a friend that he had long desired to "make the world's scariest movie, involving a series of episodes that would play upon the nightmare fears of the audience". Before deciding to direct The Shining, Kubrick even considered making a film based on the 1974 novel The Shadow Knows, whose author Diane Johnson later became the co-writer for The Shining.

Kubrick was fascinated by the career of Nazi filmmaker Veit Harlan, his wife's uncle, and contemplated creating a film of the social circle that surrounded Joseph Goebbels. Although Kubrick worked on this project for several years, the director was unable to progress his idea beyond a rough story outline.

In 1972, Andrew Birkin (who had held a variety of roles in the production of 2001) offered Kubrick his screenplay based on Inside the Third Reich, the memoir of Nazi architect and Minister of Armaments Albert Speer. According to Birkin, Kubrick was impressed by the script, but turned it down on the grounds that it should not be filmed by a Jewish director. However, the 2020 documentary Speer Goes to Hollywood suggests Kubrick's involvement ended due to his insistence that the film acknowledge Speer's awareness of the Nazi extermination camps, of which Speer claimed ignorance.

Umberto Eco, in response to an offer from Kubrick regarding a film adaptation of Eco's 1988 novel Foucault's Pendulum, declined due to his dissatisfaction with the 1986 film adaptation of his earlier novel The Name of the Rose. Additionally, Eco sought the role of screenwriter, but Kubrick was unwilling to cooperate. Following Kubrick's death, Eco stated that he regretted his initial decision.

Prior to the commencement of work for 2001, Terry Southern suggested the production of a high-budget pornographic film called Blue Movie to Kubrick; Southern proposed the film as an attempt to reinvent the genre. Kubrick decided against Southern's suggestion in the belief that he did not have the appropriate temperament for pornographic cinema; also, Kubrick did not think that he could sufficiently reinvent the genre to truly elevate it. At the same time, Southern had begun writing a novel, also entitled Blue Movie (published in 1970), in which a highly regarded art film director named "Boris Adrian" attempts to create such a film—the book is dedicated to Kubrick.

Following J. R. R. Tolkien's sale of the film rights for The Lord of the Rings to United Artists in 1969, the rock band The Beatles considered a corresponding film project and approached Kubrick as a potential director; however, Kubrick turned down the offer, explaining to John Lennon that he thought the novel could not be adapted into a film due to its immensity. The director of the second film adaptation, Peter Jackson, further explained that a major hindrance to the project's progression was Tolkien's opposition to the involvement of the Beatles.

Beginning around 1976, Kubrick developed with John Milius an adaptation of Night Drop by S. L. A. Marshall, about the airborne invasion of Normandy. According to Milius, Kubrick said to him: "There are only two great books ever written on war. Night Drop by S. L. A. Marshall and The Iliad. We're going to do Night Drop." They worked on and talked about the project for many years, but it never came to fruition.

Kubrick also considered adapting Patrick Süskind's novel Perfume, which he had enjoyed; however, the idea was never acted upon. The novel was later adapted for the screen by Tom Tykwer, as Perfume: The Story of a Murderer.

Kubrick, searching for a project after Full Metal Jacket, considered adapting Robert Marshall's novel All the King's Men, a dramatic account of a British intelligence service operation during World War II.

In the late 1980s, due to the reading fatigue of his assistant Anthony Frewin, Kubrick would set up a company called Empyrean Films to do research for potential film projects. Using an advertisement in The Times Literary Supplement, Kubrick would hire a number of readers who would unknowingly be assisting him on future projects. Among the literature sent to readers were: A Better Mantrap and Tomorrow Lies in Ambush by Bob Shaw, The Crying of Lot 49 by Thomas Pynchon, The Dispossessed by Ursula K. Le Guin, Engine Summer by John Crowley, The Eternal Husband by Fyodor Dostoevsky, First Love, Last Rites by Ian McEwan, Love Among the Ruins by Evelyn Waugh, and Mona Lisa Overdrive by William Gibson.

In 1995, Kubrick hired Terry Southern to write the script that would have been the sequel to Kubrick's 1964 film Dr. Strangelove. The film was to have been titled Son of Strangelove, and Kubrick wanted Terry Gilliam to direct it. The script was never completed.

While working with Ian Watson on the story for A.I. Artificial Intelligence, Kubrick asked Watson for a pre-print copy of his Warhammer 40,000 tie-in novel Inquisitor. Watson quotes Kubrick as saying: "Who knows, Ian? Maybe this is my next movie?"

Following a 2010 announcement about the development of the Lunatic at Large project, plans for the prospective production of two other unrealized Kubrick projects were also announced. As of August 2012, Downslope and God Fearing Man were in development by Philip Hobbs and producer Steve Lanning, in partnership with independent company Entertainment One (eOne). A press release described Downslope as an "epic Civil War drama", while God Fearing Man is the "true story of Canadian minister Herbert Emerson Wilson." In 2021, Frank Darabont revealed that he wrote a draft of Downslope and that Ridley Scott would produce the movie.

In March 2013, Anthony Frewin, Kubrick's assistant for many years, wrote in an article in The Atlantic: "He [Kubrick] was limitlessly interested in anything to do with Nazis and desperately wanted to make a film on the subject". The article included information on another Kubrick World War II film that was never realized, based on the life story of Dietrich Schulz-Koehn, a Nazi officer who used the pen name "Dr. Jazz" to write reviews of German music scenes during the Nazi era. Kubrick had been given a copy of the Mike Zwerin book Swing Under the Nazis (the front cover of which featured a photograph of Schulz-Koehn) after he had finished production on Full Metal Jacket. However, a screenplay was never completed and Kubrick's film adaptation plan was never initiated (the unfinished Aryan Papers was another factor in the abandonment of the project).

In between Eyes Wide Shut and A.I., Kubrick was interested in making a film, for children and young adults, based on H. Rider Haggard's viking epic novel, Eric Brighteyes.

In 2015, a long-time assistant of Kubrick's, Emilio D'Alessandro, addressed that prior to his death that Kubrick was considering making a movie of Pinocchio. D'Alessandro said that Kubrick sent him to buy Italian books about Pinocchio. "He wanted to make it in his own because so many Pinocchios have been made. He wanted to do something really big… He said; 'It would [be] very nice if I could make children laugh and feel happy making this Pinocchio'". (Kubrick eventually used the project based on Brian Aldiss short story as his "Pinocchio film"). D'Alessandro also stated that Kubrick's lifelong fascination in World War II led to an interest in the Battle of Monte Cassino. D'Alessandro, who is from Cassino, said: "Stanley said that would be an interesting film to make. He asked me to get hold of things ... like newspaper cuttings and find out the distance from the airport, train stations. He had a friend who actually bombarded Monte Cassino during the war ... It is horrible to remember those days. Everything was completely destroyed”.

== See also ==
- Stanley Kubrick bibliography
- Stanley Kubrick filmography

== Bibliography ==
- Baxter, John (1999). Stanley Kubrick: A Biography. Seuil. ISBN 978-0-7867-0485-9.
- Castle, Alison (2009). Stanley Kubrick's Napoleon: The Greatest Movie Never Made. Taschen. ISBN 978-3-8228-3065-9.
- Caldwell, Thomas (March 27, 2006). "(Review of) The wolf at the door: Stanley Kubrick, history & the Holocaust". Screening the Past. 19. La Trobe University. ISSN 1328-9756.
- Ciment, Michel (1982). "Kubrick on A Clockwork Orange: An interview with Michel Ciment". The Kubrick Site.
- Cocks, Geoffrey (2004). The Wolf at the Door: Stanley Kubrick, History, and the Holocaust. Peter Lang. ISBN 0-8204-7115-1.
- Drout, Michael D. C., ed. (2006). J.R.R. Tolkien Encyclopedia: Scholarship and Critical Assessment. Routledge. ISBN 0-415-96942-5.
- Duncan, Paul (2003). Stanley Kubrick: The Complete Films. Taschen GmbH. ISBN 978-3-8365-2775-0.
- Dupont, Joan (September 15, 2001). "Kubrick Speaks, Through Family's Documentary". New York Times. Archived from the original on June 26, 2009.
- LoBrutto, Vincent (1999). Stanley Kubrick: A Biography. Da Capo Press. ISBN 978-0-306-80906-4.
- Mason, Darryl (October 4, 2000). "The Greatest Movie Stanley Kubrick Never Made". Salon. Archived from the original on November 10, 2011.
- Naperstak, Ben (December 15, 2007). "The Armani of Literature". Melbourne: The Age.
- Webster, Patrick (December 21, 2010). Love and Death in Kubrick: A Critical Study of the Films from Lolita through Eyes Wide Shut. Macfarland & Company, Inc. ISBN 9780786461912.
