= Scrabo Tower =

19th-century folly in Northern Ireland

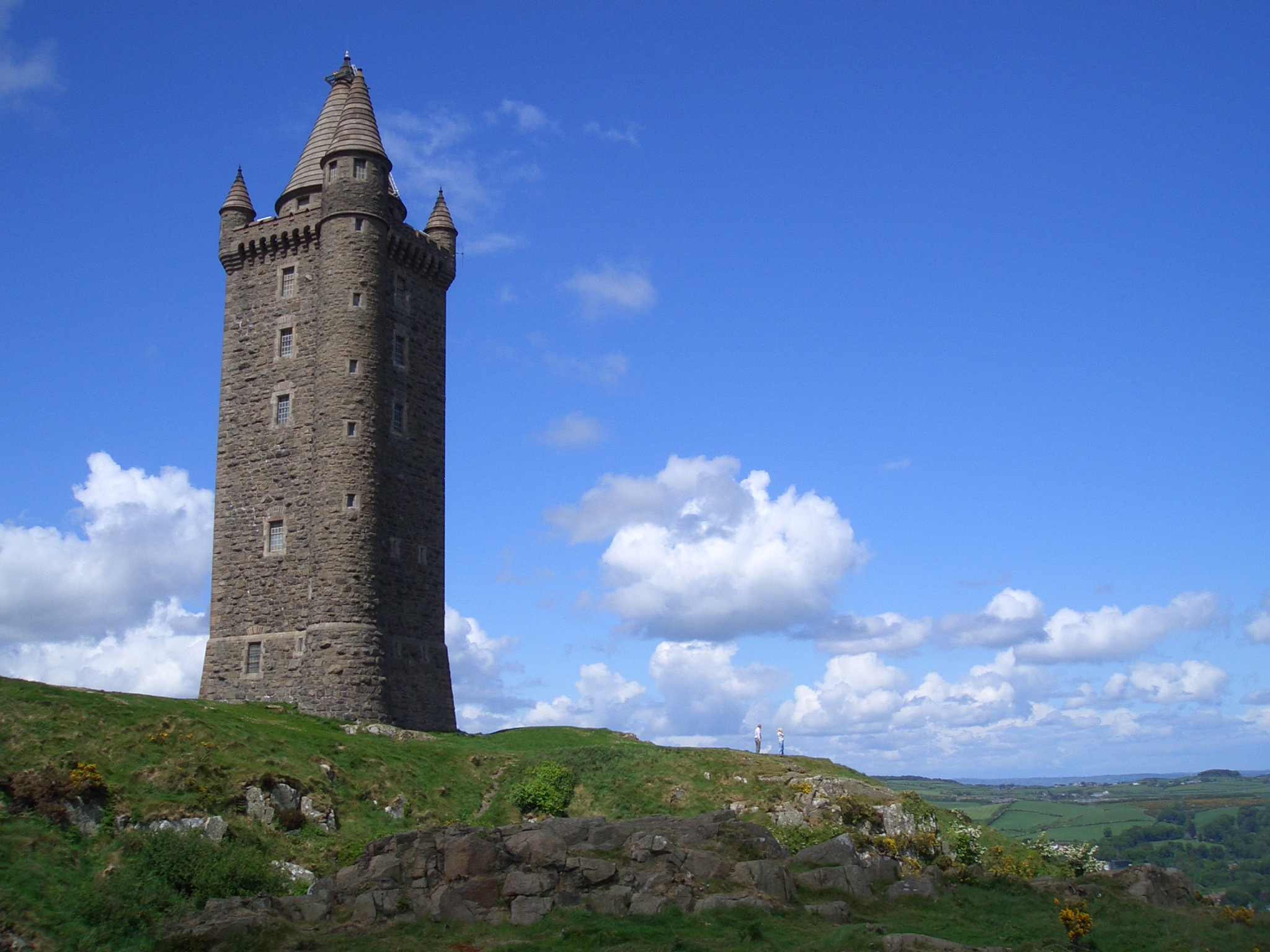
- Scrabo Tower, May 2007

- Location in Northern Ireland
- 54.58010°N 5.7155°W

History
- Built: 1857–1859

Site notes
- Architect(s): Lanyon & Lynn

Listed Building – Grade B+
- Designated: 1977
- Reference no.: HB24/11/031

Scrabo Tower is a 135 feet (41 m) high 19th-century lookout tower or folly that stands on Scrabo Hill near Newtownards in County Down, Northern Ireland. It provides wide views and is a landmark that can be seen from afar. It was built as a memorial to Charles Vane, 3rd Marquess of Londonderry and was originally known as the Londonderry Monument. Its architectural style is Scottish Baronial Revival.

== Name and location ==
Nowadays, the tower on Scrabo Hill is usually just called Scrabo Tower and is visited for its views and surroundings. However, its original name was Londonderry Monument or Memorial. That name referred to the Marquesses of Londonderry and only indirectly to the city or county of that name, which is 87 miles (140 km) away. The marquesses owned much ground around the hill. The hill and tower rise over the town of Newtownards, 10 miles (16 km) east of Belfast. As the tower dominates the town, it is often used as an emblem for Newtownards. The tower is built on the site of a prehistoric hill fort. Scrabo is pronounced /ˈskræboʊ/ according to the British Broadcasting Corporation (BBC) or /ˈskrɑːboʊ/ according to the pronunciation heard on the Placenames Database of Ireland website. The pronunciation is attested in the old spelling variant 'Scraboh'.

The Northern Ireland Place-Name Project derives the name from Irish screabach meaning "thinly covered rock" or "rough stony land". It was anglicized 'Scrabock' in the 16th century. Screabach is also the Irish name of Scrabo townland, in which the hill stands. Another suggestion is that the name comes from Irish scraith bó, meaning "sward of the cow", "cow pasture", or "sod of the cow".

== History ==
=== Origins ===
The tower commemorates the 3rd Marquess of Londonderry, who was born Charles William Stewart in 1788. He fought in the Napoleonic Wars. He married twice, first to Catherine Bligh and then to Frances Anne Vane. His second wife was a rich heiress and the marriage contract obliged him to change his surname to hers, which explains why he was first called Stewart and later Vane. He succeeded his half-brother Viscount Castlereagh as marquess in 1822 and became owner of the family estate in County Down. The estate's great house, Mount Stewart, became his Irish residence but after his second marriage he lived mostly in England.

In 1854, when the 3rd Marquess died, his eldest son, Frederick Stewart, 4th Marquess of Londonderry, and his widow, the dowager marchioness, decided to build him a monument. As these two were not at good terms, each conceived and pushed his or her own project. Two monuments resulted: the Irish tower discussed here and an equestrian statue in Durham, England.

A committee was formed in Newtownards to raise funds by subscription for an Irish monument. The local gentry, together with the late marquess's friends - including Napoleon III of France - donated most of the money, with some of the tenants also contributing. Altogether 730 people subscribed. The person behind these efforts was his eldest son Frederick Stewart, 4th Marquess of Londonderry.

The funds raised allowed for a budget of £2000. At first, the monument was to be built in Newtownards, but it was later shifted to Scrabo Hill where it could be seen from Mount Stewart and where suitable building stone was quarried. In December 1855 the committee resolved to hold a design competition. The deadline was 1 February 1856. Four entries were considered: an obelisk and three towers. The first prize went to the obelisk, which was submitted by William Joseph Barre. However, the obelisk came to nothing and indeed none of the first three projects was executed. When the committee called for tenders from building contractors, all the submissions for the three best-rated entries exceeded the budget and were therefore rejected. Finally, a tender by Hugh Dixon from Newtownards for the fourth project was accepted. However, supporters of William Barre claimed that the competition had been rigged.

The fourth design had been submitted by the firm Lanyon & Lynn, a partnership of Charles Lanyon and William Henry Lynn that lasted from the mid-1850s to 1860. The design showed a tower in the Scottish Baronial style that could be understood as a peel tower and a symbol of the landlord as a chivalrous protector of his tenants in times of danger. Such a tower was considered especially suitable for a Stewart as the Stewarts or Stuarts ruled Scotland during the times when peel towers were erected.

The 5th Baron Dufferin and Claneboye, a neighbour of the Londonderrys, had recently built Helen's Tower, also in the Scottish Baronial style, on the next hill to the north of Scrabo. The new tower was to be more than twice the height, and be situated on a bare hilltop so that, unlike Helen's Tower concealed by trees, it could be seen from a great distance.

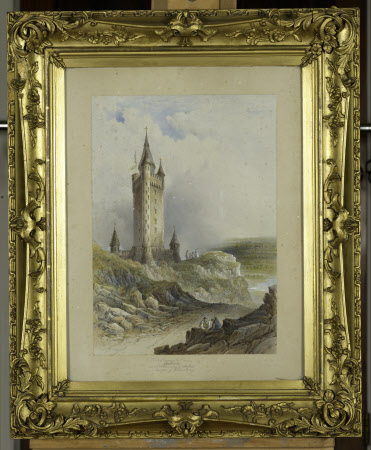
Artist' View of the Londonderry Memorial Tower, believed to represent the original project by Lanyon & Lynn

A gilt-framed picture of the Scrabo Tower, which seems to be a coloured-in wood engraving, is preserved at Mount Stewart. It gives an artist's view of the Londonderry Monument, showing three towers linked by two short stretches of crenellated wall. The middle tower resembles the one built. The others are much smaller. Wood engravings similar to this picture have been published in the Illustrated London News and the Dublin Builder. It seems that these pictures represent the original project before simplification to cut cost. Lynn's obituary in the Irish Builder attributes the design to Lynn.

The foundation stone was laid on 27 February 1857 by Sir Robert Bateson and blessed by the Church of Ireland bishop of the diocese on demand by William Sharman Crawford, chairman of the Building Committee, in a ceremony attended by the 4th Marquess, his wife, many members of the gentry, and a crowd of residents and tenants. The Dowager Marchioness, the 4th Marquess's stepmother, was conspicuously absent.

The construction generally followed the accepted plans, but the tower's height was shortened and its form was simplified by omitting the crenellated walls and the wing towers. Work ceased in 1859 after the cost had risen to £3010. The contractor was ruined, and the interior was left unfinished. In 1865 the Dublin Builder somewhat belatedly published an article about the tower. The author's purpose seems to have been to defend Lanyon and the Londonderrys against accusations of having rigged the competition. This article overstates the tower's height as 195 feet instead of 135 and understates the cost of the tower as £2300 instead of £3010. It also exaggerates the contribution made by the tenants to imply that the tower was exclusively financed by the tenants.

=== Symbolism ===
Those loyal to the Stewart family suggested the inspiration for the memorial lay in the gratitude of his tenantry for the solicitude the Marquess had shown during the Great Famine. This seems improbable given the criticism directed toward him in those years. Londonderry refused to consider rent reductions, had objected to public works schemes for famine relief, and while making contributions of £30 to the local soup kitchens in 1847, spent £15,000 renovating their home in Mount Stewart. Only 450 subscribers were connected to the estate on which there were 1,200 tenants farmers and many associated employees (in 1850, organised in the all-Ireland Tenant Right League, 700 of these tenants had signed an address demanding tenant right and lower rents). Two thirds of the cost of the tower was met by 98 subscribers (in a list headed by Emperor Napoleon III) most of whom were fellow gentry. The tower is massive and imposing, symbolizing, if anything, landlord power. Size and mass were the "chief objects" according to the Dublin Builder. In later appreciations it is found "more curious than beautiful" and "one of the finest examples of 19th-century folly towers".

=== Later events ===
After the tower's completion in 1859, a foreman of the quarry moved into the tower as caretaker. The caretaker's family, the McKay family, ran a tearoom in the tower until the 1960s. The tower and the grounds on which it stands were then acquired by the state. In 1977, the tower was listed as a Grade B+ historic building. The Department of Environment spent £20,000 on the tower in 1992, repairing windows, repointing the masonry, adding lightning protection and fitting in a wooden floor between the second and third floor, which had been omitted in 1859 to cut costs. The tower now stands in the Scrabo Country Park, which is managed by the Northern Ireland Environment Agency (NIEA). In 2014, the NIEA announced that water ingress had damaged the electricity supply, and citing safety concerns, closed the tower to visitors. By 2015, the tower opened occasionally, and in 2017 it was fully reopened to the public.

== Architecture ==
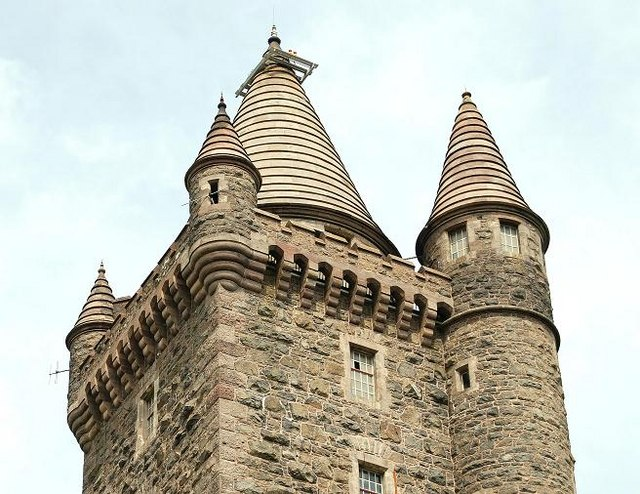
The tower's roofs in 2009. Note the lapped stone roofs. The frame added near the top carries two aircraft warning lights.

The tower's style is called Scottish Baronial by most recent authors.: "... mysteriously designed in the Scottish baronial style ..." The article in the Illustrated London News of 1857 says "... in the style of a Scottish chateau ...", whereas the article in the Dublin Builder of 1865 calls it "Scotch baronial". Its height is 135 feet (41 m) as can be confirmed by measuring the scaled elevation drawing in Howley (1993). However, heights of 125 feet and 195 feet have been given.

The tower consists of a base, a main body and a crenellated and turreted roof. The base contains the ground floor. It has battered (sloped) outer surfaces. The main body has vertical walls. The limit between the base and the main body is marked by a sandstone belt course. The base and the main body are square in plan and comprise a round stair tower, comprising 122 steps, that projects from the southeast corner. The tower's square part is surmounted by a short setback cylindrical storey that is covered with a steep conical roof. The transition from square to round is achieved by a platform decorated with four corner turrets linked by machicolated battlements. The turrets are round and also wear steep conical roofs. The five roofs are entirely built in lapped stone courses. The southeastern turret serves as cap-house over the stairs giving access to the parapet walk (or chemin de ronde). The other three turrets are smaller and sit on corbelled bases. Each of these bases consists of a pile of five roll-moulded corbel courses. A chimney stack is attached to the inner side of the northwestern turret.

The tower's entrance door is on the north face. It is accessed by a short outer stair. The door is surmounted by a commemorative plaque in a bluish black stone, probably slate. The inscription dedicates the monument to the 3rd Marquess. Following his change of surname, he is called Vane rather than Stewart. The post-nominal KG stands for Knight of the Garter. The "& c" should be read "et cetera" and means that the marquess's many lesser post-nominals were omitted.

Erected
in memory of
Charles William Vane
3^{rd} Marquis of Londonderry
KG & c
by his tenantry and friends

Fame belongs to history, remembrance to us
1857

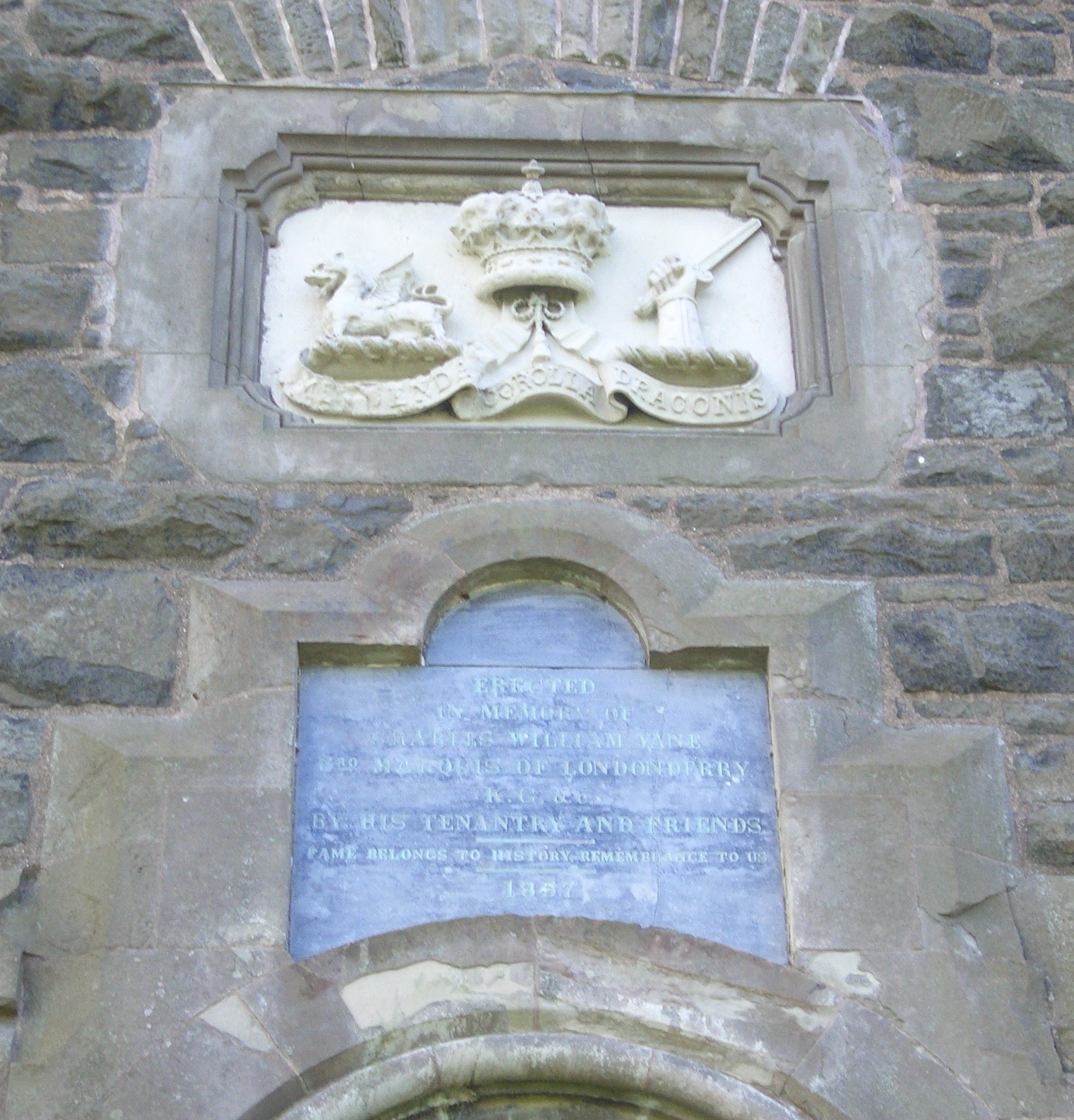
Inscription surmounted by a relief showing Londonderry coronet, crests & motto

Above the plaque is a recess filled with a relief in white limestone or marble showing the coronet, two crests (dragon and sword arm), and the motto of the marquesses of Londonderry. The relief is deeply undercut under the coronet and behind the dragon's wing. The coronet is decorated with three leaves and two balls as befits a marquess. The dragon crest represents the Stewart family. The arm (more precisely "cubit") with the hand in a gauntlet holding a sword represents the Vane family. The scroll below the coronet and the crests shows the motto (in Latin), which reads: Metuenda corolla draconis (the dragon's crest is to be feared).

The tower should have had eight levels according to the placement of its windows on the wood engraving: the ground floor in the base, six floors in the main body and one in the setback masonry cylinder that occupies the centre of the platform and carries the main roof. When work stopped in 1859, only the ground floor and the first floor had floors and ceilings. All the space in the tower above the first floor's ceiling right up into the cone of the main roof was left empty. The ground floor was the caretaker's apartment. The first floor was planned as an armoury as would be required in a peel tower but was never equipped and used as such. This armoury is covered with a brick groin vault, which is the reason why the spacing between the armoury's windows and those of the second floor is wider than those between the other levels in the main body. A proper second floor was created later by inserting a wooden floor as part of the repairs and the upgrading done by the Department of Environment. This second floor was thus gained on the remaining undivided space.

Two types of stone were used in the tower: whitish to pinkish Triassic sandstone and dark-grey dolerite. The sandstone, more suitable for fine carvings, was used for quoins, window dressings, stairs, corbels, copings and roofs, as well as for courses that mark limits: the moulding between the base and the main body and the one that separates the stair tower from the cap-house above it. The dolerite is described as whinstone or as basalt in various sources. This material is harder and more resistant to weathering than the sandstone but difficult to work. It was cut into blocks of variable size and laid in frequently interrupted courses. The outer surfaces of these blocks were left in rough rustication with many blocks quite prominent.

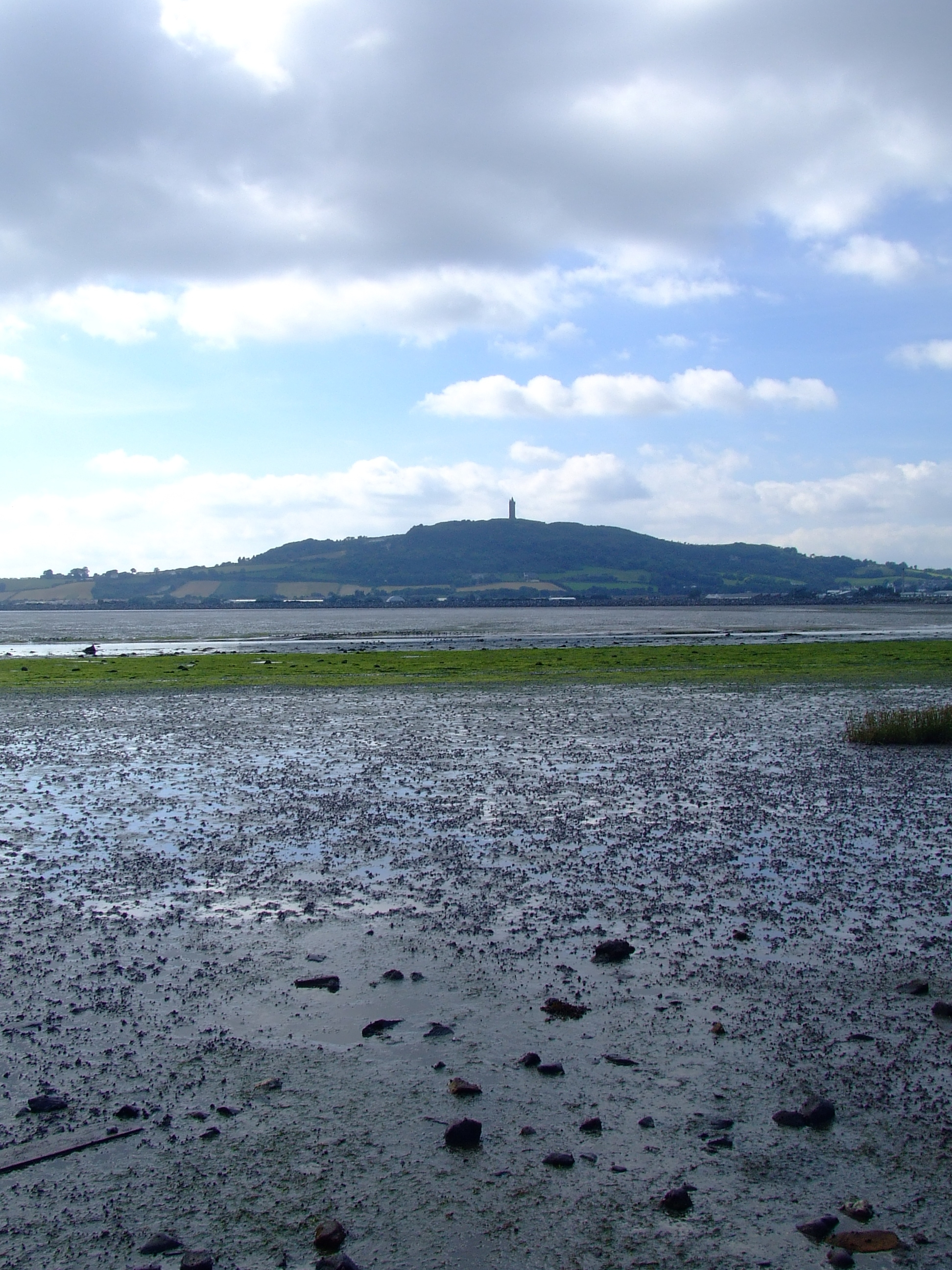
The tower, seen from the other side of Strangford Lough

== Surroundings and view ==
Scrabo Hill rises to a height of 540 feet (160 m) above mean sea level. The viewing platform or parapet walk of the tower, reached by climbing 122 steps, provides views over Strangford Lough and its islands, as well as the towns of Newtownards and Comber. As the area to the south and southwest of Scrabo Hill is part of the Ulster Drumlin Belt, this glacial landform can be very well observed from the tower.

On clear days Helen's Tower in the north, the Copeland Islands with their lighthouse and the Scottish coast (Mull of Kintyre, Ailsa Craig and Rhins of Galloway) beyond the North Channel in the northeast, the Isle of Man in the southeast, the Mourne Mountains in the south, as well as Divis Mountain and Cave Hill over Belfast in the west can be seen.

Scrabo Country Park, in which the tower stands, includes parts of the top and the eastern and southern slopes of Scrabo Hill as well as Killynether Wood. The eastern part of the hill is of geological interest because outcrops in the South Quarry reveal contacts between sediments (sandstone) and locally cross-cutting sills of intrusive rocks (dolerite). This eastern part, which includes the site of the tower, has been declared an Area of Special Scientific Interest (ASSI). Much of the plateau on top of the hill to the west of the tower is occupied by Scrabo Golf Course.

== In fiction ==
The Enchanted Duplicator, a story by the Northern Irish writers Walt Willis and Bob Shaw, features the Tower of Trufandom (true fandom), which was inspired by Scrabo Tower. Patrick Nielsen Hayden and his wife Teresa tell in an article published in Number 37 of the Hyphen, a periodic edited by Walt Willis, how they visited Scrabo Tower with Walt Willis in a literary pilgrimage.

== See also ==
- List of tourist attractions in Ireland

== Sources ==
=== Books ===
- Brett, Charles Edward Bainbridge (2002). Buildings of North County Down. Belfast: Ulster Architectural Heritage Society. ISBN 978-0900457579.
- Dublin Builder (15 May 1865). "The Londonderry Monument, Scraboh Hill, Co Down". The Dublin Builder. 7 (130): 124.
- Historic Building Details - HB Ref No: HB24/11/031. Belfast: Department for Communities.
- Howley, James (1993). The Follies and Garden Buildings of Ireland. New Haven, Connecticut: Yale University Press. ISBN 0-300-10225-9.
- Hull, Edward (1872). The Building and Ornamental Stones of Great Britain and Foreign Countries. London: Macmillan & Co.
- Hyde, Harford Montgomery (1979). The Londonderrys - A Family Portrait. London: Hamish Hamilton. ISBN 0241101530.
- Illustrated London News (1857). "Memorial To The Late Marquis Of Londonderry, In Course Of Erection On Scrabo Hill, County Down, Ireland". The Illustrated London News (March 28, 1857): 299.
- Jones, Barbara Mildred (1974). Follies and Grottoes (2nd, heavily revised and enlarged ed.). London: Constable & Co. ISBN 978-0094593503. - Scrabo seems not to be mentioned in the 1st edition, published in 1953.
- Lloyd, Ernest Marsh; Heesom, A. J. (2004). "Vane, Charles William, third marquess of Londonderry (1778–1854)". In Matthew, Colin; Harrison, Brian (eds.). Oxford Dictionary of National Biography. Vol. 56. New York: Oxford University Press. pp. 95–98. ISBN 0-19-861406-3.
- McCavery, Trevor (1994). Newtown - A history of Newtownards. Belfast: The White Row Press. ISBN 9781870132701.
- McKay, Patrick (2007). A Dictionary of Ulster Place-Names (2nd ed.). Belfast: Cló Ollscoil na Banríona. ISBN 978-0-85389-896-2.
- Nielsen Hayden, Patrick James; Nielsen Hayden, Teresa (August 1987). "Aspects and Inclinations". Hyphen (37).
- Pointon, Graham E. (1990). BBC Pronouncing Dictionary of British Names (2nd ed.). Oxford: Oxford University Press. ISBN 0-19-282745-6.
- Vane, Charles William (1828). Narrative of the Peninsular War. London: Henry Colburn.
- Williams, Jeremy (1995). A Companion Guide to Architecture in Ireland 1837-1921. Dublin: Irish Academic Press. ISBN 978-0716525134.

==== News ====
- "Whitehall, May 5, 1819", The London Gazette, no. 17480, 25 May 1819
