= Portrait of Frances Vane =

1818 painting by Thomas Lawrence

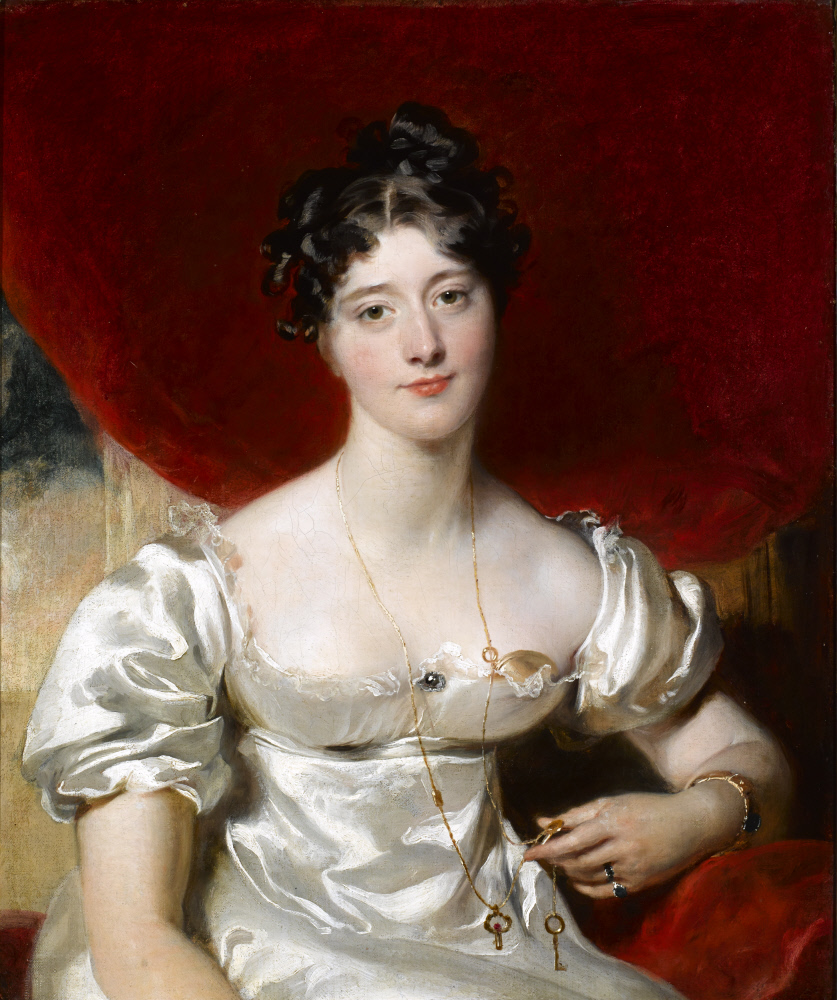
- Artist: Thomas Lawrence
- Year: 1818
- Type: Oil on canvas, portrait painting
- Dimensions: 74.9 cm × 62.2 cm (29.5 in × 24.5 in)
- Location: Mount Stewart; County Down

Portrait of Frances Vane is an 1818 portrait painting by the British artist Thomas Lawrence. It depicts the Anglo-Irish heiress and political hostess Frances Vane.

She is pictured aged eighteen at the time of her engagement to the soldier and diplomat Sir Charles Stewart, then Ambassador to Vienna and the younger brother of the Foreign Secretary Lord Castlereagh. After Castlereagh's suicide in 1822, he inherited his brother's title and Frances became the Marchioness of Londonderry. She and her husband became notable society figures and influential in the Tory Party. They were the great grandparents of Winston Churchill.

Lawrence received many commissions from Stewart and painted him frequently. Two years after producing this picture Lawrence was elected President of the Royal Academy. In 1828 he produced another notable portrait of Vane, now Lady Londonderry, with her eldest son George which was displayed at the Royal Academy Exhibition of 1828.

After Lawrence's death in 1830 this painting was exhibited posthumously at the British Institution in Pall Mall. It is in the collection of the former Londonderry Irish estate Mount Stewart in County Down, administered by the National Trust.

== See also ==
- Portrait of the Marchioness of Londonderry, an 1831 painting by Alexandre-Jean Dubois-Drahonet

== Bibliography ==
- Levey, Michael. Sir Thomas Lawrence. Yale University Press, 2005.
- Payne, Reider. War and Diplomacy in the Napoleonic Era: Sir Charles Stewart, Castlereagh and the Balance of Power in Europe. Bloomsbury Publishing, 2021.
