= Portrait of the Marchioness of Londonderry =

Painting by Alexandre-Jean Dubois-Drahonet

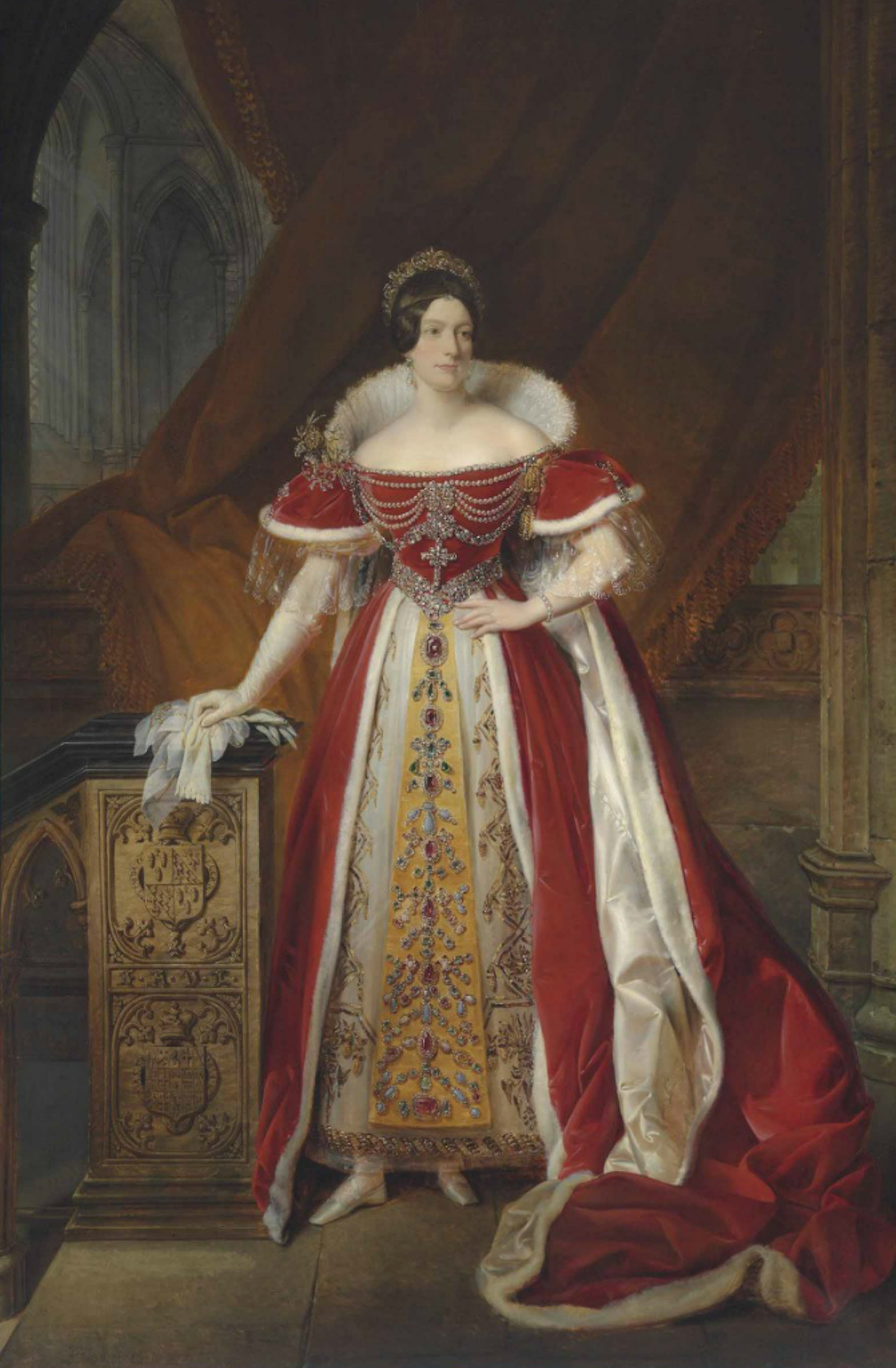
- Artist: Alexandre-Jean Dubois-Drahonet
- Year: 1831
- Type: Oil on canvas, portrait painting
- Dimensions: 268.6 cm × 178.4 cm (105.7 in × 70.2 in)
- Location: Victoria and Albert Museum, London

Portrait of the Marchioness of Londonderry is an 1831 portrait painting by the French artist Alexandre-Jean Dubois-Drahonet. It depicts Frances Vane, Marchioness of Londonderry. An heiress with vast wealth from coal on her family's lands in the North of England, she was an influential political hostess for the Tory Party. In 1819 she had married the Irish soldier and diplomat Lord Stewart, the younger brother of the politician Lord Castlereagh, who became Marquess of Londonderry in 1822.

The Marchioness is shown in full-length wearing the jewel-festooned dress she wore to the Coronation of William IV and Adelaide in September 1831. The backdrop is Westminster Abbey. It is not known how Dubois-Drahonet came to paint the picture as he had previously been active in Continental Europe exhibiting at the Paris Salons rather than in Britain. Lord Londonderry may have been influenced in awarding the commission by his 1827 painting of the Duchesses of Berry in a jewel-coverered gown.

In 2014 it was auctioned at Christie's. Part of a private collection, it has been on loan to the Victoria and Albert Museum in London.

The following year Dubois-Drahonet was commissioned by William IV to paint a portrait of her husband in the uniform of the 10th Hussars, which remains in the Royal Collection.

== See also ==
- Portrait of Frances Vane, an 1818 painting by Thomas Lawrence

== Bibliography ==
- Payne, Reider. War and Diplomacy in the Napoleonic Era: Sir Charles Stewart, Castlereagh and the Balance of Power in Europe. Bloomsbury Publishing, 2021
