= The Ragged Astronauts =

1986 novel by Bob Shaw

- First edition cover
- Author: Bob Shaw
- Cover artist: Alan Brooks
- Language: English
- Series: Land and Overland
- Release number: 1
- Genre: Science fiction
- Publisher: Gollancz
- Publication date: 1986
- Publication place: United Kingdom
- Media type: Print (hardback)
- Pages: 310
- Awards: BSFA Award for Best Novel (1986)
- ISBN: 978-0-575-03639-0
- OCLC: 59196211
- Followed by: The Wooden Spaceships

The Ragged Astronauts is a science fiction novel by British writer Bob Shaw, published in 1986 by Gollancz. It is the first book in the series Land and Overland. It won the BSFA Award for Best Novel.

The novel is set on the fictional twin planets of Land and Overland, which happen to share the same atmosphere. Land is running out of resources due to overexploitation, and its authorities are planning a mass migration towards Overland. The process is complicated by rioting and an ongoing global pandemic.

== Plot summary ==
The novel is set on a planet whose inhabitants can use a hot-air balloon for interplanetary travel to another, close planet that share the same atmosphere. The feudal residents of Land have to migrate to the nearby planet of Overland due to overexploitation of resources on their homeworld. The story is told from the perspective of nobleman Toller Maraquine who clashes with a military Prince before and during the chaotic evacuation accelerated by rioting and a global pandemic.

== Reception ==
Dave Langford reviewed The Ragged Astronauts for White Dwarf #81, and stated that "Pi, in this book, equals 3. Therefore the universe isn't ours, the gravitational constant is different, and physicists will kindly pipe down."

Wendy Graham reviewed The Ragged Astronauts for Adventurer magazine and stated that "I in fact did quite enjoy the book, but I'll reserve judgement until the other two come my way - I'm hoping that the hero turns out to have, well not totally feet of clay, but maybe a few more earthy toenails at least. There is at least a good point to be taken about man messing with the environment."

== Reviews ==
- Review by Chris Morgan (1986) in Fantasy Review, September 1986
- Review by Dan Chow (1986) in Locus, #309 October 1986
- Review by Don D'Ammassa (1987) in Science Fiction Chronicle, #96 September 1987
- Review by Helen McNabb (1987) in Paperback Inferno, #68
- Review by Orson Scott Card (1987) in The Magazine of Fantasy & Science Fiction, November 1987
- Review by Paul Kincaid (1987) in Foundation, #38 Winter 1986/87
- Review [French] by Pascal J. Thomas (1988) in Yellow Submarine, #57
- Review [German] by Paul Kincaid (1991) in Das Science Fiction Jahr Ausgabe 1991
- Review by Jack Fennell (unknown) in A Short Guide to Irish Science Fiction

== Awards and nominations ==
Year	Award	Result	Ref.
1986	BSFA Award for Best Novel	Won	
1987	Arthur C. Clarke Award	Nominated	
1987	Hugo Award for Best Novel	Nominated	
1987	Locus Award for Best Science Fiction Novel	25	
