= The Enchanted Duplicator =

Fan fiction about 1940s fandom

The Enchanted Duplicator is science fiction fan fiction written by Walt Willis and Bob Shaw. It was originally published in February 1954, in an edition of 200 numbered copies, and has been reprinted many times, notably in an edition illustrated by Eddie Jones in 1962; in Amazing Stories in 1972/3; and in Warhoon 28, a hardcover fanzine collection of Willis's writing, in 1980.

== Summary ==
It is an allegory of the journey of a science fiction fan, loosely based on John Bunyan's The Pilgrim's Progress (though Shaw and Willis denied having read it beforehand).

The Tower of Trufandom, the eventual location of the Enchanted Duplicator in the story, was based on Scrabo Tower in Newtownards, near Walt Willis' home in Northern Ireland.

== Sequel and stage versions ==
A sequel, Beyond the Enchanted Duplicator... To the Enchanted Convention, by Walt Willis and James White, was published in 1991 by Geri Sullivan, and illustrated by Stu Shiffman.

A musical based on the work was written by Erwin S. Strauss in 1975. A revised version premiered at the 77th World Science Fiction Convention in Dublin in 2019.

A 1982 stage version written by Shelley Dutton Berry, Gary Farber, and Jerry Kaufman was performed at the convention Norwescon 5.
