= Fire Pattern =

1984 novel by Bob Shaw

Fire Pattern is a novel by Bob Shaw published in 1984.

== Plot summary ==
Fire Pattern is a novel in which a reporter investigates victims of spontaneous human combustion.

== Reception ==
Dave Langford reviewed Fire Pattern for White Dwarf #58, and stated that "A good read but – in its implications and its appearance from witty Bob Shaw – a slightly depressing one."

== Reviews ==
- Review by Chris Morgan (1984) in Fantasy Review, October 1984
- Review by David Barrett (1984) in Vector 122
- Review by Don D'Ammassa (1986) in Science Fiction Chronicle, #87 December 1986
