= Orbitsville =

1975 novel by Bob Shaw

Cover of the first edition, published by Gollancz.

Orbitsville is a science fiction novel by British writer Bob Shaw, published in book form in 1975. It is about the discovery of a Dyson sphere-like artefact surrounding a star.

The novel had previously appeared in three installments in Galaxy Science Fiction, in June, July and August 1974. After its publication as a book it won the British Science Fiction Award for the best novel in 1976.

Shaw wrote two sequels, Orbitsville Departure (ISBN 0-671-69831-1), published in 1983, and Orbitsville Judgement, published in 1990.
