= Ground Zero Man =

1971 novel by Bob Shaw

- Cover of the first edition (publ. by Avon Books); Art by Vincent Di Fate
- Author: Bob Shaw
- Genre: Science fiction
- Publisher: Avon Books
- Publication date: 1971

Ground Zero Man is a 1971 science fiction novel by British writer Bob Shaw. It was republished as The Peace Machine in 1985.

== Plot summary ==
The plot follows the main character, Lucas Hutchman, an "undistinguished mathematician", who invents a machine that may detonate virtually instantaneously every nuclear bomb in the world, by inducing a "self-propagating neutron resonance". Overcoming technical and personal difficulties, Hutchman manages to build the device and to warn Earth's governments of its existence, but is tracked down and prevented from using it. At the end, Hutchman realises that rather than to the elimination of nuclear weapons, his invention just led to further investments in them, to create new bombs impervious to neutron resonance.

The ending "shows precisely and prophetically . . . the flaw in [the Eighties'] plans for 'star wars' energy-beam defences"

== Reception ==
Dave Langford reviewed The Peace Machine for White Dwarf #65, and stated that "responsibility. Its grim conclusion shows precisely and prophetically (1976, remember) the flaw in today's plans for 'star wars' energy-beam defences."

Colin Greenland reviewed The Peace Machine for Imagine magazine, and stated that "includes revisions for a more nuclear conscious audience, but it's still largely quite a traditional thriller, as compulsive and characterful as anything by Shaw."

Wendy Graham reviewed The Peace Machine for Adventurer magazine and stated that "Maybe Shaw could go back and look again at the idea, get rid of the wife and give Hutchman an engineer friend. For once I think the story could be longer too."

== Reviews ==
- Review by Roger Drayne (1971) in Locus, #97 October 1, 1971
- Review by Peter Nicholls (1972) in Foundation, #2 June 1972
- Review by Philip Stephensen-Payne (1977) in Paperback Parlour, February 1977
- Review [French] by Michel Jeury (1978) in Fiction, #293
- Review by Debbie Notkin (1985) in Locus, #291 April 1985
- Review by Chris Bailey (1985) in Vector 124/125
- Review by Chris Morgan (1985) in Fantasy Review, April 1985
- Review by Nicholas Mahoney (1987) in Paperback Inferno, #66
- Review by Jack Fennell (unknown) in A Short Guide to Irish Science Fiction
