= Dark Night In Toyland =

1989 short story collection by Bob Shaw

Dark Night in Toyland
- First edition
- Author: Bob Shaw
- Language: English
- Genre: Science fiction short stories
- Publisher: Gollancz
- Publication date: March 1989
- Publication place: United Kingdom
- Media type: Print (Hardcover)
- Pages: 190 pp
- ISBN: 0-575-04448-9

Dark Night in Toyland (ISBN 0-575-04448-9) is a collection of science fiction short stories by Bob Shaw, first published in 1989.

== The stories ==
=== "Dark Night in Toyland" ===
(First published in Interzone, Nov–Dec 1988.) The story is set in the near future. Timmy, the son of Kirkham, a Methodist minister, and his wife Dora, will soon die of spinal cancer. On his last Christmas one of his presents is "Biodoh", which he has chosen: it is a construction kit from which seemingly living creatures can be made. Kirkham reluctantly consented to giving this present, although he thinks there is "something unwholesome" about it. Soon after Timmy's death Kirkham finds that his son has made a small living version of himself.

=== "Go On, Pick a Universe!" ===
(First published in The Magazine of Fantasy & Science Fiction, March 1981.) A man with low self-esteem visits "Alterealites Inc", a shop in New York which can send him to a choice of countless other universes where the inhabitants may have a higher regard for him. He has three attempts to find a suitable universe.

=== "Stormseeker" ===
(First published in Galaxy Magazine, Jan–Feb 1972.) After "World War Three Point Three Repeating", the narrator, on one of many aerial excursions in "a silent sled", detects the location of a coming storm; he guides it and communicates with a physicist working in an underground laboratory, telling him when to activate a mast and receive a lightning-strike to power his experiment.

=== "Aliens Aren't Human" ===
(First published in Extro Science Fiction, Apr–May 1982.) New Sicily is a colony of people from Earth on an alien planet. Ciano, Ritzo and other members of the colony's ruling family intend to mine minerals without the consent of Kston, the local representative. Although peaceful and childlike, Kston is physically indestructible, hardly noticing an assassination attempt, and is strong enough to unintentionally kill people; he realizes he can overcome the colonists.

=== "Love Me Tender" ===
(First published in New Terrors, 1980.) An escaped convict, on the run in the Everglades of Florida, finds a wooden shanty where he can rest. Inside is an old man, sorting butterflies for lepidopterists. In a bedroom is what he thinks is a young woman, but he meets a strange fate on finding the reality.

=== "To the Letter" ===
(First published in Interzone, Jan–Feb 1989.) Recommended by a friend, a man visits Mr Zurek, who runs his business from a basement room: he can fulfill a client's wish, in exchange for his immortal soul. The man gets what he literally asks for, but not what he wished.

=== "Courageous New Planet" ===
(First published by the Birmingham Science Fiction Group, Oct 1981.) A man from the 20th century is propelled into the 25th century to save him from a traffic accident. Although he likes science fiction, he dislikes the 25th century because "there is too much of everything... none of the variety... that adds spice to life". He is relieved to find there are still football matches, but the matches are not played the way he expects.

=== "Cutting Down" ===
(First published in Isaac Asimov's Science Fiction Magazine, Dec 1982.) A journalist visits a retired scientist who worked on a cure for obesity, supposedly for a newspaper article, but actually because he wants to cure his wife's obesity. The scientist believes that adipose tissue can have a will of its own and direct the person to eat more. The journalist steals medicine from the scientist and gives it to his wife, with tragic consequences.

=== "Hue and Cry" ===
(First published in Amazing Stories, July 1969.) The inhabitants of a planet, who naturally communicate by radio waves, are in the process of understanding the behaviour of beings from a spaceship (from Earth), who communicate using radio equipment, so that they can catch and eat them.

=== "The K-Y Warriors" ===
Willet Morris finds that teaching his wife Muriel to drive a car is stressful. The husbands of Muriel's three sisters have all died, and he wonders if the deaths were due to stress. He also wonders if there is witchcraft, since Muriel and her family seem to make machinery behave perversely; a final accident with the car confirms this.

=== "Dissolute Diplomat" ===
(First published in IF, 1960.) A spaceship from Imperial Earth lands on a planet in order to get the warp generators repaired. The inhabitants are shapeshifters. The ship's captain is imperious and the local workforce are obliging, but their ignorance of humans has an unfortunate consequence for the captain.

=== "Well-Wisher" ===
(First published in The Magazine of Fantasy & Science Fiction, Nov 1979.) In the Middle East long ago, Ibn Zuhain is Lord of the Long Valley. A stranger appears when an old bottle is broken, who offers to grant him three wishes. Zuhain wants to see how the world will be in the future, so the stranger (in a play on the title of the story) transforms the fountain in Zuhain's garden.

=== "Executioner's Moon" ===
(First published in Imagine, 1985.) The two members of a vehicle surveying the planet Korrill IV are captured by primitive people. They are descendants of the crew of a spaceship that crashed here a century ago. Their king, Garadan, controls them by predicting the appearances of the many moons, which he does by monitoring a box, a computer salvaged from the crashed ship. Crucially for the crew members' lives, a prediction fails.

=== "Deflation 2001" ===
(First published in Amazing Stories, Sept 1972.) There is hyper-inflation and industrial unrest, with many strikes in the air travel industry. The voyage of a sole passenger in a small aircraft is in jeopardy when the pilot bales out with a parachute because his union has declared a strike.

=== "Shadow of Wings" ===
(First published in More Magic, June 1984.) Dardash is a retired magician, and has retained his youthful vigour aged 103. He is hired by Urtarra, astrologer to King Marcurades of Koldana, to kill the King; Urtarra has seen the future and knows that the King, although now benevolent, will become a tyrant. Dardash's task is unexpectedly difficult, and is achieved at great personal cost, because Marcurades, unknown to himself, has access to a great amount of "mana – the raw power behind magic".
