= Countess of Portarlington =

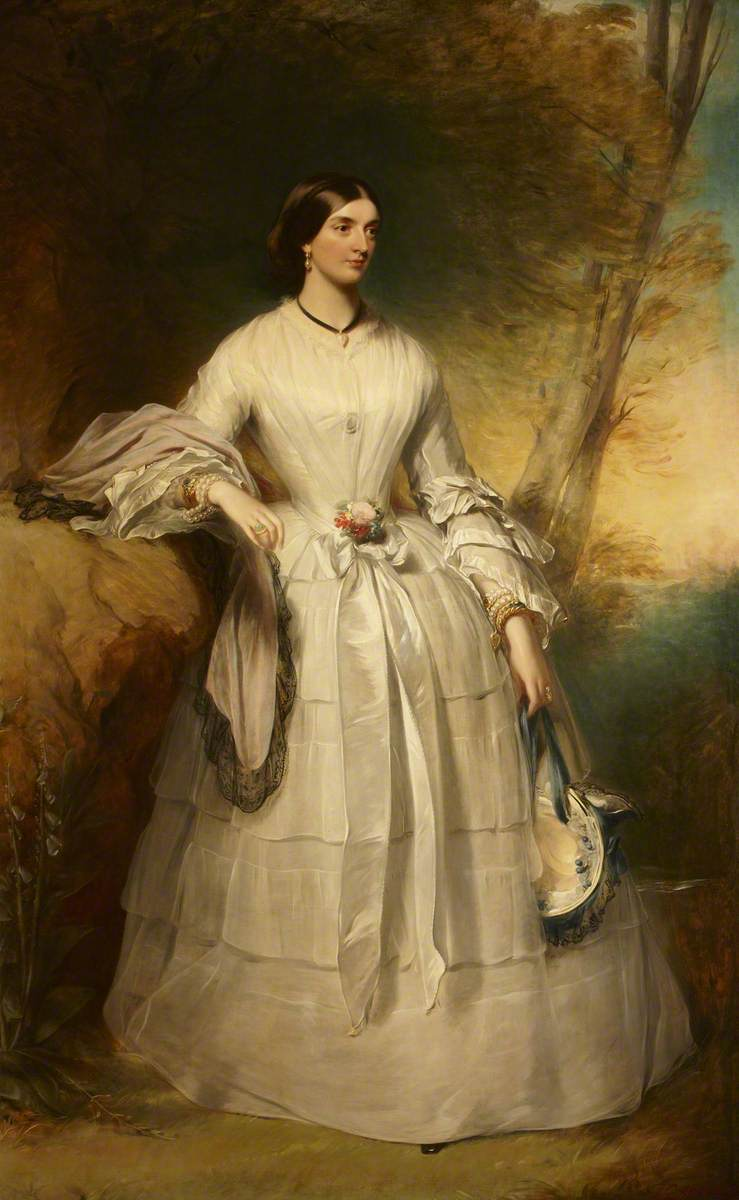
Portrait of Alexandrina Dawson-Damer, Countess of Portarlington, by James Godsell Middleton, c. 1847

Countess of Portarlington is a title used by the wife of the Earl of Portarlington.

Countess of Portarlington may refer to:

- Caroline Dawson, Countess of Portarlington, countess 1785–1813
- Alexandrina Dawson-Damer, Countess of Portarlington, countess 1847–1874
- Harriet Dawson-Damer, Countess of Portarlington, countess 1889–1894
- Emma Dawson-Damer, Countess of Portarlington, countess 1892–1901 (Viscountess Portman: 1901–1929)
- Winnifreda Dawson-Damer, Countess of Portarlington, countess 1907–1975
- Davinia Dawson-Damer, Countess of Portarlington, countess 1961–present
