= Alexandrina Dawson-Damer, Countess of Portarlington =

Irish aristocrat (1823–1874)

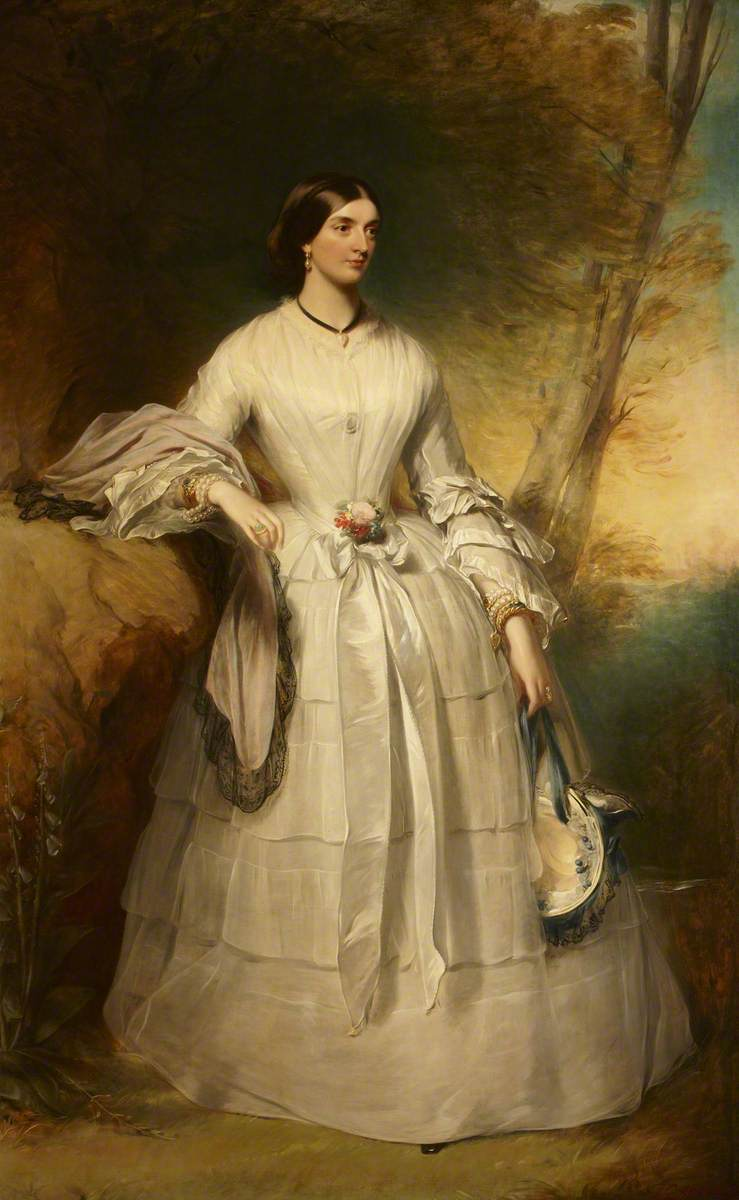
Portrait of Lady Portarlington, by James Godsell Middleton, c. 1847

Alexandrina Octavia Maria Dawson-Damer, Countess of Portarlington (née Lady Alexandrina Octavia Maria Vane; 29 July 1823 – 15 January 1874), was an Irish aristocrat who was the wife of Henry Dawson-Damer, 3rd Earl of Portarlington and the daughter of Charles Vane, 3rd Marquess of Londonderry.

== Early life ==
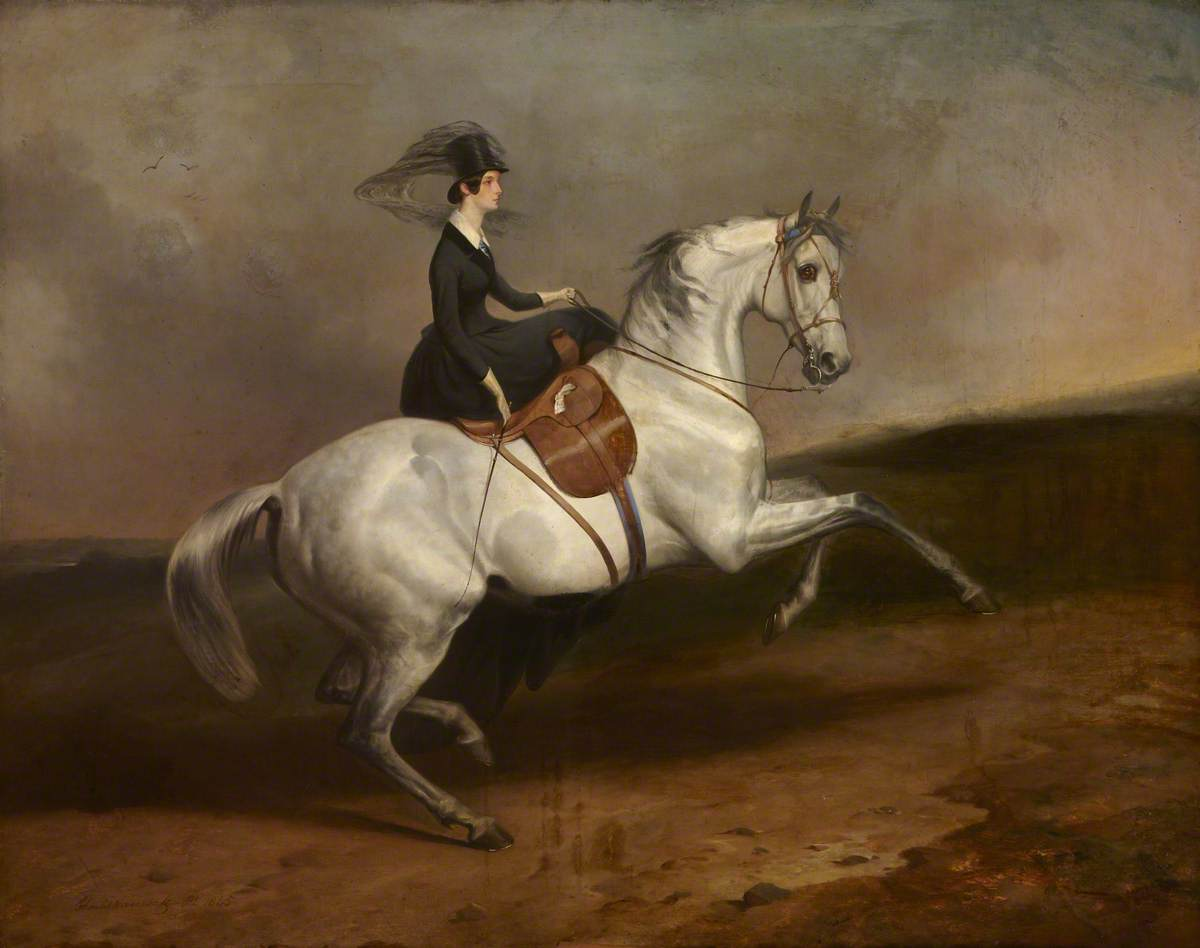
Portrait of Lady Alexandrina on a grey horse, by Charles Hancock, 1845

Lady Alexandrina, who went by "Aline", was born on 29 July 1823 and was a godchild of Alexander I of Russia. (Note: Her mother, Frances Vane, Marchioness of Londonderry, became an object of affection for Tsar Alexander I after he happened to see her engagement portrait by Sir Thomas Lawrence.) She was the second daughter of Anglo-Irish nobleman Charles Vane, 3rd Marquess of Londonderry, and his second wife, Lady Frances Vane-Tempest.

Among her siblings were George Vane-Tempest, 5th Marquess of Londonderry, Lady Frances Vane (wife of John Spencer-Churchill, 7th Duke of Marlborough, grandparents of Winston Churchill), and the politician Lord Adolphus Vane-Tempest.

Her paternal grandparents were Robert Stewart, 1st Marquess of Londonderry, and the former Lady Frances Pratt (a daughter of Charles Pratt, 1st Earl Camden). Her mother was the only daughter and heiress of Sir Henry Vane-Tempest, 2nd Baronet, and Anne MacDonnell, suo jure 2nd Countess of Antrim.

== Personal life ==
On 2 September 1847, Lady Alexandrina was married to Henry Dawson-Damer, 3rd Earl of Portarlington (1822–1889), the son of Capt. Hon. Henry Dawson-Damer, of Milton Abbey, and the former Eliza Moriarty (a daughter of Capt. Edmund Joshua Moriarty and granddaughter of Simon Luttrell, 1st Earl of Carhampton). Lord Portarlington succeeded his unmarried uncle John, the 2nd Earl, as the Earl of Portarlington in 1845, therefore, upon their marriage, she became known as the Countess of Portarlington. Lord Portarlington was a Representative peer for Ireland between 1855 and his death in 1889. They did not have any children.

Lady Portarlington converted to Catholicism in 1867 and died on 15 January 1874 at Emo Park, where she was also buried.
