= Frances Vane, Marchioness of Londonderry =

British aristocrat (1800–1865)

The Most Honourable The Marchioness of Londonderry
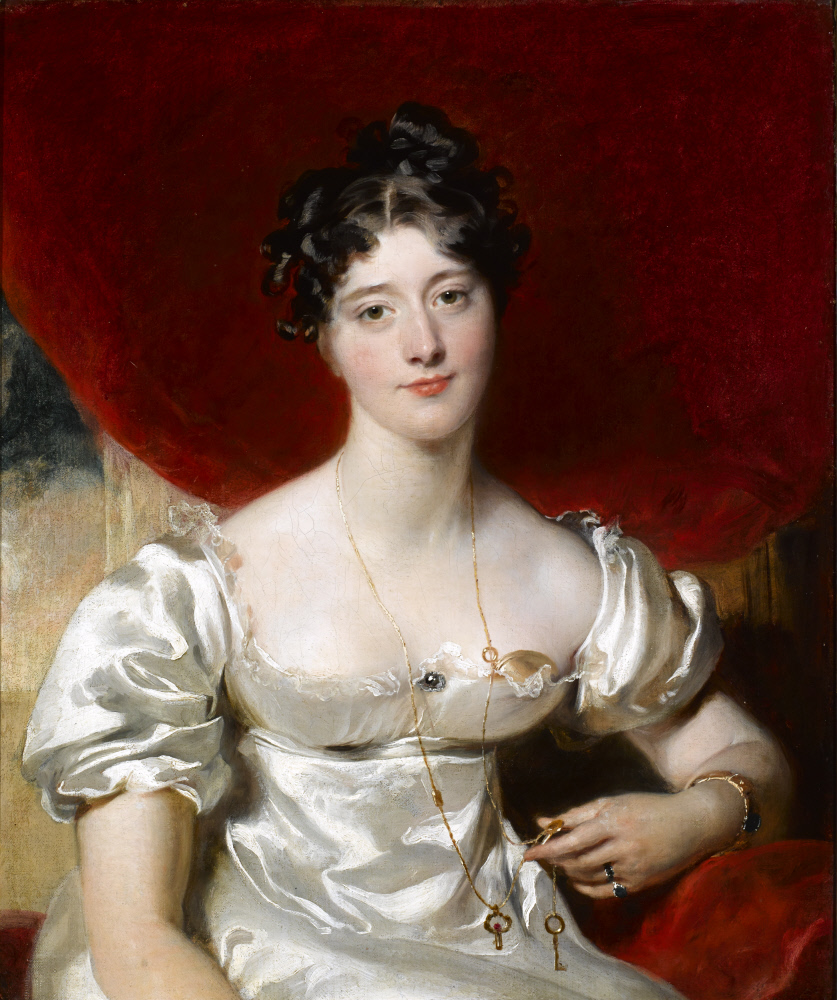
- Portrait of Frances Vane by Sir Thomas Lawrence, 1818
- Born: 17 January 1800; St James's Square, London, England
- Died: 20 January 1865 (aged 65); Seaham Hall, County Durham, England
- Spouse: Charles Vane, 3rd Marquess of Londonderry (m. 1819; died 1854)
- Issue: George Vane-Tempest, 5th Marquess of Londonderry; Frances Spencer-Churchill, Duchess of Marlborough; Alexandrina Dawson-Damer, Countess of Portarlington; Lord Adolphus Vane-Tempest; Lady Adelaide Emelina Caroline Vane; Lord Ernest McDonnell Vane-Tempest
- Father: Sir Henry Vane-Tempest, 2nd Bt
- Mother: Anne MacDonnell, Countess of Antrim

Frances Anne Vane, Marchioness of Londonderry (née Vane-Tempest; 17 January 1800 – 20 January 1865) was an Anglo-Irish heiress and noblewoman. She was the daughter of Sir Henry Vane-Tempest, 2nd Baronet, and married Charles Stewart, 1st Baron Stewart. She became a marchioness in 1822 when Charles succeeded his half-brother as Marquess of Londonderry.

== Life ==
Frances Anne was the only child of Sir Henry Vane-Tempest, 2nd Baronet, and his wife Anne MacDonnell, 2nd Countess of Antrim. At her father's death in 1813, Frances Anne inherited extensive lands in northeast England as well as some property in County Antrim, Ireland. As much of her English land was in the Durham Coalfield, she had income from coal mining. In his last will and testament, her father had stipulated that she must retain the surname Vane and that whoever married her would have to adopt her surname in lieu of his own.

In 1819 she married and became the second wife of Charles William Stewart, 1st Baron Stewart, who dutifully changed his name and became Charles William Vane. In 1822 she became a marchioness when her husband succeeded his half-brother Lord Castlereagh to become the 3rd Marquess of Londonderry. With her husband, she developed an extensive coal mining operation that included coal mines, a railway, and docks at Seaham.

She became an object of affection for Tsar Alexander I after he happened to see her engagement portrait by Sir Thomas Lawrence.

She sought to promote the political career of her eldest son, George Vane-Tempest, and was a patron of Benjamin Disraeli.

She built Garron Tower north of Carnlough, County Antrim, as a summer residence for herself.

When her husband died in 1854, she commissioned an equestrian statue showing him as a hussar, which was unveiled in 1861 and still stands on the market place in Durham, England. The sculptor was Raffaelle Monti.

Through her daughter, Lady Frances Vane, wife of John Churchill, 7th Duke of Marlborough, she is the great-grandmother of Winston Churchill.

== Issue ==
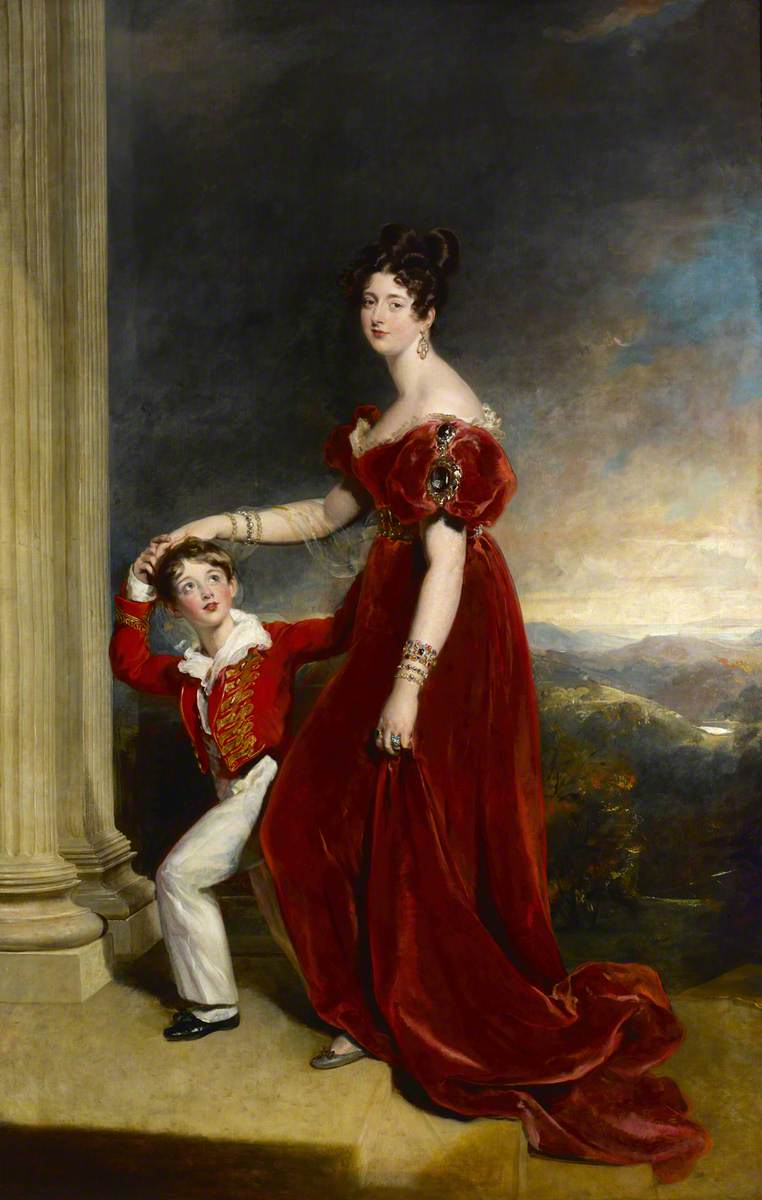
Frances Anne (1800–1865), Marchioness of Londonderry, and Her Son, George 1828 by Thomas Lawrence

- George Henry Robert Charles William Vane-Tempest, 5th Marquess of Londonderry (1821–1884)
- Lady Frances Anne Vane (1822–1899); married John Spencer-Churchill, 7th Duke of Marlborough.
- Lady Alexandrina Octavia Maria Vane (1823–1874), godchild of Alexander I of Russia; married Henry Dawson-Damer, 3rd Earl of Portarlington.
- Lord Adolphus Frederick Charles William Vane-Tempest (1825–1864), politician; became insane, and had to be medically restrained.
- Lady Adelaide Emelina Caroline Vane (c. 1830–1882); disgraced the family by eloping with her brother's tutor, Rev. Frederick Henry Law.
- Lord Ernest McDonnell Vane-Tempest (1836–1885), fell in with a press-gang and had to be bought a commission in the army, from which he was subsequently cashiered.

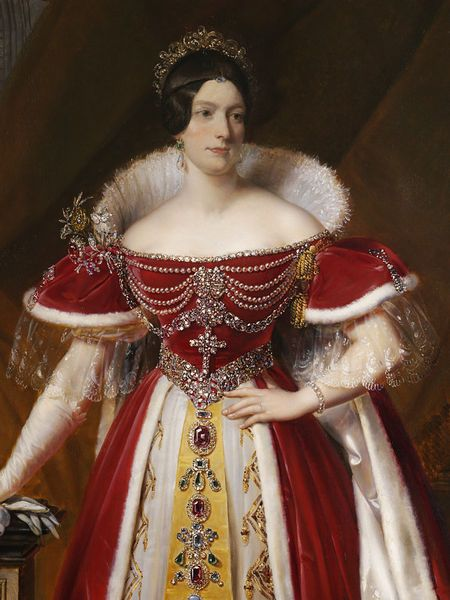
The Marchioness of Londonderry in 1831 at the coronation of King William IV. Portrait of the Marchioness of Londonderry by Alexandre-Jean Dubois-Drahonet

Portrait by Francis Grant, 1853

Frederick William Robert Stewart, 4th Marquess of Londonderry (1805–1872), was her stepson.

== Ancestry ==
Ancestors of Frances Vane, Marchioness of Londonderry

16. Lionel Vane
8. George Vane
17. Catherine Fletcher
4. Sir Henry Vane, 1st Baronet
18. William Machon
9. Anne Machon
2. Sir Henry Vane-Tempest, 2nd Baronet
20. John Tempest
10. John Tempest
21. Jane Wharton
5. Frances Tempest
22. Richard Shuttleworth
11. Frances Shuttleworth
1. Frances Vane-Tempest
24. Randal MacDonnell, 4th Earl of Antrim
12. Alexander MacDonnell, 5th Earl of Antrim
25. Hon. Rachael Skeffington
6. Randal MacDonnell, 1st Marquess of Antrim
26. Charles Plunkett
13. Anne Plunkett
27. Elizabeth Stratford
3. Anne MacDonnell, 2nd Countess of Antrim
28. Francis Morris of Castle Morres
14. Hervey Morres, 1st Viscount Mountmorres
29. Catherine Evans
7. The Hon. Letitia Morres
30. Brabazon Ponsonby, 1st Earl of Bessborough
15. Lady Letitia Ponsonby
31. Sarah Margetson
