= Light of Other Days =

1966 science fiction short story by Bob Shaw

- Short story by Bob Shaw
- Country: United Kingdom
- Genre: Science fiction

Publication
- Published in: Analog Science Fiction and Fact
- Publication type: Science fiction magazine
- Publisher: Condé Nast Publications
- Publication date: August 1966

"Light of Other Days" is a science fiction short story by Bob Shaw. It was originally published in August 1966 in Analog Science Fiction and Fact. The story uses the idea of "slow glass": glass through which light takes years to pass. Bob Shaw used this idea again in later stories.

The story's title is derived from Thomas Moore's poem "Oft, in the Stilly Night", which is quoted within the story.

== Plot summary ==
The narrator is touring northwest Scotland with his wife Selina. Their relationship is in trouble, and news of her pregnancy has made it worse. Their holiday, intended to improve the situation, has not been a success. Travelling through a remote area, they find a place that sells panes of slow glass. This is glass that light takes a long time to pass through, even years, so that a pane of this glass shows a scene from the past. People buy slow glass that has been placed in picturesque scenery so that later they can enjoy the view in their homes or workplaces. The best quality slow glass is priced by its "thickness", corresponding to the number of years of scenic view contained within it. The narrator thinks that an extravagant act like buying slow glass might set right his relationship with Selina.

Leaving the car, they walk along a path, where they see panes of slow glass facing a view of a loch. They meet Mr Hagan, who is sitting on a low wall in front of his stone farmhouse and looking toward the house. Inside, through the window, they see a young woman, presumably Mrs Hagan, and a small boy. Hagan fetches a rug from the house so that Selina can sit on the wall. The narrator, sensing that Mrs Hagan, looking toward them from inside, is not aware of them, wonders whether she is blind; Selina remarks that her dress is out of fashion.

The narrator discusses with Hagan the price of his slow glass. Hagan says how fine the view is from there; as he talks, the narrator, still looking at the house, wonders if the small boy is blind as well. Eventually, although Selina is not impressed, the narrator decides to buy. While Hagan is fetching the glass, rain begins, so Selina goes to the house to return the rug. When she opens the door, she sees that the interior is disordered and squalid; Hagan is living alone. The family scene of wife and child was of years ago, seen through slow glass. (Slow glass works both ways.) As the couple leaves with their purchase, Hagan sorrowfully tells them his wife and child were killed in a road accident six years previously.

The narrator, walking with his wife back along the path, feels their relationship is somehow strengthened. He looks back at Hagan, who is sitting at his usual place, looking toward the house.

== Reception ==
"Light of Other Days" was shortlisted for the Nebula Award for Best Short Story in 1966, and for the 1967 Hugo Award for Best Short Story.

Calling the story a classic, Algis Budrys said that it "tends to make people weep". Robert Silverberg praised it as a nigh on perfect short story that used "technological speculation to illuminate human themes and human themes to illuminate scientific speculations". Chinese science fiction novelist Wang Jinkang affirmed the science fictional conceit of the story, saying that this premise makes it easier for the protagonist's profound pain to be expressed to the fullest.
