= Orbitsville Departure =

Orbitsville Departure is a novel by Bob Shaw published in 1983. It is a sequel to his 1975 novel Orbitsville.

== Plot summary ==
The following is a blurb from the 1991 paperback edition from Orbit Books

Two hundred years ago mankind found Orbitsville, a vast sphere whose habitable inner surface comprised living space equivalent to five billion Earths. The resulting migration was enthusiastic - and nearly total. Earth itself is a backwater now, a place with which the people of Orbitsville maintain only marginal contact. But just because it's backward doesn't mean it isn't dangerous.

== Reception ==
Dave Pringle reviewed Orbitsville Departure for Imagine magazine, and stated that "It does not hold up as well as the earlier book, suffering from a rather rushed denouement which ought to have boggled the mind but for some reason did not. Nevertheless Shaw is the most readable of writers and like all his books this one entertains."

== Reviews ==
- Review by Paul Kincaid (1983) in Vector 117
- Review by Richard E. Geis (1985) in Science Fiction Review, Summer 1985
- Review by Gene DeWeese (1985) in Science Fiction Review, Fall 1985
- Review by Don D'Ammassa (1985) in Science Fiction Chronicle, #75 December 1985
- Review by Chris Amies (1991) in Vector 164
