= Land and Overland =

Science fantasy novels

The Land and Overland trilogy is a group of three science fantasy novels by Northern Irish writer Bob Shaw.

The trilogy consists of the books The Ragged Astronauts (published in 1986), The Wooden Spaceships (1988) and The Fugitive Worlds (1989). In the United Kingdom, all three novels were originally published by Victor Gollancz. The Ragged Astronauts won the BSFA Award for best Novel in 1987.

The setting for the trilogy is a pair of planets, Land and Overland, which orbit about a common centre of gravity, close enough to each other that they share a common atmosphere.

== Plot ==
=== The Ragged Astronauts ===
Land is a strictly feudal society that undergoes a peak energy crisis (the trees that provide energy and hard materials are scarce), and is undergoing a process of cultural decay. Much of the human population of Land travels to Overland via hot-air balloon to escape airborne creatures called the Ptertha.

==== Translations ====
- Russian: "Астронавты в лохмотьях" ("Astronauts in Rags"), 2003
- German: "Die Heißluft-Astronauten", 1991 (ISBN 3-453-04484-3)
- Czech: "Primitivní Astronauti", 1993
- Polish: "Kosmiczna przeprowadzka" ("Space removal"), 1994 (ISBN 83-7082-624-5)
- Italian: "L'invasione dei Ptertha: (Sfida al cielo)" ("The Ptertha invasion, or Challenge to the sky"), 1999 (ISBN 88-4291-093-7)
- Romanian: "Astronauții zdrențăroși"

=== The Wooden Spaceships ===
Conflict breaks out between the new inhabitants of Overland and those who stayed behind on Land and, having developed an immunity to the Ptertha, intend to invade Overland. The inhabitants of Overland manage to defeat them by erecting a network of fortresses between the two planets. The spaceships of the title are made of a super-hard wood, brakka.

==== Translations ====
- Russian: "Деревянные космолёты" ("The Wooden Spaceships"), 2003
- German: "Die hölzernen Raumschiffe", 1991 (ISBN 3-453-04485-1)
- Czech: "Dřevěné kosmické lodě", 1996
- Italian: "L'attacco di mondo" ("The attack to the world"), 2000 (ISBN 8842911275)
- Romanian: N/A

=== The Fugitive Worlds ===
A strange object begins to approach the planets from outer space.

==== Translations ====
- Russian: "Беглые планеты" ("The Fugitive Planets"), 2003
- German: "Die flüchtigen Welten", 1991 (ISBN 3-453-04486-X)
- Italian: "Verso l'ignoto" ("Towards the Unknown"), 2000 (ISBN 8842911364)

== Reception ==
Orson Scott Card reviewed the first volume favourably, saying "The Ragged Astronauts is what an 18th-century hard-sf novel might have been, if Swift or Defoe had paid more attention to Newton. There are marvels enough to make you feel like you're discovering science fiction for the first time. . . . Shaw writes with an extraordinary combination of intelligence, clarity, and compassion."
