= Tomorrow Lies in Ambush =

1973 short story collection by Bob Shaw

First edition, published by Ace Books. Cover art by Josh Kirby.

Tomorrow Lies in Ambush (ISBN 0-330-24443-4) is a collection of science fiction short stories by Bob Shaw, published in 1973. It contains :

- "Call me Dumbo"
- "Stormseeker"
- "Repeat Performance"
- "... And Isles where Good Men Lie"
- "What Time do you Call This?"
- "Communication"
- "The Cosmic Cocktail Party"
- "The Happiest Day of Your Life"
- "The Weapons of Isher II"
- "Pilot Plant"
- "Telemart Three"
- "Invasion of Privacy"
