= A Better Mantrap =

1982 book by Bob Shaw

- Publisher: Victor Gollancz Ltd
- Publication date: 1982.
- Pages: 192
- ISBN: 9780575030831
- OCLC: 11065828

A Better Mantrap (ISBN 0-586-05706-4) is a collection of science fiction short stories by British writer Bob Shaw, published in 1982. The book is Shaw's eighteenth overall and his third collection of short stories. Critic David Langford described the book as "good and entertaining", but lightweight in comparison to Shaw's novels.

== Content ==
It includes:

- "Conversion"
- "Crossing the Line"
- "Small World"
- "The Kingdom of O'Ryan"
- "Dream Fighter"
- "The Cottage of Eternity"
- "In the Hereafter Hilton"
- "Amphitheatre"
- "Frost Animals"
