= Alexandre-Jean Dubois-Drahonet =

French painter

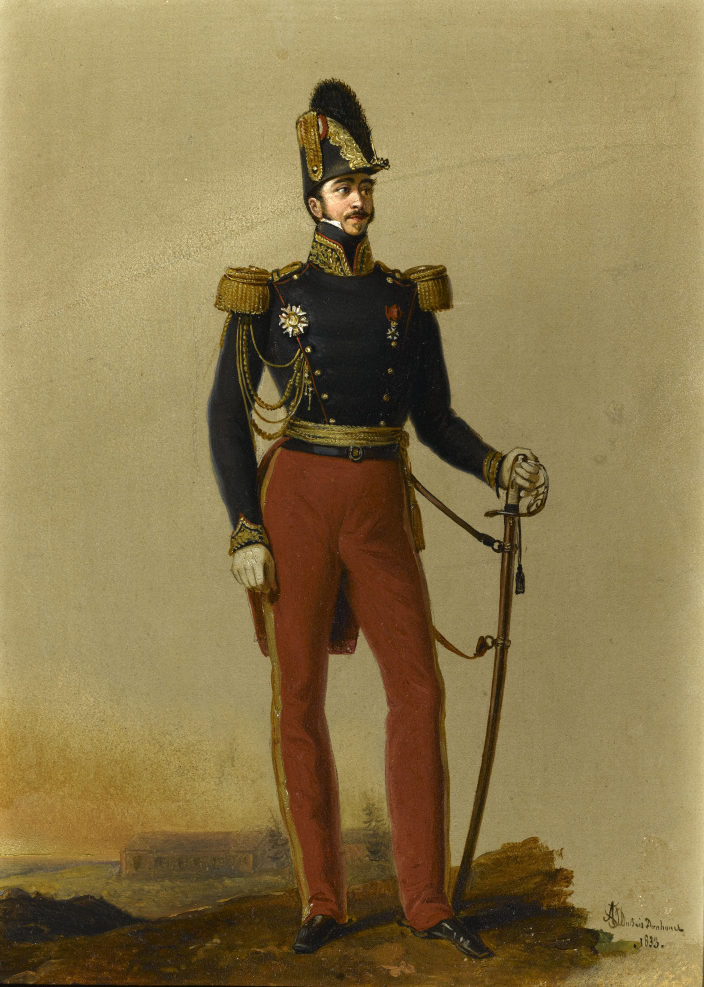
General-duke Gaspard Gourgaud, now in the Napoleon Museum of Île-d'Aix

Alexandre-Jean Dubois-Drahonet (23 December 1790 – 30 August 1834) was a French painter who specialised in military art.

== Biography ==
Alexandre-Jean Dubois was the son of Claude Jacques Dubois and Angélique Victoire Gallet.

He married Élisabeth Cornelia Drahonet, daughter of the painter Pierre Drahonet (1761-1817).

He executed a great number of sketches of various national and military costumes, some of which are at Windsor. In 1828 King William IV of Great Britain commissioned a set of 100 small paintings in "oil on card", measuring 34.9 x 25.5 x 0.2 cm, illustrating the various uniforms of the British military. Most of these remain in the Royal Collection. Framed groups of them can be seen in a photograph of the Equerry's Room in Windsor Castle of around 1900. A range of ranks are shown, and the models all named; whether they were all as tall and slim as he shows them might be doubted.

He also produced a number of portraits of young boys in military uniform, including one of the Duke of Bordeaux in the Bordeaux Museum.

He died at his home in Versailles on August 30, 1834.

== Gallery ==
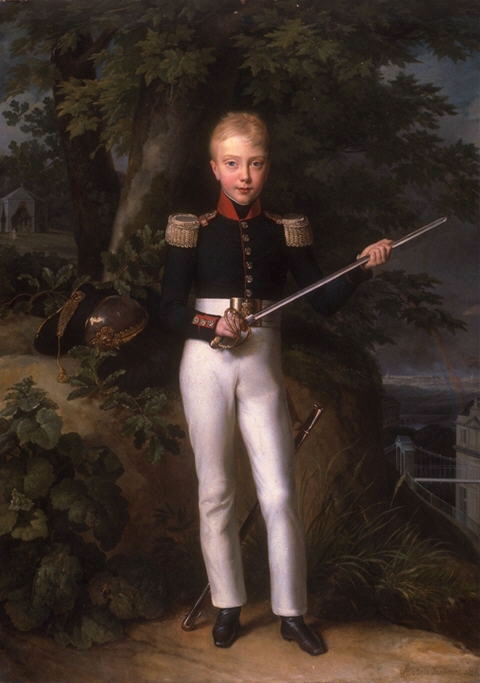
The young Duke of Bordeaux in a military uniform, 1828

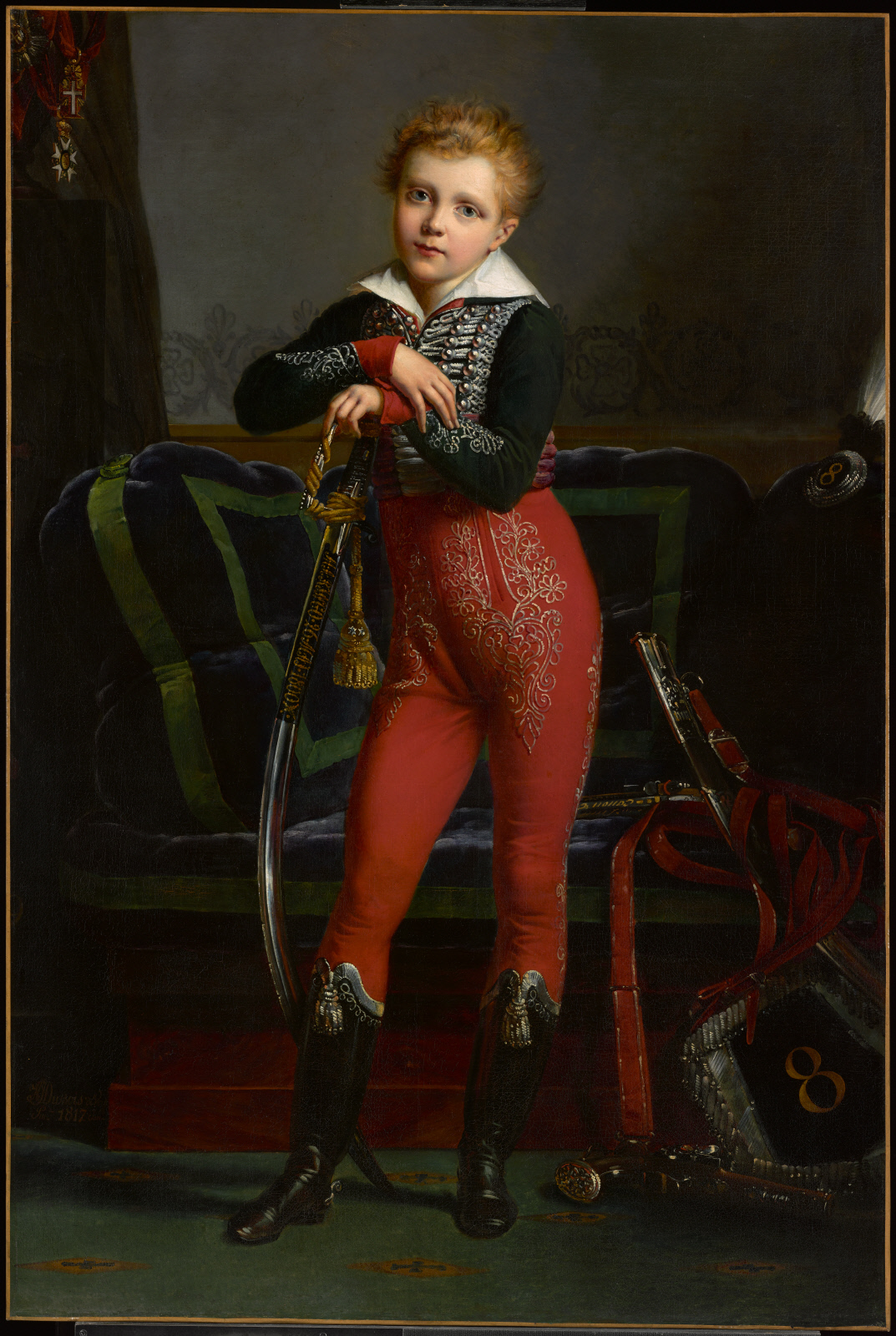
Portrait of Achille Deban de Laborde, 1817, Clark Art Institute, Williamstown

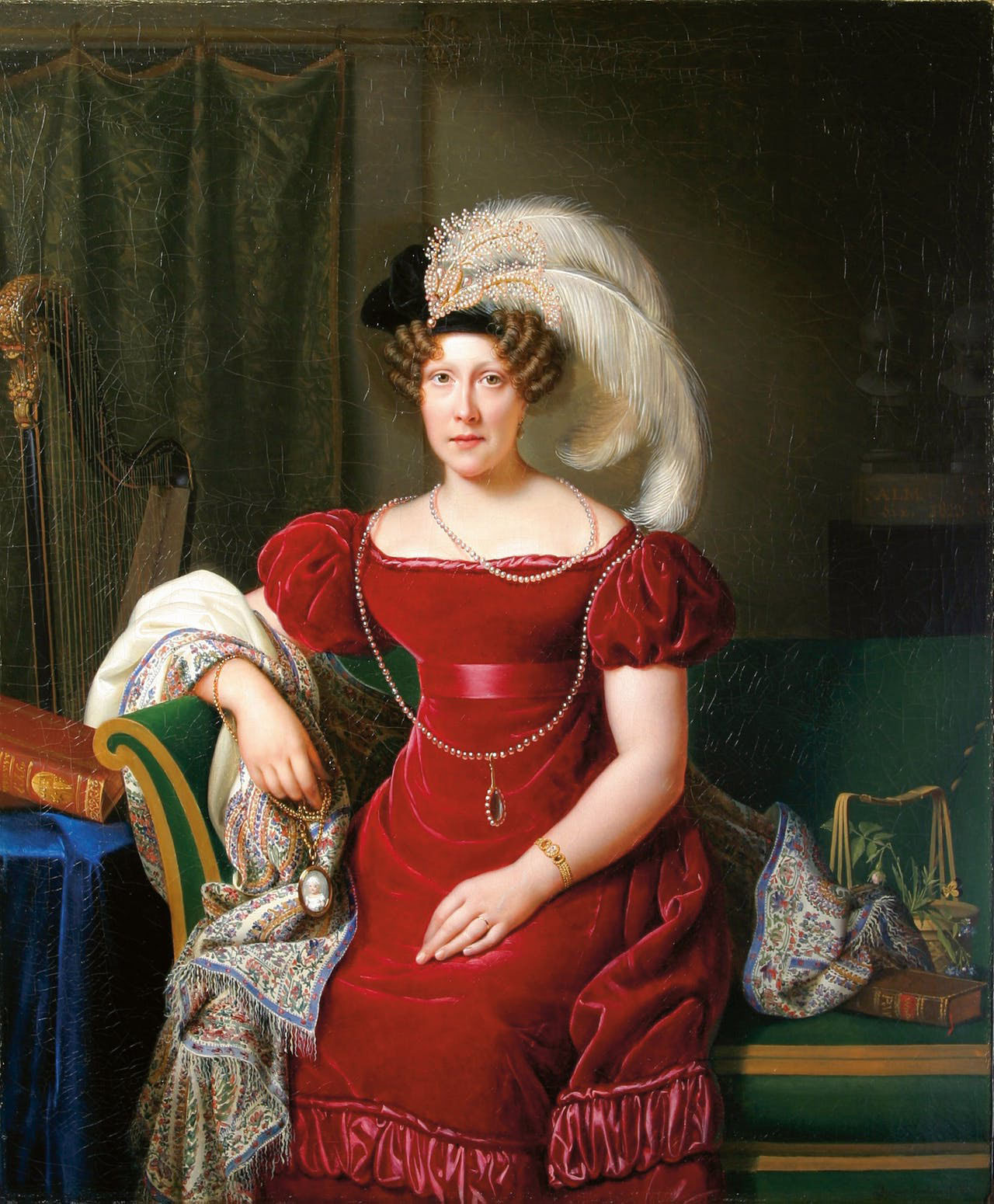
Lucretia Johanna van Winter, 1825

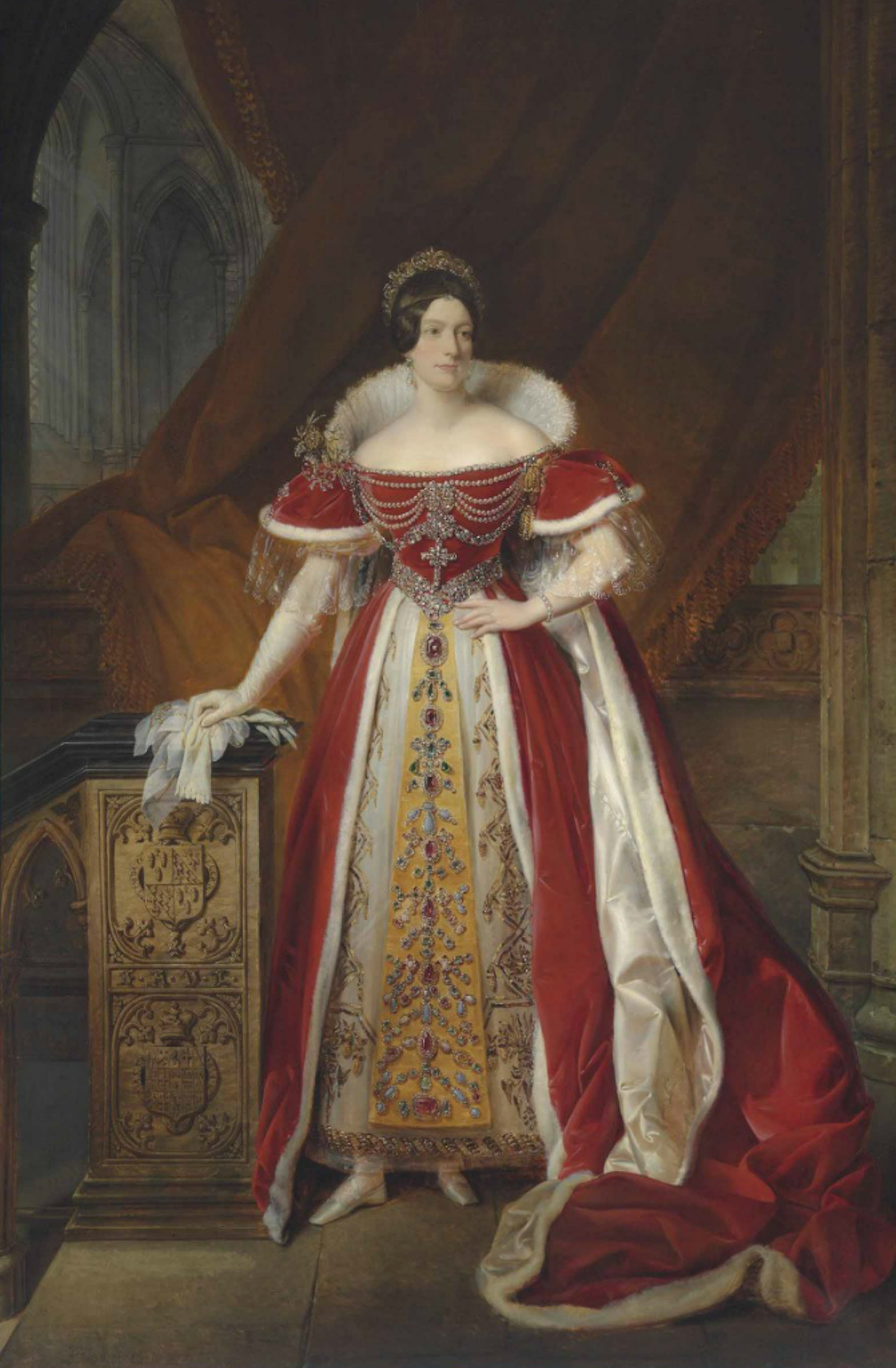
Portrait of the Marchioness of Londonderry, 1831

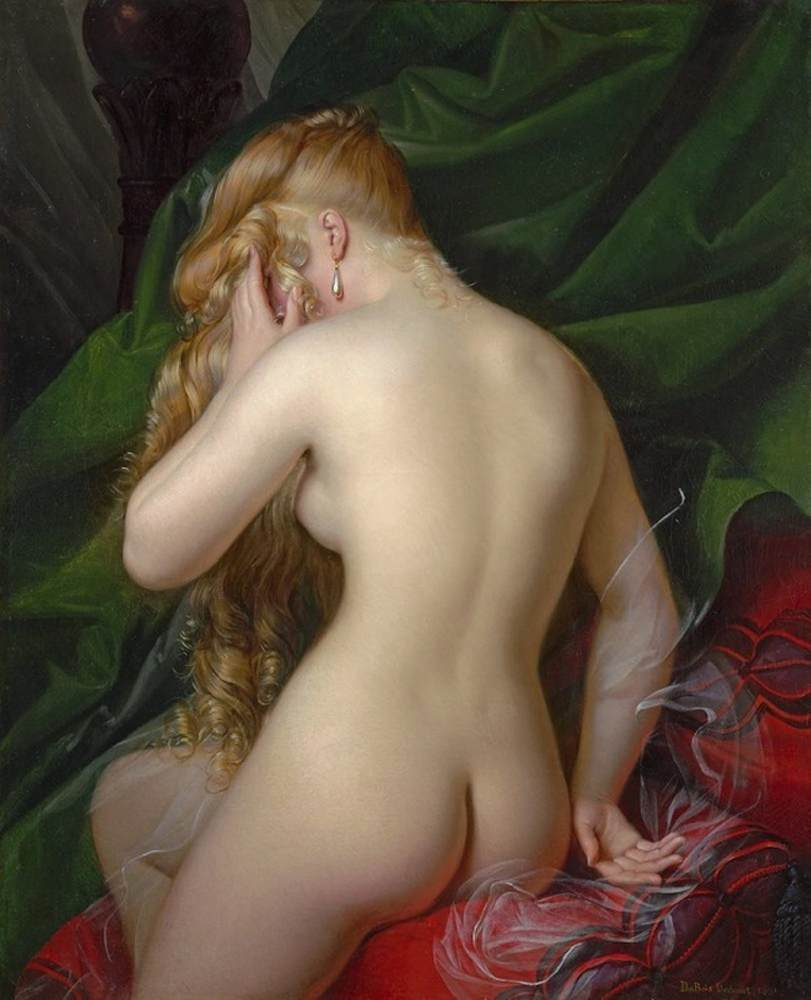
Female Nude, private collection, 1831

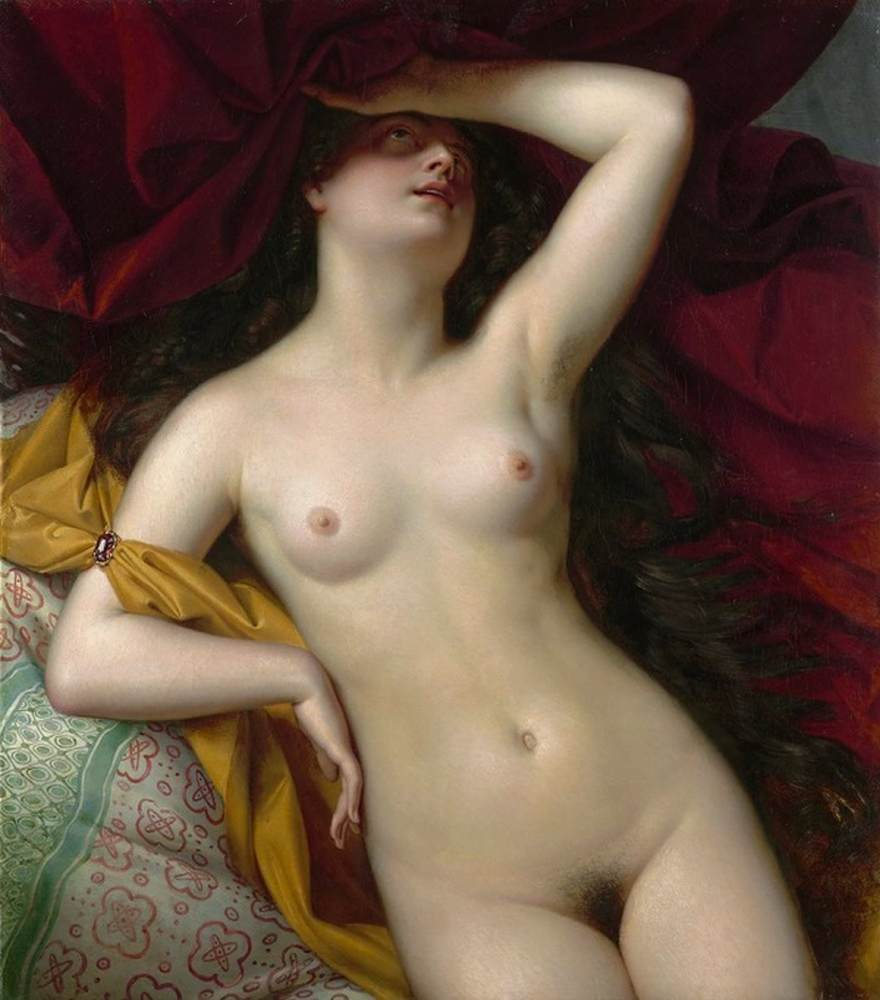
Female Nude, private collection, 1831

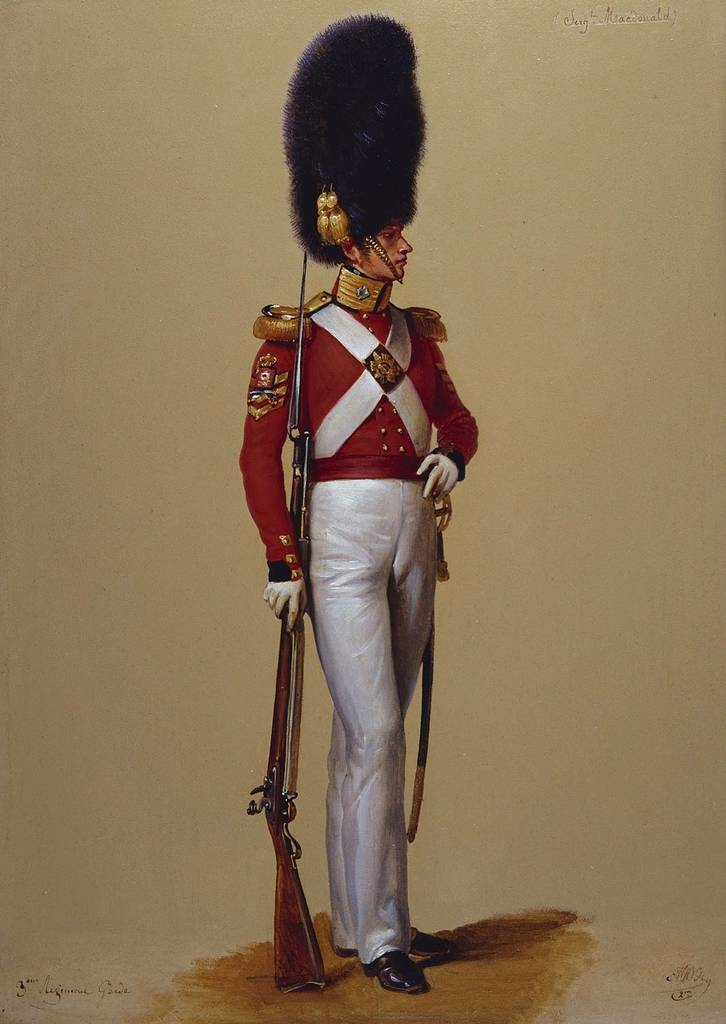
Colour-Sergeant Alexander McDonald, Scots Fusilier Guards, Royal Collection

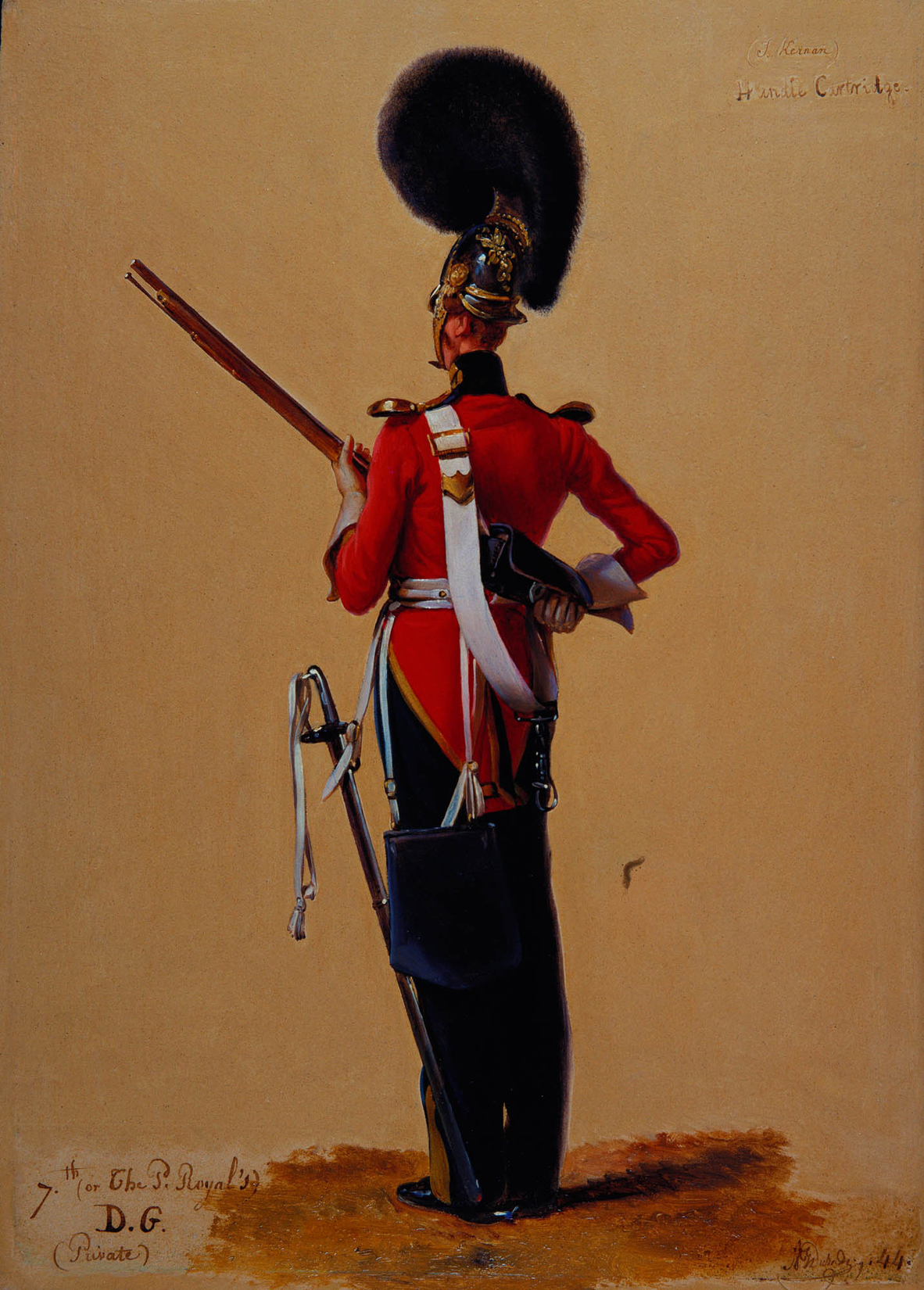
Private John Kernan (b. 1806), 7th Dragoon Guards

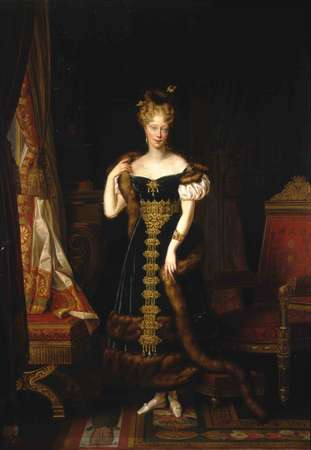
Portrait en pied de S. A. R. Madame, duchesse de Berry , 1828, huile sur toile, Amiens, Musée de Picardie

== Exhibitions ==
- Alexandre-Jean Dubois-Drahonet, un talent retrouvé, Versailles, Musée Lambinet, from 25 November 2023 to 25 February 2024.
