= Bligh =

Bligh may refer to:

== Surname ==
- Anna Bligh (born 1960), Australian politician
- Beatrice Bligh (1916–1973), Australian gardener
- George Miller Bligh (1780–1834), British naval officer, son of Richard Rodney Bligh
- Jasmine Bligh (1913–1991), British television presenter
- Richard Bligh (1780–1838), British barrister
- Richard Rodney Bligh (1737–1821), British naval officer
- Thomas Bligh (1685–1775), British army general
- Thomas Bligh (1654–1710), (1654–1710) Irish politician
- William Bligh (1754–1817), British naval officer whose command of HMS Bounty was challenged by 1789 mutiny

Members of the family of the Earl of Darnley, an English aristocratic family associated with cricket in Kent:

- John Bligh, 1st Earl of Darnley (1687–1728), son of Thomas Bligh (1654–1710)
- Edward Bligh, 2nd Earl of Darnley (1715–1747), peer
- John Bligh, 3rd Earl of Darnley (1719–1781), parliamentarian
- John Bligh, 4th Earl of Darnley (1767–1831), peer and cricketer
- General Edward Bligh (1769–1840), soldier, politician and cricketer
- Edward Bligh, 5th Earl of Darnley (1795–1835), peer and member of the House of Commons
- John Duncan Bligh (1798–1832), diplomat
- Edward Bligh (cricketer, died 1872) (c.1800–1872), cricketer
- Edward Vesey Bligh (1829–1908), cricketer, diplomat and clergyman
- Henry Bligh (1834–1905), clergyman and cricketer
- Edward Bligh, 7th Earl of Darnley (1851–1900)
- Lodovick Bligh (1854–1884), cricketer
- Ivo Bligh, 8th Earl of Darnley (1859–1927), cricketer who captained the England cricket team in 1882/3 in Australia
- Algernon Bligh (1888–1952), English cricketer

== Given name ==
- Bligh Madris, (born 1996), American baseball player

== Other ==
- HMS Bligh (K-467) a Buckley class destroyer escort, named after William Bligh
- Bligh Water, a shallow marine area (approximately 9500 km^{2} in extent) in western Fiji, named after William Bligh
- Bligh Reef, a reef in Prince William Sound, Alaska, named after William Bligh
- Bligh Island Marine Provincial Park is a provincial park in British Columbia, Canada, named after William Bligh
- Bligh Cap, former name of Rendez-Vous Islet ((in French) Îlot du Rendez-Vous), an islet in the North-West of the Kerguelen Islands
- Electoral district of Bligh, an electoral district of the Legislative Assembly in the Australian state of New South Wales
- Bligh Park, New South Wales, a suburb of Sydney, in the state of New South Wales, Australia
- Bligh Roosters, a rugby union franchise based in Tavua
- Bligh (TV series), an Australian sitcom starring members of the cast of Fast Forward

== See also ==
- Bly (disambiguation)
- Blythe (disambiguation)
