= Thomas Cherburgh Bligh =

Anglo-Irish Whig politician

Member of Parliament (United Kingdom) for County Meath
- In office 1802–1812 Serving with Sir Marcus Somerville, Bt
- Preceded by: Hamilton Gorges; Sir Marcus Somerville, Bt
- Succeeded by: Thomas Taylour, Earl of Bective; Sir Marcus Somerville, Bt

Member of Parliament (Ireland) for Athboy
- In office 1783–1801 Serving with Hugh Howard; Hon. Edward Bligh
- Preceded by: William Chapman; Edward Tighe
- Succeeded by: Constituency disenfranchised

Personal details
- Born: c. 1761
- Died: 17 September 1830 (aged 68–69) King's Bench Prison
- Party: Whig
- Spouse: Lady Theodosia Bligh (m. 1790)
- Relations: Thomas Bligh (grandfather); John Bligh, 1st Earl of Darnley (uncle); Thomas Bligh (uncle)
- Children: 6, including Edward
- Parents: Robert Bligh; Frances Winthrop
- Education: St John's College, Cambridge

Thomas Cherburgh Bligh (c. 1761 – 17 September 1830) was an Anglo-Irish Whig politician who served in the Irish House of Commons and the Parliament of the United Kingdom.

== Early life ==
He was the eldest son of the Very Rev. Robert Bligh, Dean of Elphin, and the former Frances Winthrop. Before his parents married, his father was married to Catherine Elliott, the daughter of Maj.-Gen. Roger Elliott and sister to Maj.-Gen. Granville Elliott. One of his sisters, Frances Theodosia Bligh, was married to Robert Jocelyn, 2nd Earl of Roden, and another, Catherine Maria Bligh, was married to Hon. Hugh Howard (a son of Ralph Howard, 1st Viscount Wicklow).

His paternal grandfather was the politician Thomas Bligh, who was appointed to the Privy Council of Ireland. Bligh's uncles were John Bligh, 1st Earl of Darnley and Lt.-Gen. Thomas Bligh, best known for his service during the Seven Years' War. Both of his uncles served in the Irish House of Commons.

Bligh was educated at Armagh and at St John's College, Cambridge.

== Career ==
Upon his father's death in 1778, he inherited his estate. Bligh was returned to the Irish parliament for Athboy in 1783 on the interest of his kinsman and, later, brother-in-law, John Bligh, 4th Earl of Darnley. When he attended, he was in opposition; neither he nor Lord Darnley voted on the Acts of Union. Lord Darnley promoted his candidature for County Meath in the summer of 1801 and he was returned as one of two Members of Parliament to the House of Commons of the United Kingdom in the following year after an easy contest. Bligh was recorded as voting with the minority for the 1803 inquiry into the Prince of Wales's finances, and, acting with Lord Darnley, several times against Henry Addington on defense in 1804. On William Pitt's return to power, he was listed 'Prince'. In December 1804 and July 1805, he was listed as in opposition and he voted in the minority against the war with Spain in February 1805, and in the majorities against Melville. In May 1806, the Chief Secretary reported that Bligh wanted an office for himself, or his son, in return for which he would support and be supported by government. In 1807, Bligh voted with them after their dismissal. On 27 April 1807 Bligh informed Viscount Castlereagh, who at once reported to the Viceroy, that:

"he has hitherto voted against in concurrence with Lord Darnley, but his lordship being less hostile than he was, has liberated him from his allegiance, and he has desired me to convey to you his disposition to give his support to your government, and the administration generally. I find however that he looks to have his claims considered, when it can be done without embarrassment, and as he has a family and is exposed to expense in maintaining his interest in the county, looks at some future, but as early an opportunity as may be practicable, to office for himself, or some provision for one of his sons."

Bligh went to Ireland but on making his "liberal" intentions known in Meath, as he was instructed by Viscount Castlereagh, he ran into difficulties. Lord Fingall, a champion of the cause of Catholic Emancipation, refused to support a candidate who would not oppose the Portland ministry. Afraid of the expense of a contest and convinced he would lose, the chief secretary urged Bligh to either stand "as a friend of government or to decline with a public declaration that he refused to be 'the tool of Lord Fingall'". The pro-Catholic Bligh, instead withdraw his offer of allegiance to ministers and tried to wriggle out of any pledges on the campaign trail. In 1808, it was reported in Parliament that Bligh "supports generally and votes with opposition with reluctance" although he did not vote with opposition except on Catholic relief in May 1808.

Lord Darnley, however, remained in opposition and in early in 1810, he reported that Bligh "lately resumed his political connection with me, and I have every reason to believe that it will not again be interrupted." Indeed, Bligh voted against government on the Scheldt inquiry in March 1810, voted for Catholic relief in June 1810 and sided with them in the Regency divisions from 1810 to 1811. Bligh voted for the Catholic claims in May 1811 and April 1812 and for Viscount Morpeth's motion critical of the state of Ireland in February 1812. Bligh did not seek re-election in 1812 as his relationship with Lord Darnley had again deteriorated. Bligh "tried to call out Darnley in 1806 and again did so in 1812, when as before, he was tried in King’s bench and bound over to keep the peace. By 1820, he was again harassing Darnley and was bound over for another four years, but, unable to pay the sureties required for his discharge, spent the rest of his life in King's Bench prison."

== Personal life ==
On 3 November 1790, he was married to Lady Theodosia Bligh (1771–1840), daughter of John Bligh, 3rd Earl of Darnley and the former Mary Stoyte. Her sister, Lady Catherine, was married to Charles Vane, 3rd Marquess of Londonderry. Her eldest brother John was the fourth Earl of Darnley. Another brother was Gen. Edward Bligh and her youngest brother, Col. Hon. William Bligh, was married to Lady Sophia Stewart (a daughter of John Stewart, 7th Earl of Galloway). Together, they were the parents of:

- Thomas Bligh (d. c. 1828), a captain in the Coldstream Guards who married Helena Paterson, daughter of Col. Thomas Paterson. After his death, she married William Pole-Tylney-Long-Wellesley, 4th Earl of Mornington.
- Frances "Fanny" Bligh (d. 1834), who married George Vicesimus Wigram, son of Sir Robert Wigram, 1st Baronet, in 1830.
- Sarah Bligh, who died unmarried.
- Elizabeth Bligh, who married, firstly, John Cuming in 1828, they had one daughter. She married, secondly, John Fountain Elwin, in 1838.
- Edward Bligh (1797–1872), a Deputy Lieutenant and Justice of the Peace who married Sophia Eversfield, daughter of William Eversfield of Denne Park, in 1827.
- Charles Bligh (1808–1892), who married Fanny Catherine Parker, daughter of Sir William Parker, 2nd Baronet, in 1837.

Bligh died at King's Bench Prison in Southwark, London on 17 September 1830. His widow, Lady Theodosia, died nearly ten years later on 21 January 1840.

Parliament of Ireland
| Preceded by William Chapman; Edward Tighe | Member of Parliament for Athboy; 1783–1801; With: Hugh Howard; Hon. Edward Bligh | Succeeded by Constituency disenfranchised |
Parliament of the United Kingdom
| Preceded by Hamilton Gorges; Sir Marcus Somerville, Bt | Member of Parliament for County Meath; 1802–1812; With: Sir Marcus Somerville, Bt | Succeeded by Thomas Taylour, Earl of Bective; Sir Marcus Somerville, Bt |
