= Edward Bligh (British Army officer) =

Irish politician and cricketer

General The Honourable Edward Bligh

Member of the Ireland Parliament for Athboy
- In office 1800–1801 Serving with Thomas Cherburgh Bligh
- Preceded by: Hugh Howard; Thomas Cherburgh Bligh

Personal details
- Born: 19 September 1767 County Meath, Ireland
- Died: 12 November 1840 (aged 73) Thames Ditton, England
- Nickname: Skirmish Bligh

Military service
- Allegiance: United Kingdom
- Branch/service: British Army
- Years of service: 1787–1840
- Rank: General
- Commands: 85th Regiment of Foot; 2/5th Regiment of Foot
- Battles/wars: French Revolutionary Wars; Flanders campaign; Napoleonic Wars

General Edward Bligh (19 September 1769 – 2 November 1840), was a British Army officer, a member of the Irish House of Commons, a noted amateur cricketer, and a prominent early member of Marylebone Cricket Club. He was a member of the Darnley noble family.

== Early life ==
Bligh was born in 1769 in County Meath in the Kingdom of Ireland, (Note: The Kingdom of Ireland was a British controlled client state which existed between 1542 and the Act of Union, 1800 which established the United Kingdom of Great Britain and Ireland from 1801.) the second son of John Bligh, 3rd Earl of Darnley and his wife Lady Mary (née Stoyte). His mother was a "wealthy heiress" and the only child of a leading Irish barrister, John Stoyte from Streete, County Westmeath. John Bligh, who was 47 years old, married the 18 year old Stoyte in 1767 in Dublin. The Earls of Darnley owned Clifton Lodge in County Meath and much of the area around Athboy in the county, as well as Cobham Hall in Kent, England, and Edward Bligh grew up at both properties. He was educated at Eton College.

== Army career ==
After leaving Eton, Bligh entered the British Army, initially being commissioned into the Coldstream Guards as an ensign in 1787. He was promoted to major, serving in the 3rd Foot Guards, in 1792 and, after serving in the 1793 Flanders campaign during the early years of the French Revolutionary Wars held the rank of lieutenant-colonel in the 85th Regiment of Foot by 1794 and brevet colonel by 1798, when he served as aide-de-camp to George III whilst serving in the 107th Regiment of Foot. He commanded the 2nd battalion of the 5th Regiment of Foot between 1799 and 1803 and late commanded the 33rd Regiment of Foot. In 1805, Bligh was promoted to major-general at the age of 32. Bligh was promoted to lieutenant-general in 1811.

== Cricket ==
Primarily a batsman, Bligh played in at least 120 matches in a career known to span the 1789 to 1813 seasons. He was a prominent member of Marylebone Cricket Club (MCC), and played in many matches for the club and its affiliated teams. He also played for England (i.e., the "rest" of England), and for Kent. In addition, he organised his own team, E. Bligh's XI.

Bligh and his brother John opened the batting for Kent against Hampshire in 1790, and both played regularly in top-class matches. Arthur Haygarth described Edward Bligh as "one of the best gentlemen bats of his day". In lower-level cricket, he scored two centuries, both for MCC, making 132 against the Bullingdon Club at Oxford in 1796, and 105 against Middlesex at Lord's Old Ground in 1797. (Note: Bligh played at a time when high scoring innings were rare, and his two centuries are a notable achievement for an amateur.) In 1806, he played for the Gentlemen in the first two Gentlemen v Players matches.

== Family and later life ==
Bligh represented Athboy in the Irish House of Commons in 1800. The constituency was disfranchised at the end of the year as a result of the Acts of Union 1800 at which the Irish House of Commons was combined with that of Great Britain to form the Parliament of the United Kingdom of Great Britain and Ireland. His great-grandfather Thomas Bligh, grandfather John Bligh, 1st Earl of Darnley and father all held the seat, the family owning the land around the town. His great-uncle, also Thomas Bligh, held the seat between 1761 and 1775 and his second cousin Thomas Cherburgh Bligh held it between 1783 and 1800, serving alongside Bligh in the final parliament. (Note: Thomas Cherburgh Bligh went on to represent County Meath in the Parliament of the United Kingdom of Great Britain and Ireland between 1802 and 1815.) He served alongside his nephew Edward Bligh, 5th Earl of Darnley as one of the Governors of Meath in 1831.

The younger brother of John Bligh, 4th Earl of Darnley (1767–1831), who also played cricket for Kent, Bligh did not marry. His nephew John Duncan Bligh played one first-class cricket match for MCC in 1822, and his great-nephews Edward Vesey Bligh, John Bligh, 6th Earl of Darnley and Henry Bligh all played for the Gentlemen of Kent, with Edward and Henry both also playing for Kent County Cricket Club. More distant relations to have played for Kent were Lodovick Bligh and Ivo Bligh, 8th Earl of Darnley who captained the English cricket team in Australia in 1882–83 and was presented with the original Ashes urn. Another member of the family, Algernon Bligh, played first-class cricket for Somerset County Cricket Club.

Bligh died at Thames Ditton in Surrey in 1840. He was 71.

== Bibliography ==
- Carlaw, Derek (2020). Kent County Cricketers, A to Z: Part One (1806–1914) (PDF). Cardiff: ACS.
- Haygarth, Arthur (1996) [1862]. Scores & Biographies, Volume 1 (1744–1826). Kennington: Frederick Lillywhite. ISBN 978-19-00592-23-9.
- Moore, Dudley (1998). The History of Kent County Cricket Club. London: Christopher Helm. ISBN 978-07-47022-09-1.

Parliament of Ireland
Preceded by Hugh Howard; Thomas Cherburgh Bligh	Member of Parliament for Athboy; 1800 – 1801; Served alongside: Thomas Cherburgh Bligh	Succeeded by Parliament of the United Kingdom
