= Darnley Mausoleum =

Coordinates: 51°23′21″N 0°26′02″E

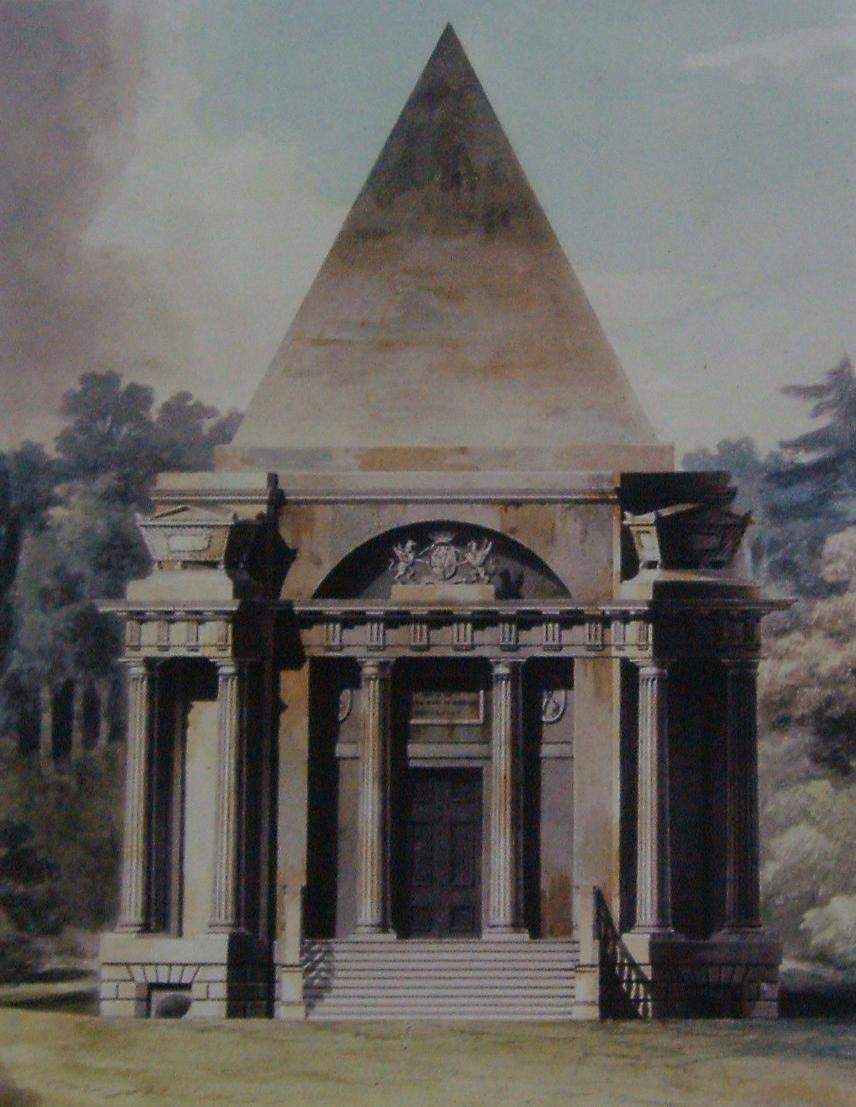
- Interactive map of the Darnley Mausoleum area

General information
- Type: Mausoleum
- Architectural style: Grand classical temple, using Roman Doric order,
- Location: Cobham Woods, Kent
- Construction started: 1786
- Completed: 1808
- Renovated: 2013
- Client: 4th Earl of Darnley of Cobham Hall
- Owner: National Trust

Technical details
- Material: Portland stone

Design and construction
- Architect: James Wyatt
- Designations: Grade I listed

Renovating team
- Architect: James Wraight
- Renovating firm: Purcell Miller Tritton
- Awards and prizes: 2010 Kent Design Award in the Conservation & Craftsmanship Category and also the Project of the Year award

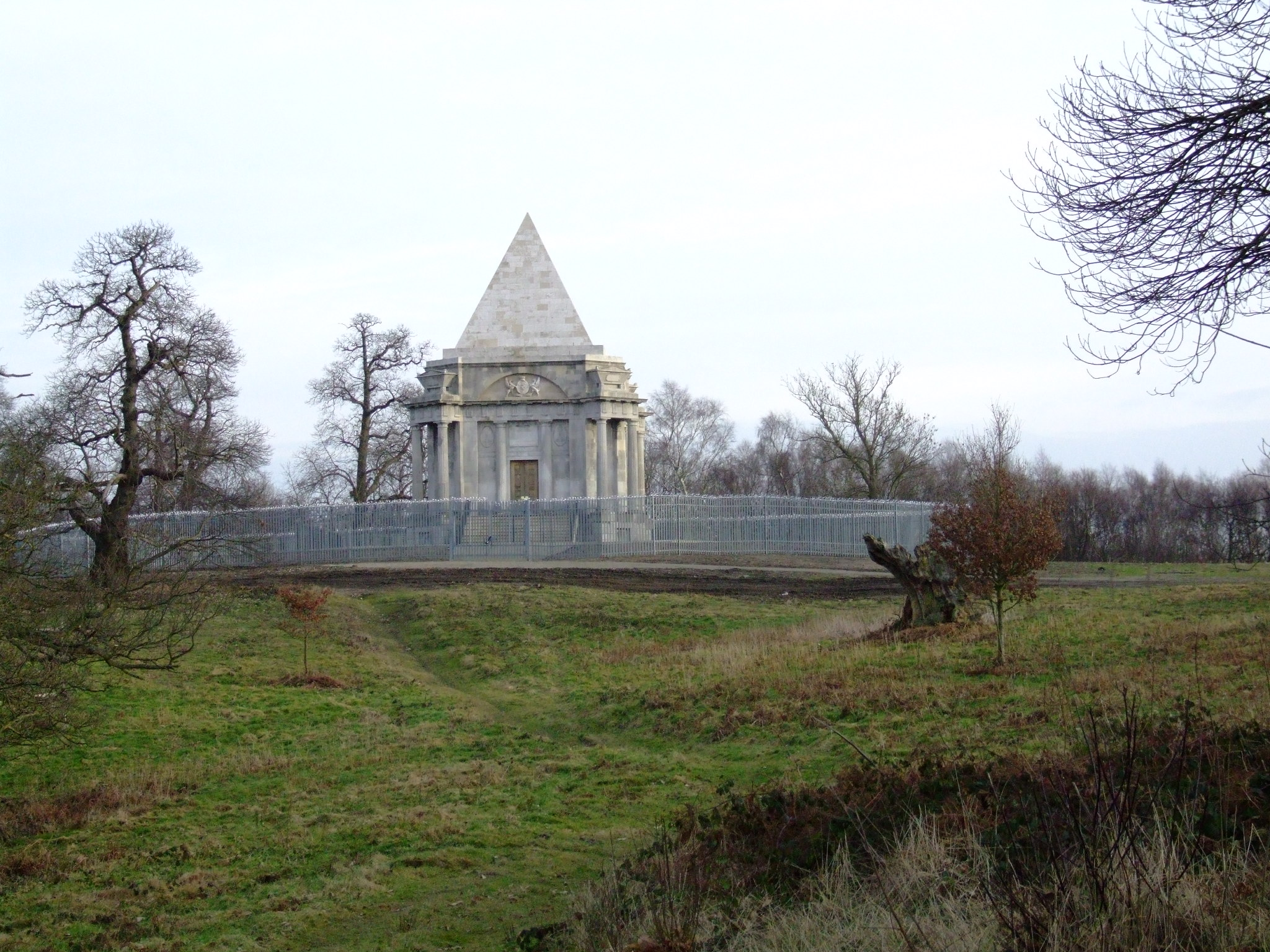
Before restoration, with anti-vandal fence

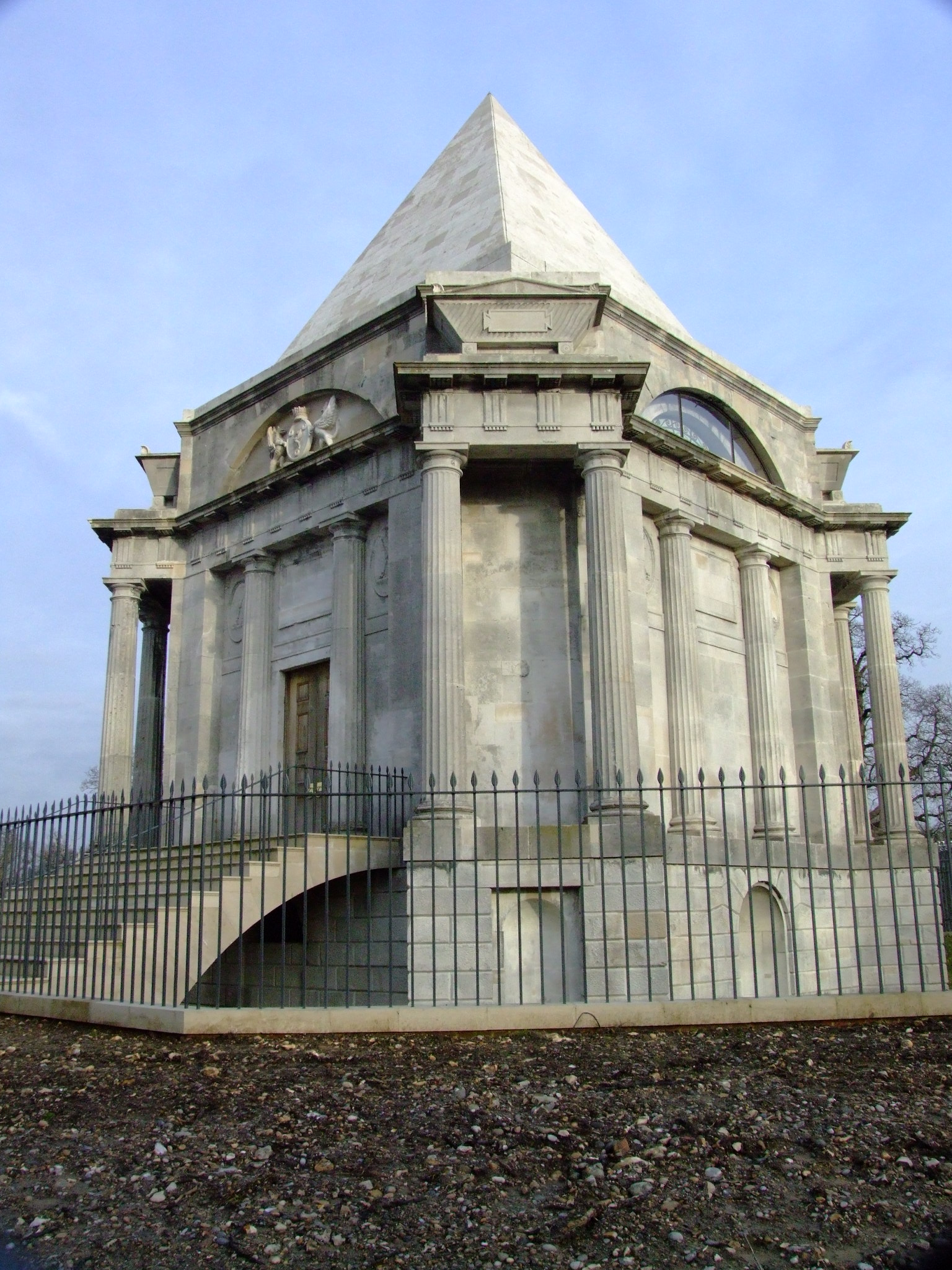
After restoration

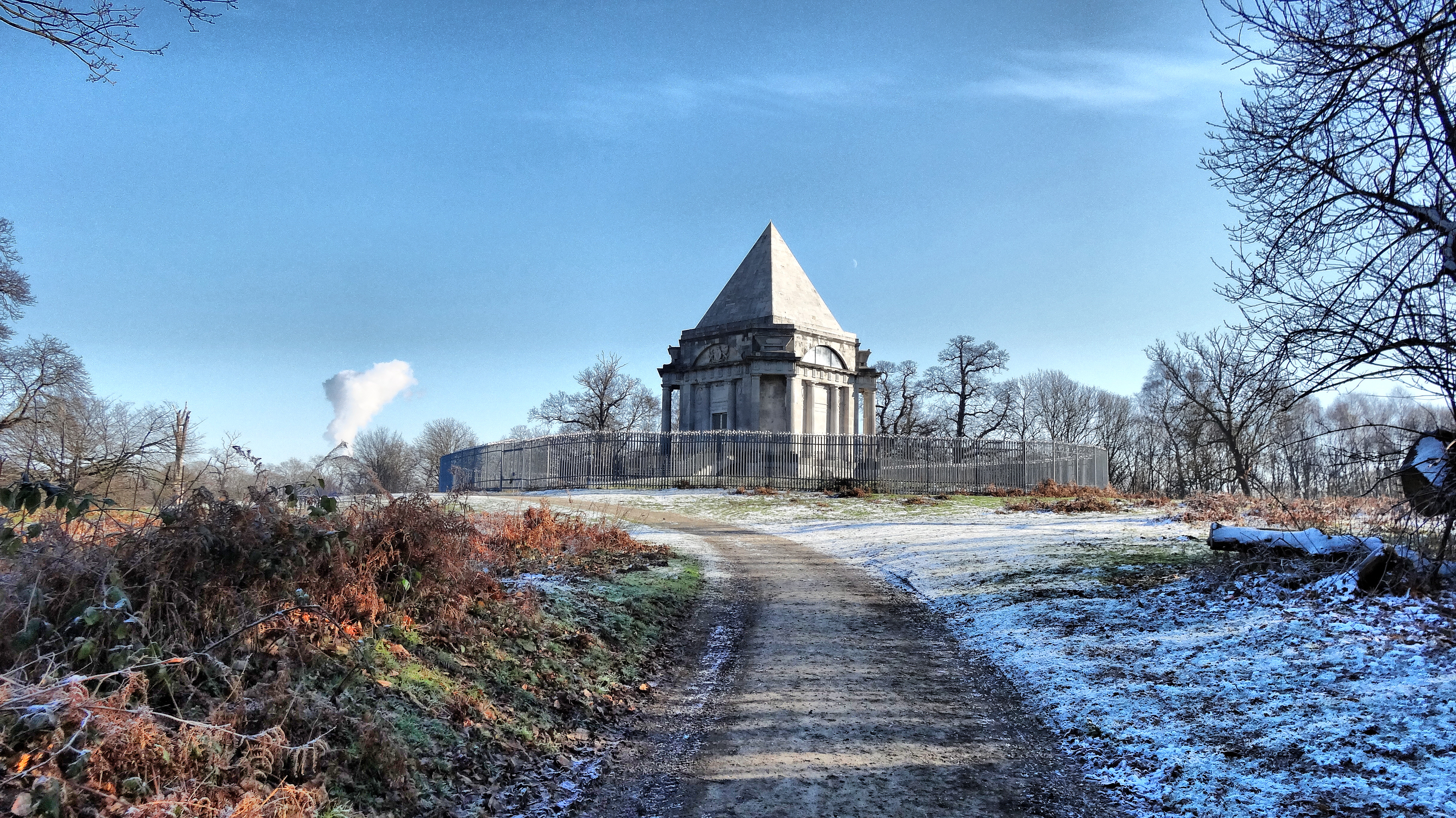
The Darnley Mausoleum in winter

The Darnley Mausoleum, or Cobham Mausoleum as it is often now referred to, is a Grade I Listed building, now owned by the National Trust and situated in Cobham Woods, Kent (OS grid ref: TQ694684). It was designed by James Wyatt for the 4th Earl of Darnley of Cobham Hall according to detailed instructions in the will of the 3rd Earl of Darnley. It was never used for interments. The woodland is part of the parkland laid out by Humphry Repton, and is 1.6 km from the North Downs Way.

== History ==
The Earls of Darnley had been buried at Westminster Abbey, but after the death in 1781 of John Bligh, the 3rd Earl, spaces at the Abbey were no longer available. James Wyatt (1746–1813), a fashionable and extremely prolific architect of the time, was commissioned to design a mausoleum to hold the coffins of the Earls and their family members. Wyatt exhibited the design at the Royal Academy in 1783. A slightly modified design was completed in 1786 under the supervision of George Dance the Younger (1741–1825), as Wyatt had a poor reputation for supervising the execution of his work.

For obscure reasons the mausoleum was never consecrated so no bodies were laid to rest there. However, shortly after it was completed, Humphry Repton (1752–1818) started to redesign the landscapes around Cobham Hall for the 4th Earl in the 1790s and subsequently over nearly 30 years. As a result the mausoleum became an important landscape feature, sitting at the highest point of the Darnley estate.

== Design ==
The mausoleum is built of brick faced with Portland stone, is square with projecting chamfered corners, and surmounted by a pyramid. The form is an unusually grand classical temple, using Roman Doric order, fluted columns in antis on the face, prostyle on the angles. The mausoleum is a high point of the neo-classical period in Britain, which was much more concerned than the preceding baroque period that classical architecture should be used correctly according to ancient Greek and Roman precedent. However, the pyramid-shaped roof, the mausoleum's most distinctive feature, while usual in classical architecture may have been derived by Wyatt from a painting by Nicolas Poussin rather than directly from antique precedents. There is a flying staircase to the piano nobile. There are lunette openings above the cornice filled with amber glass to create an ethereal light inside. Tomb chests are above the angle architraves. On the piano nobile, there is a circular chapel with Tivoli variant Corinthian order columns of rose marble and a coffered dome of stone.

The crypt at the lower level is accessed by steps at the rear and is lined in stone. It has 32 coffin shelves under a shallow stone dome. The mausoleum is important because of its architect, its situation in parkland at a predominant position on the North Downs, and as a demonstration of 'the Age of Enlightenment's preoccupation with a 'classical way of death'.

== Decline ==
The Darnley family sold off the hall in the 1950s though they kept the mausoleum and some of the land. Without the gamekeeper maintaining security the building became prone to vandalism. On 5 November 1980, an arson attack in the crypt brought down the chapel floor. It continued to decline, and schemes proposed included moving it to Shorne Woods Country Park or the United States, or for major extensions to form a large classical house. These came to nothing. In the same period vandalism and joy-riding of stolen cars became endemic in the woods, making it effectively out-of-bounds to mainstream users.

== Restoration ==
In 2001, Gravesham Council purchased the mausoleum and its surrounding woods from the liquidators with funding from Union Railways, which built the High Speed One railway nearby, as part of the environmental remediation programme for the new line. The Cobham Ashenbank Management Scheme, known as CAMS, was formed as a consortium comprising the National Trust, English Heritage, Cobham Hall, Natural England, Kent County Council and Gravesham Council. CAMS carried out the restoration of the mausoleum and the parkland around it with the help of a £6 million grant from the Heritage Lottery Fund. Some original drawings exist and in 1946, James Wraight RIBA photographed and made full, measured drawings of the building, which facilitated restoration to its previous state before any vandalism.

In 2013, on completion of the restoration of the mausoleum, it was transferred to the National Trust, along with the area of historic pasture and grazed woodland surrounding it. The mausoleum is now regularly open to the public with visitor facilities in a nearby barn. The restoration of the mausoleum is part of a larger scheme to restore Cobham Park and its landscapes to close to those designed by Humphry Repton, and return Cobham Woods to a wood pasture managed environment. The architects for the restoration were Purcell Miller Tritton. The building won the 2010 Kent Design Award in the Conservation & Craftsmanship Category and also the Project of the Year award.
