= Baron Clifton =

Title in the Peerage of England

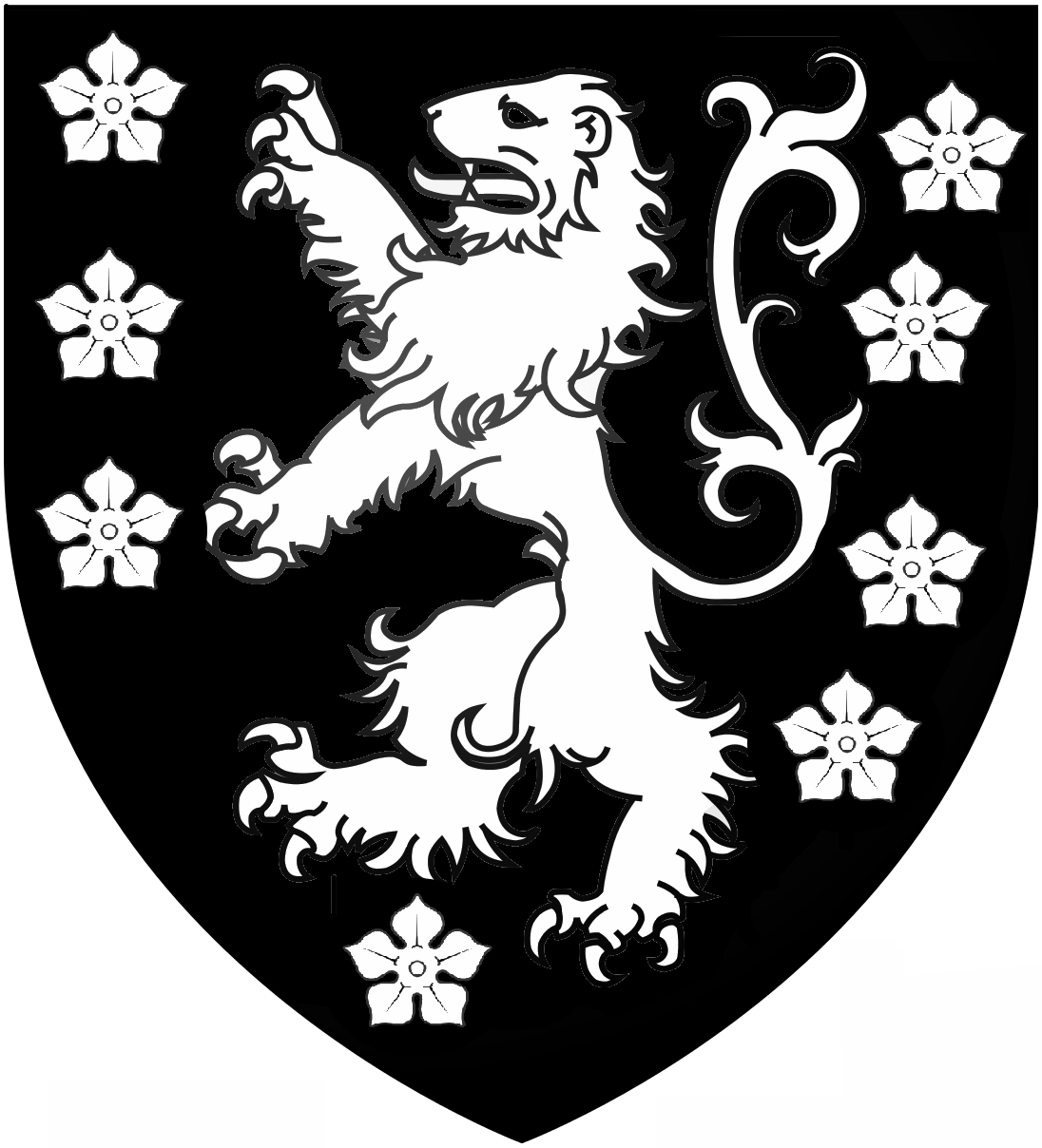
Arms of Clifton of Clifton, Nottinghamshire (Baron Clifton of Leighton Bromswold): Sable semée of cinquefoils and a lion rampant argent

Baron Clifton, of Leighton Bromswold in the County of Huntingdon, is a title in the Peerage of England. It was created in 1608 for Sir Gervase Clifton, who commissioned Prebendal house which was built by John Thorpe and later owned by the Clifton baronets branch of the family. The peerage was created by writ, which means that it can descend through both male and female lines. Lord Clifton died without surviving male issue and was succeeded by his daughter Katherine, the second Baroness. She married Esmé Stewart, 3rd Duke of Lennox (see the Duke of Lennox (1581 creation) for earlier history of this title). They were both succeeded by their eldest son James, the fourth Duke and third Baron. When he died the titles passed to his son, the fifth Duke and fourth Baron. On his death in 1660 at the age of 11, the barony separated from the dukedom. The barony was inherited by the late Duke's sister Mary, the fifth Baroness. She married Richard Butler, 1st Earl of Arran, but died aged only 18. She was succeeded by her first cousin the sixth Duke of Lennox, who became the sixth Baron Clifton as well. He was the son of Lord George Stuart, the fourth son of the third Duke and the second Baroness Clifton. On his death, the barony and dukedom again separated.

The dukedom became extinct (although this has later been questioned; see the Earl of Darnley) while the barony was passed on to the Duke's sister Katherine, the seventh Baroness. She was the wife of Henry O'Brien, Lord Ibracken, eldest son of Henry O'Brien, 7th Earl of Thomond. She established her claim to the peerage in 1674. She was succeeded by her daughter Katherine, the eighth Baroness. She was the wife of Edward Hyde, Viscount Cornbury (who after his wife's death succeeded as third Earl of Clarendon). Lady Clifton was succeeded by their son Edward, the ninth Baron. He predeceased his father and never succeeded in the earldom. He was succeeded in the barony by his sister Theodosia, the tenth Baroness. She married John Bligh, 1st Earl of Darnley. For further history of the barony, see the Earl of Darnley (1725 creation). Since then in 1900, the 17th baroness inherited the barony on the death of her father when she was seven months old.

== Barons Clifton (1608) ==
- Gervase Clifton, 1st Baron Clifton (d. 1618)
- Katherine Clifton, 2nd Baroness Clifton, Duchess consort of Lennox (c. 1592–1637)
- James Stewart, 4th Duke of Lennox, 3rd Baron Clifton (1612–1655)
- Esmé Stewart, 5th Duke of Lennox, 4th Baron Clifton (1649–1660)
- Mary Butler, 5th Baroness Clifton (1651–1668)
- Charles Stewart, 6th Duke of Lennox, 6th Baron Clifton (1639–1672)
- Katherine O'Brien, 7th Baroness Clifton (c. 1640–1702)
- Katherine Hyde, 8th Baroness Clifton (1663–1706)
- Edward Hyde, 9th Baron Clifton (1691–1713)
- Theodosia Bligh, 10th Baroness Clifton (1695–1722)
- Edward Bligh, 2nd Earl of Darnley, 11th Baron Clifton (1715–1747)
- John Bligh, 3rd Earl of Darnley, 12th Baron Clifton (1719–1781)
- John Bligh, 4th Earl of Darnley, 13th Baron Clifton (1767–1831)
- Edward Bligh, 5th Earl of Darnley, 14th Baron Clifton (1795–1835)
- John Stuart Bligh, 6th Earl of Darnley, 15th Baron Clifton (1827–1896)
- Edward Henry Stuart Bligh, 7th Earl of Darnley, 16th Baron Clifton (1851–1900)
- Elizabeth Adeline Mary Bligh, 17th Baroness Clifton (1900–1937)
- Esme Ivo Bligh, 9th Earl of Darnley, 18th Baron Clifton (1886–1955)
- Peter Stuart Bligh, 10th Earl of Darnley, 19th Baron Clifton (1915–1980)
- Adam Ivo Stuart Bligh, 11th Earl of Darnley, 20th Baron Clifton (1941–2017)
- Ivo Donald Bligh, 12th Earl of Darnley, 21st Baron Clifton (b. 1968)

== Baron Clifton of Buckenham Castle, Norfolk (1376) ==
The title of Baron Clifton "of Buckenham Castle, Norfolk" was created in 1376 and became extinct in 1447. The descent was as follows:

- John de Clifton, 1st Baron Clifton (d.1388), of Buckenham Castle in Norfolk, was summoned to Parliament in 1376 when he is deemed to have become Baron Clifton. He married Elizabeth Cromwell, a daughter and in her issue an heiress of Ralph de Cromwell, 1st Baron Cromwell (d.1398) of Tattershall in Lincolnshire. He died on the Island of Rhodes in 1388.
- Constantine de Clifton, 2nd Baron Clifton (1372–1395), son and heir, who married Margaret Howard, sister of Sir John Howard and daughter of Sir Robert Howard (d.1389) of Wiggenhall and East Winch.

- Constantine de Clifton, 3rd Baron Clifton (1394–1447), son and heir, who married Joan Thorpe, a daughter and co-heiress of John Thorpe of Ashwell Thorpe, but died without issue, when the barony became extinct. He was buried at Wymondham Abbey in Norfolk. His heiress was his only sister Elizabeth Clifford, wife of Sir John Knyvett, to whose descendants passed Buckenham Castle, sold in about 1650 by Sir Philip Knyvett, 1st Baronet (died 1655). (See Knyvett baronets "of Buckenham in the County of Norfolk").
