= Theodosia Bligh, 10th Baroness Clifton =

English peeress (1695–1722)

- Born: 9 November 1695
- Died: 30 July 1722 (aged 26)
- Buried: Westminster Abbey
- Spouse: John Bligh, 1st Earl of Darnley
- Issue: 7, including Edward, John
- Father: Edward Hyde, 3rd Earl of Clarendon
- Mother: Katherine O'Brien, 8th Baroness Clifton

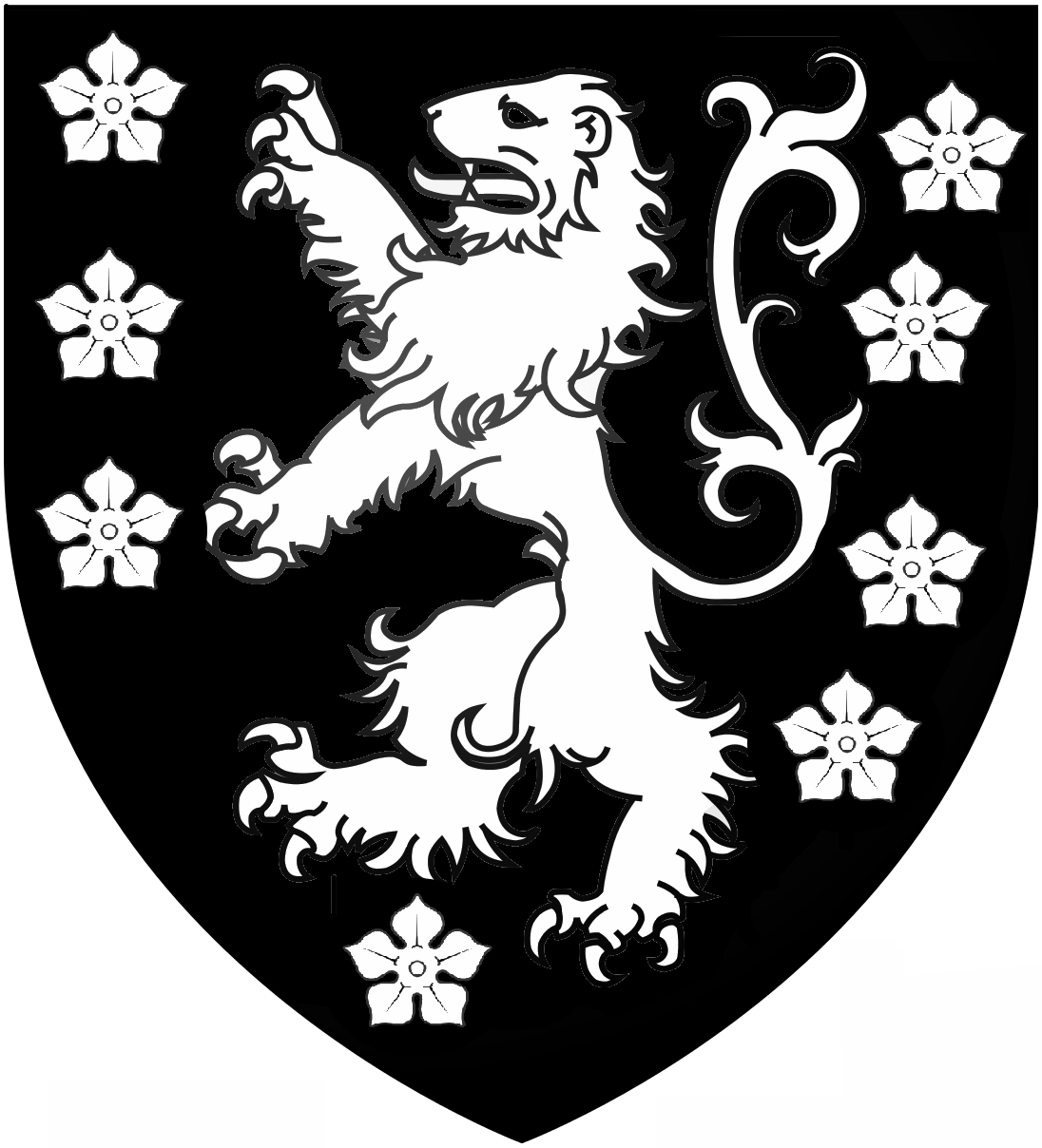
Arms of Clifton of Clifton, Nottinghamshire (Baron Clifton of Leighton Bromswold): Sable semée of cinquefoils and a lion rampant argent

Theodosia Bligh, 10th Baroness Clifton (née Lady Theodosia Hyde; 9 November 1695 – 30 July 1722), was an English peeress.

== Life ==
Baroness Clifton was the third child and second daughter of Edward Hyde, 3rd Earl of Clarendon and Katherine Hyde, 8th Baroness Clifton. Her mother's title went first to her brother Edward Hyde, 9th Baron Clifton, but after his death from a 'surfeit of drinking', she succeeded as the 10th Baroness Clifton, of Leighton Bromswold on 12 February 1713.

Baroness Clifton married John Bligh, MP for Athboy, soon afterwards, on 24 August 1713 at Westminster Abbey. They had six children and Baroness Clifton died in childbirth in 1722. She was buried on 15 August 1722 at Westminster Abbey. Baroness Clifton's title passed to her second son, Edward. Her husband John was created Baron Clifton of Rathmore in 1721, and after her death was further elevated as Viscount Darnley and later Earl of Darnley in the Peerage of Ireland (Theodosia's ancestors, the Dukes of Lennox, had also been Earls of Darnley in Scotland).

The portrait called "Lady Theodosia Bligh, Countess of Glandore" painted in the manner of John Vanderbank the younger, it was originally misattributed to be her daughter but is now thought to be the Baroness Clifton. It is now in the collection of Castle Ward, County Down.

== Children ==
- Lady Ann Bligh (died 7 February 1789), married firstly Robert Hawkins-Magill, and secondly Bernard Ward, 1st Viscount Bangor, and had a daughter, Theodosia Meade, Countess of Clanwilliam by her first marriage and eight children by her second marriage
- Lady Mary Bligh (died 4 March 1791) married William Tighe and had issue
- George Bligh (died 31 October 1714)
- Edward Bligh, 2nd Earl of Darnley (9 November 1715 – 22 July 1747)
- John Bligh, 3rd Earl of Darnley (28 September 1719 – 31 July 1781)
- Lady Theodosia Bligh (1722–20 May 1777), married William Crosbie, 1st Earl of Glandore

Peerage of England
Preceded by Edward Hyde	Baroness Clifton; 1713–1722	Succeeded by Edward Bligh
