= Blye (disambiguation) =

Blye may refer to:

== In places ==
- Blye, commune in the Jura department in Franche-Comté in eastern France

== In people ==
In first/middle names

- Blye Pagon Faust, American film producer
- Judy Blye Wilson, American casting director

In surnames

- Allan Blye (1937-2024), American television writer
- Birdie Blye (1871–1935), American pianist
- Maggie Blye (1942–2016), American actress
- Ron Blye (born 1943), American football player
- Sylvester Blye (born 1938), American basketball player

== In fiction ==
- "Blye, K., Part 2", 17th episode of the third season of the American crime drama television series NCIS: Los Angeles

== See also ==
- Bly (disambiguation)
