= Robert Bligh =

Irish Anglican dean (c. 1704–1778)

Robert Bligh (c. 1704 – 1778) was an Irish Anglican dean in the 18th century.

== Early life ==
Bligh was the son of Thomas Bligh (1654–1710) and his wife Elizabeth Naper (d. 1737). Bligh's elder brothers were John Bligh, 1st Earl of Darnley and Lt.-Gen. Thomas Bligh, best known for his service during the Seven Years' War. Both of his elder brothers and his son served in the Irish House of Commons.

He was educated at Trinity College, Dublin.

== Career ==
He was Dean of Elphin from 1768 until his death in 1778.

== Personal life ==
On 1 July 1742 in County Meath, he married Catherine (Kitty) Elliott (1714–55). Kitty, a daughter of Major-General Roger Elliott and Charlotte Elliot, was sister to Major-General Granville Elliott, and widow of Charles Boyle (1710-), of Araglin Bridge, County Cork.

On 18 March 1759, he married secondly to Frances Winthrop (b. 1735) in London. Together, they were the parents of:

- Frances Theodosia Bligh (d. 1802), who married Robert Jocelyn, 2nd Earl of Roden.
- Thomas Cherburgh Bligh (c. 1761–1830), who married Lady Theodosia Bligh, a daughter of Bligh's nephew, John Bligh, 3rd Earl of Darnley.
- Catherine Maria Bligh (d. c. 1801), who married Hon. Hugh Howard, son of Ralph Howard, 1st Viscount Wicklow, in 1792.
- Robert Elphin Bligh, who died without issue.

Bligh died about 1778.
