= Bly =

Bly or BLY may refer to:

== Places ==
- Bly, Missouri, a ghost town
- Bly, Oregon, a small town in Oregon
- Bly, the fictional setting of The Turn of the Screw

== Transport ==
- Belmullet Aerodrome in Ireland (IATA code BLY)
- Bletchley railway station in England (UK National Rail station code BLY)
- Burnley railway station in Victoria (Australian railway station code BLY)

== People ==
- Bly (surname)

== See also ==
- Bligh (disambiguation)
