= The Allegory of Love (Veronese) =

Series of four paintings by Paolo Veronese

The Allegory of Love is a series of four paintings by Paolo Veronese, produced around 1575 as ceiling paintings. They were probably commissioned by Rudolph II, Holy Roman Emperor (1552–1612) for Prague Castle, or alternatively by someone else for a palace in Venice, where van Dyck may have seen them. They passed through the Orleans Collection in Paris then, after the French Revolution dispersed this, were owned by the Earls of Darnley, and mostly hung at Cobham Hall. Since 1891 they have belonged to the National Gallery in London. They seem to have been trimmed at the bottom of the canvases. Their intended sequence and titles (if any) are unknown, and the National Gallery has assigned various ones over the years.

== Description ==
Image	Titre	Format	Date	Notes
	Allegory of Love I Infidelity	189,9 x 189,9 cm	Circa 1575	
	Allegory of Love II; Scorn	188 x 188 cm	Circa 1575	
	Allegory of Love III; Respect	188 x 188 cm	Circa 1575	
	Allegory of Love IV; The Happy Union	188 x 188 cm	Circa 1575	
