= Edward Tighe =

Irish lawyer, writer and politician

Edward Tighe (1740-1801) was an Irish lawyer, writer and politician, who represented a number of constituencies in the Irish House of Commons. The son of William Tighe, MP for Wexford then for Wicklow, and Mary Bligh (daughter of John Bligh, 1st Earl of Darnley), he was educated at Eton College, and St. John's College, Cambridge, and called to the English bar in 1759 and the Irish bar in 1776.

== Political career ==
Tighe was first elected to the Irish parliament for Belturbet, Co. Cavan, in 1763, elected for Wicklow (succeeding his brother Richard William Tighe) in 1768, then Athboy Co. Meath, from 1776 (succeeding his elder brother William Tighe) until 1773 when he represented Wicklow again until 1797.

== Personal life ==
He had two full brothers, William and Richard, and a sister, Theodosia Blachford, a prominent Methodist. (Theodosia's daughter, his niece, was the poet Mary Tighe.) He had a half-brother, Rev. Thomas Tighe, who was instrumental in helping the young Patrick Brontë, and a half-sister, Barbara Sandys, from their father's second marriage to Margaret (née Theaker).

He married Ann Jones from Co. Westmeath and they had one son, George William Tighe (1776-1837) an agronomist who spent most of his life in Italy as the companion or husband of Margaret King.

Edward died in 1801, having been predeceased by his wife in 1792.
