= Earl of Darnley =

Hereditary title in the Peerage of Scotland

Earldom of Darnley
- Arms of Bligh: Azure, a Griffin segreant Or, armes and langued Gules, between three Crescents Argent. Crest: A Griffin’s Head erased Or. Supporters: On either side a Griffin wings expanded Or, ducally collared and chained Azure.
- Creation date: 29 June 1725
- Creation: Third
- Created by: King George I
- Peerage: Peerage of Ireland
- First holder: John Bligh, 1st Viscount Darnley
- Present holder: Ivo Bligh, 12th Earl of Darnley
- Heir apparent: Harry Bligh, Lord Clifton
- Remainder to: The 1st Earl's heirs male of the body lawfully begotten
- Subsidiary titles: Viscount Darnley; Baron Clifton of Leighton Bromswold; Baron Clifton of Rathmore
- Status: Extant
- Seat: Netherwood Manor
- Former seat: Cobham Hall
- Motto: FINEM RESPICE (Look to the end)

Earl of Darnley is a hereditary title that has been created three times, twice in the Peerage of Scotland and once in the Peerage of Ireland.

The first creation in the Scots Peerage came in 1580 in favour of Esme Stewart, 1st Earl of Lennox, who was created Duke of Lennox at the same time. The title of Lord Darnley had previously been held by John Stewart, head of the house of Stewart of Darnley and first Earl of Lennox (1488).

The second creation in the Peerage of Scotland came in 1675 in favour of Charles Lennox, 1st Duke of Richmond. He was made Duke of Lennox at the same time. For more information on this creation, see the Duke of Richmond. The title is extant.

The only creation in the Peerage of Ireland was in 1725 to John Bligh, 1st Earl of Darnley, descended from a prominent Devon family via a cadet branch which had settled in County Meath, Ireland; he was the son of the Rt Hon Thomas Bligh who was in turn the son of John Bligh, of Plymouth, a Commissioner of Customs and Excise despatched to Ireland in search of forfeited estates, and in turn his father was William Bligh, a prosperous Plymouth merchant.

John Bligh, 1st Earl of Darnley, married Theodosia Hyde, 10th Baroness Clifton (of Leighton Bromswold), great-granddaughter of Lord George Stuart, younger son of Esmé Stewart, 3rd Duke of Lennox, also 3rd Earl of Darnley (see the Baron Clifton of Leighton Bromswold and the Duke of Lennox for earlier history of these titles). He represented Athboy in the Irish House of Commons from 1709 to 1721. In 1721 he was raised to the Peerage of Ireland as Baron Clifton of Rathmore, in the County of Meath. In 1723 the Darnley title held by his wife's ancestors (which had become extinct on the death of Charles Stewart, 6th Duke of Lennox and 6th Earl of Darnley in 1672) was revived when he was created Viscount Darnley of Athboy in the County of Meath, in the Peerage of Ireland. In 1725 Bligh was further honoured when he was advanced as Earl of Darnley, in the County of Meath, also in the Peerage of Ireland. He was succeeded by his eldest son, the second Earl. He had already succeeded his mother in 1722 as eleventh Baron Clifton of Leighton Bromswold in the Peerage of England. Lord Darnley served as a Lord of the Bedchamber to Frederick, Prince of Wales, but died unmarried in 1747, aged 31.

He was succeeded by his younger brother, who thus became the third Earl. He had earlier represented Athboy in the Irish House of Commons and Maidstone in the British House of Commons. On his death the titles passed to his eldest son, the fourth Earl. In 1828 he presented a claim as heir-general to the dukedom of Lennox, challenged by the Countess Nugent, but the House of Lords did not come to any decision on the matter. He was succeeded by his second but eldest surviving son, the fifth Earl. He was elected as Member of Parliament for Canterbury and served as Lord Lieutenant of County Meath. On the death of his grandson, the seventh Earl (who had succeeded his father in 1896), the barony of Clifford of Leighton Bromswold separated from the Irish titles when it devolved upon the late Earl's daughter and only child, the ten-month-old Lady Elizabeth Bligh, who became the seventeenth holder of the barony by writ of summons. Lord Darnley was succeeded in the Irish titles by his younger brother, the eighth Earl. A talented and successful cricketer who captained MCC, he sat in the House of Lords as an Irish representative peer from 1905 to 1927. On his death the titles passed to his only son, the ninth Earl. In 1937 he succeeded his first cousin The Lady Clifton (who died unmarried) in her ancient English barony by writ of summons (being her heir-general, as eighteenth Baron Clifton of Leighton Bromswold). He was by his only son from his third marriage with Rosemary, Dowager Countess of Darnley (née Potter; died 2005), the eleventh Earl, who succeeded his half-brother (the only son from the first marriage of the ninth Earl), in 1980. As of 2017 the title is held by his only son, the twelfth earl, who succeeded his father in that year.

Several other members of the Bligh family have also attained distinction. Thomas Bligh (1654–1710), father of the first Earl, represented County Meath as its MP in the Irish Parliament and was sworn of the Irish Privy Council. Thomas Bligh, younger brother of the first Earl, was a general in the British Army and represented Athboy in the Irish House of Commons for sixty years. The Very Reverend Robert Bligh (c. 1704–1778), another brother of the first Earl, was an Anglican clergyman who became Dean of Elphin. General the Hon. Edward Bligh (1769–1840), second son of the third Earl, was a general in the British Army. The Hon. William Bligh (1775–1845), third son of the third Earl, was a colonel in the Army. The Hon. Sir John Bligh (1798–1872), fourth son of the fourth Earl, was a diplomat and served as Envoy Extraordinary and Minister Plenipotentiary to Hanover. Susan Bligh, Countess of Darnley, the eleventh Earl's wife was appointed Lord Lieutenant of Herefordshire in 2008.

Cobham Hall (in 1868)

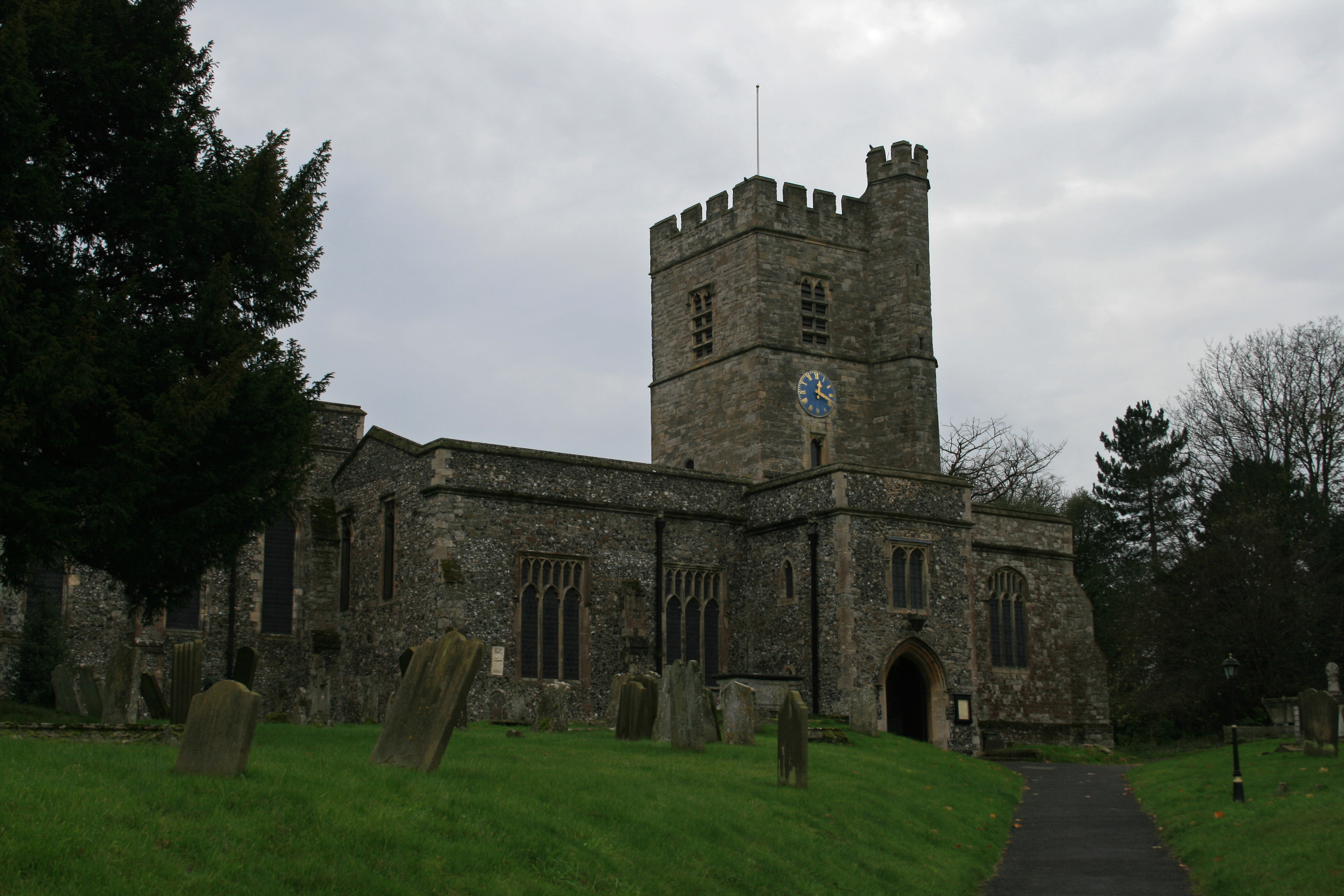
Collegiate Church of Cobham, Kent

The family seat is Netherwood Manor at Thornbury, Herefordshire, near Tenbury Wells, Worcestershire. The former was Cobham Hall, near Gravesend, Kent, from the 18th century until 1957, and the family still retains some property in Cobham village.

== Earls of Darnley (first creation) ==
- see the Duke of Lennox (1581 creation)

== Earls of Darnley (second creation) ==
- see the Duke of Richmond (1675 creation)

== Earls of Darnley (third creation) ==
Arms of Bligh: Azure, a griffin segreant or armed and langued gules between three crescents argent

=== John Bligh, 1st Earl of Darnley (1687–1728) ===
John Bligh, 1st Earl of Darnley (1687–1728), who married, in 1713, Lady Theodosia Hyde. He was descended from a prominent Devon family via a cadet branch which had settled in County Meath, Ireland. Following his marriage in 1713 to Theodosia Hyde, 10th Baroness Clifton (of Leighton Bromswold), a descendant of Esmé Stewart, 3rd Duke of Lennox, also 3rd Earl of Darnley, he was in 1725 created Earl of Darnley (a reference to his ancestors the Stewarts of Darnley of Cobham) in the Peerage of Ireland. He was the son of Thomas Bligh, the son of John Bligh of Plymouth (son of William Bligh, a prosperous Plymouth merchant), a Commissioner of Customs and Excise despatched to Ireland in search of forfeited estates. He represented Athboy in the Irish House of Commons from 1709 to 1721. In 1721 he was raised to the Peerage of Ireland as Baron Clifton of Rathmore, in the County of Meath. In 1723 the Darnley title held by his wife's ancestors (which had become extinct on the death of Charles Stewart, 6th Duke of Lennox and 6th Earl of Darnley in 1672) was revived when he was created Viscount Darnley, of Athboy in the County of Meath, in the Peerage of Ireland. In 1725 Bligh was further honoured when he was advanced as Earl of Darnley, in the County of Meath, also in the Peerage of Ireland. He died in 1728 and was buried with his wife in the "Hyde Vault" in Westminster Abbey, in the north ambulatory, near the steps up to Henry VII's chapel.

=== Edward Bligh, 2nd Earl of Darnley (1715–1747) ===
Edward Bligh, 2nd Earl of Darnley (1715–1747); second, and eldest surviving son of the 1st Earl. He had already succeeded his mother in 1722 as eleventh Baron Clifton of Leighton Bromswold in the Peerage of England. He served as a Lord of the Bedchamber to Frederick, Prince of Wales, but died unmarried in 1747, aged 31.

=== John Bligh, 3rd Earl of Darnley (1719–1781) ===
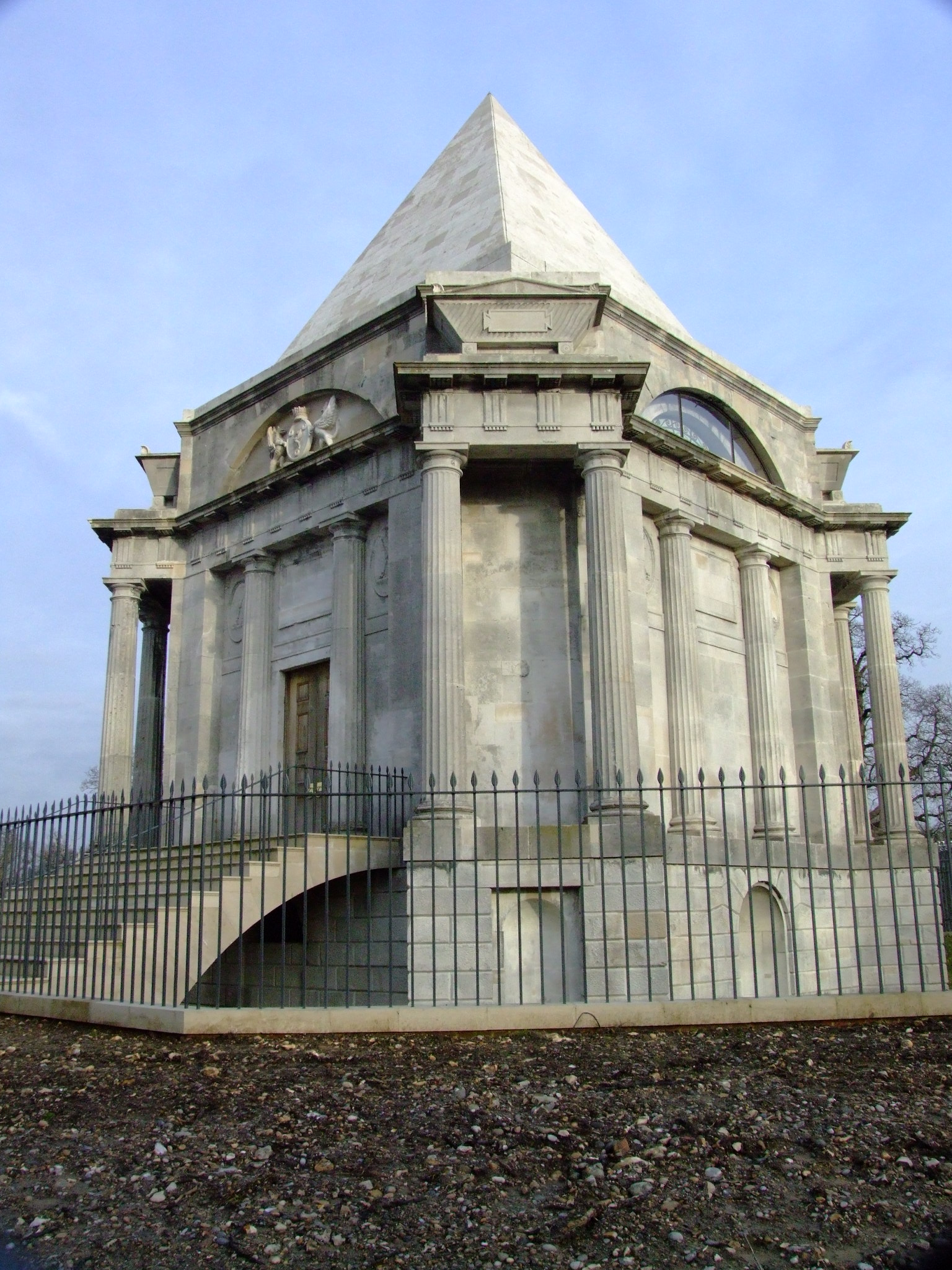
The Darnley Mausoleum in Cobham Woods, built in 1786 as ordered by the will of the 3rd Earl

John Bligh, 3rd Earl of Darnley (1719–1781); third son of the 1st Earl. He served as a Member of Parliament for Maidstone and in the Irish House of Commons for Athboy. He carried out various building works at Cobham, between 1768 and 1770 he added an extra floor to the west front, to the design of Sir William Chambers. Between 1771 and 1773 he added a 2-storey corridor to the north side of the central block and began building the east court (or "kitchen court") to match the two Tudor wings. He redecorated several rooms in the classical style. By his will he left instructions for the building of the Darnley Mausoluem within the deer park, to house the embalmed corpses of his descendants, the "Hyde Vault" in Westminster Abbey (in the north ambulatory, near the steps leading up to Henry VII's Lady Chapel) having become full. He required it to be in the form of a square building with a "prominent pyramid" and surrounded by a dry moat, possibly having been inspired by the Pyramid of Cestius (12 BC) in Rome which he would have seen on his grand tour during his youth. Although the work was duly completed in 1786, to the design of the architect James Wyatt, it never received the approval of the local Bishop of Rochester to become a consecrated building and thus was never used for its intended purpose.

=== John Bligh, 4th Earl of Darnley (1767–1831) ===
John Bligh, 4th Earl of Darnley (1767–1831); eldest son of the 3rd Earl. In 1828 he presented a claim as heir-general to the dukedom of Lennox, but the House of Lords did not come to any decision on the matter. He was succeeded by his second but eldest surviving son, the fifth Earl. He built a bridge connecting the north front to the terrace forming an entrance under a porte-cochere, to the design of James Wyatt. He added some Gothic details to the interior and added decorative detail to the hall. In 1817–18 he employed George and John Repton to effect some Tudor-style alterations.

=== Edward Bligh, 5th Earl of Darnley (1795–1835) ===
Edward Bligh, 5th Earl of Darnley (1795–1835); second, and eldest surviving son of the 4th Earl, who served as a Member of Parliament for Canterbury and served as Lord Lieutenant of County Meath. His daughter Lady Elizabeth Bligh (1830–1914) (wife of Sir Reginald Cust and mother of the courtier Sir Lionel Cust) was a historian and genealogist, who (as "Lady Elizabeth Cust") was the author of Some Account of the Stuarts of Aubigny, in France, London, 1891, dedicated by permission to Queen Victoria and intended "to preserve from oblivion the gallant deeds of the Stewarts of Aubigny who commanded the Scots Guards and Scots Men-at-Arms in the great wars of France from the time of Charles VII to that of Henri IV". She also wrote Records of the Cust family of Pinchbeck, Stamford and Belton in Lincolnshire, 1479-1700, 3 vols, 1898. He died aged 39 of lockjaw after an axe injury when felling timber on the Cobham Hall estate and was buried at Cobham.

=== John Bligh, 6th Earl of Darnley (1827–1896) ===
John Stuart Bligh, 6th Earl of Darnley (1827–1896); eldest son of the 5th Earl, who in about 1840 altered the dining room, the last significant alteration until the house was converted into a school. In 1875 he paid for the restoration of the magnificent monument in Westminster Abbey of Ludovic Stewart, 2nd Duke of Lennox, 1st Duke of Richmond (1574–1624), Seigneur d'Aubigny, the childless uncle of James Stewart, 1st Duke of Richmond, 4th Duke of Lennox, the first Stewart owner of Cobham Hall. He served as a deputy lieutenant of Kent from 1847 and in 1848 was commissioned a captain in the Cobham Troop of the West Kent Yeomanry. He was an administrator, then president of Kent MCC, playing one match for the 'Gentlemen of Kent' but starting a family association with the club.

=== Edward Bligh, 7th Earl of Darnley (1851–1900) ===
Edward Henry Stuart Bligh, 7th Earl of Darnley (1851–1900); eldest son of the 6th Earl. As "Lord Clifton" he played first-class cricket for Kent 1871-9 and "spent money like water", greatly reducing the wealth of his family. On his death without male issue the barony of Clifford of Leighton Bromswold separated from the Irish titles when it devolved upon his only child and sole heiress, the ten-month-old Lady Elizabeth Bligh, who became the seventeenth holder of the barony by writ of summons. He was succeeded in the Irish titles by his younger brother the 8th Earl.

=== Ivo Bligh, 8th Earl of Darnley (1859–1927) ===
Ivo Francis Walter Bligh, 8th Earl of Darnley (1859–1927), younger brother of 7th Earl. A talented and successful cricketer who captained the English Test team, he met his Australian wife Florence Morphy when touring Australia with the English team in 1882–83. During the First World War he and his wife set aside the state apartments of Cobham Hall to accommodate 50 Australian officers. After the War in the 1920s he let Cobham Hall and in 1925 sold the collection of paintings and the outlying estate and converted the eastern deer park into a golf course. He sat in the House of Lords as an Irish representative peer from 1905 to 1927. On his death in 1927 the titles passed to his only son, the ninth Earl.

=== Esme Bligh, 9th Earl of Darnley (1886–1955) ===
Esme Ivo Bligh, 9th Earl of Darnley (1886–1955), eldest son of the 8th Earl. In 1937 he succeeded his first cousin Baroness Clifton of Leighton Bromswold (who died unmarried) in her ancient English barony, being her heir-general, as 18th Baron Clifton of Leighton Bromswold.

=== Peter Bligh, 10th Earl of Darnley (1915–1980) ===
Peter Stuart Bligh, 10th Earl of Darnley (1915–1980) eldest son of the 9th Earl. In 1959 following the death of his father and facing heavy inheritance tax demands, he sold the house, gardens and part of the park to the "Land Fund", which sold them on in 1963 to the Westwood Educational Trust Limited (a charity in the form of a private company limited by guarantee without share capital, formed in 1961) which established and operates the school which still occupies the site today. In 1968 the 10th Earl resided nearby at Puckle Hill, Shorne, near Gravesend, Kent, "a large, robust Arts and Crafts house constructed in 1923".

=== Adam Bligh, 11th Earl of Darnley (1941–2017) ===
Adam Bligh, 11th Earl of Darnley (1941–2017), half-brother and heir of the 10th Earl (2nd son of the 9th Earl by his 3rd wife). In 1968 he resided at Meadow House in Cobham. In 1985 he founded the "Cobham Hall Heritage Trust" with the aim of "protecting the gardens, grounds and garden buildings of the Cobham Hall estate and to educating the public in their historical significance". From 1991 he served as vice-chairman of the governors of Cobham Hall School, where his sister Lady Harriet was educated. He moved to Herefordshire with his family in October 1984 to farm the Netherwood Estate. He was chairman of the Herefordshire Historic Churches Trust, the Hereford Cathedral Perpetual Trust, as well as chair of Governors of Hereford Cathedral School.

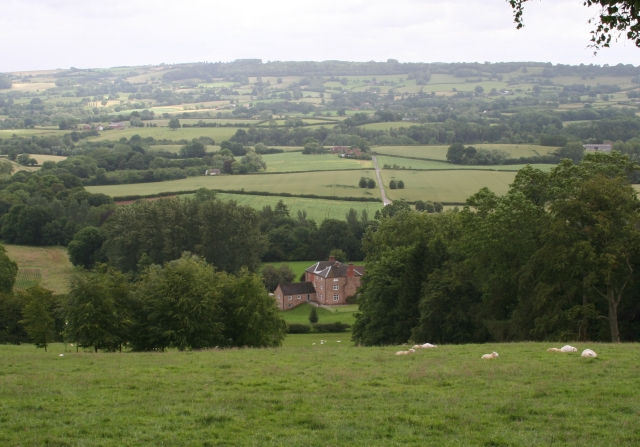
Netherwood Manor at Thornbury, Herefordshire, current family seat

=== Ivo Bligh, 12th Earl of Darnley (1968–) ===
Ivo Donald Bligh, 12th Earl of Darnley (born 17 April 1968) is the son of the 11th Earl and his wife Susan Elaine Anderson. Formally styled as Lord Clifton of Rathmore from 1980, he was educated at Marlborough College and the University of Edinburgh.

On 18 June 2017 he succeeded as Baron Clifton (E., 1608), Earl of Darnley (I., 1725), Viscount Darnley of Athboy (I., 1723), and Baron Clifton of Rathmore (I., 1721).

On 13 September 1997, he married Peta Martine Beard, daughter of A. Robert Beard, and they have three sons. The heir apparent is their eldest son Harry Robert Stuart Bligh, Lord Clifton (b. 1999).
