= Edward Bligh (cricketer, died 1872) =

English cricketer

Personal information
- Full name: Edward Bligh
- Born: 1797; County Meath, Ireland
- Died: 11 April 1872 (aged 74–75); County Meath, Ireland

Domestic team information
- Years: Team
- 1819: Cambridge University

Edward Bligh of Brittas DL JP (1797 – 11 April 1872) was an Irish landowner. He was also a cricketer who played for Cambridge University in the 1810s. He is recorded in one match in 1819, totaling 26 runs with a highest score of 20 and holding 4 catches.

== Early life ==
He was the second son of Thomas Cherburgh Bligh, and Lady Theodosia Bligh, daughter of John Bligh, 3rd Earl of Darnley.

=== Education and cricket career ===
He was educated at Eton College, and matriculated in 1818 at St John's College, Cambridge. At Cambridge, he took part in one cricket match in 1819, totaling 26 runs with a highest score of 20 and holding 4 catches.

== Personal life ==
On 9 August 1820 at Horsham, he married Sophia Eversfield (1792–1843), daughter of William Markwick, who had changed his surname to Eversfield. They had two children:

- Theodosia Sophia Bligh (1821–1898), who in 1850 married Edward Tredcroft, and;
- Frederick Cherburgh Bligh (1828–1901) who in 1858 married Emily Matilda East, daughter of Hinton East.

== Bibliography ==
- Haygarth, Arthur (1996) [1862]. Scores & Biographies, Volume 1 (1744–1826). Kennington: Frederick Lillywhite. ISBN 978-19-00592-23-9.
- Haygarth, Arthur (1997) [1862]. Scores & Biographies, Volume 2 (1827–1840). Kennington: Frederick Lillywhite. ISBN 978-19-00592-23-9.
