= Bly (surname) =

Bly is a surname. Notable people with the surname include:

- Beldon Bly (1914–2006), American teacher and politician
- Billy Bly (1920–1982), English professional football goalkeeper
- Carol Bly (1930–2007), short story writer
- David Bly (born 1952), American politician
- Dré Bly (born 1977), American football coach and player
- John Bly (born 1939), English antiques specialist
- Jordan Bly (born 2002), American football player
- Mark Bly (born 1949), American dramaturge, educator, and author
- Mary Bly (born 1962), author who publishes under the name Eloisa James
- Nellie Bly, pen name of Elizabeth Cochrane Seaman (1864–1922), American journalist, author, industrialist, and charity worker
- Robert Bly (1926–2021), author of Iron John (book)
- Robert W. Bly (born 1957), American writer
- Stephen Bly (1944–2011), American author and politician
- Terry Bly (1935–2009), footballer who played for Norwich City and Peterborough United

== In fiction ==
- John Bly, the main antagonist in The Adventures of Brisco County, Jr. television series

== See also ==
- Bligh (disambiguation)
