= Edward Bligh, 2nd Earl of Darnley =

Irish peer

Arms of Bligh: Azure, a griffin segreant or armed and langued gules between three crescents argent

Edward Bligh, 2nd Earl of Darnley (9 November 1715 – 22 July 1747), lord of the Manor of Cobham, Kent, was an Irish peer born of an English family who resided in Kent.

The eldest son of John Bligh, 1st Earl of Darnley and Lady Theodosia Hyde, Baroness Clifton, he was educated at Westminster and at Geneva. He succeeded his mother as Baron Clifton in 1722 and, in 1728, his father as Earl of Darnley.

Lord Darnley was a Grand Master of Freemasons (1737 to 1738), elected a Fellow of the Royal Society (in 1737) and in 1742 was appointed a Lord of the Bedchamber to the Prince of Wales: a position that he held until his death. He was one of the Whigs who, under the auspices of William Pulteney, 1st Earl of Bath, opposed Robert Walpole's office. Although he never married, he is reputed to have been the lover of the popular Irish actress Margaret Woffington.

According to Westminster Abbey's Funeral Book and Burke's Peerage he died at Cobham Hall, the family seat, and was buried in Westminster Abbey on 1 August 1747, aged 31.

Peerage of England
Preceded by Theodosia Bligh	Baron Clifton; 1722–1747	Succeeded by John Bligh
Peerage of Ireland
Preceded by John Bligh	Earl of Darnley; 1728–1747	Succeeded by John Bligh
Masonic offices
Preceded by The Earl of Loudoun	Grand Master of the Premier Grand Lodge of England; 1737–1738	Succeeded by Marquess of Carnarvon
