= Edward Hyde, 3rd Earl of Clarendon =

English Army officer, politician and colonial administrator (1661–1723)

The Right Honourable The Earl of Clarendon PC
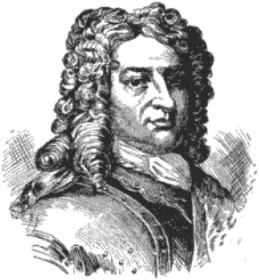

1st Governor of New Jersey in British North America
- In office 1701–1708
- Monarch: Anne
- Lieutenant: Col. Richard Ingoldesby; Lieutenant-Governor
- Preceded by: Office created
- Succeeded by: John, 4th Baron Lovelace

14th colonial Governor of New York
- In office 1702–1708
- Monarch: Anne
- Preceded by: John Nanfan
- Succeeded by: John, 4th Baron Lovelace

Personal details
- Born: The Hon. Edward Hyde; 28 November 1661 England
- Died: 31 March 1723 (aged 61) Chelsea, London, England
- Resting place: Westminster Abbey
- Party: Tory
- Spouse(s): Katherine O'Brien, 8th Baroness Clifton
- Children: Edward Bligh, 9th Baron Clifton, Catherine, Mary Flora, and Theodosia, 10th Baroness Clifton
- Parent(s): Henry Hyde, 2nd Earl of Clarendon; Theodosia Capell
- Education: Christ Church, Oxford
- Profession: Diplomat and governor in British North America
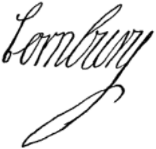
- Signature

Edward Hyde, 3rd Earl of Clarendon (28 November 1661 – 31 March 1723), styled Viscount Cornbury between 1674 and 1709, was an English Army officer, politician and colonial administrator. He was propelled into the forefront of English politics when he and part of his army defected from the Catholic King James II to support the newly arrived Protestant contender, William III of Orange. These actions were part of the beginning of the Glorious Revolution of 1688. Cornbury's choice to support his cousin Anne instead of William after the rebellion cost him his military commission. However, Cornbury's support of King William's reign eventually earned him the governorship of the provinces of New York and New Jersey; he served between 1701 and 1708.

As a High Tory governor, his primary mission was to protect the colonies during the War of the Spanish Succession (known in the Americas as Queen Anne's War, or the 2nd French and Indian War; 1701–1714). His administration successfully prevented French incursions into the middle colonies. However, he became mired in the region's many factional conflicts and accrued powerful political enemies such as Lewis Morris, who would go on to become Governor of New Jersey in 1738.

By 1708, war-weariness led to a shift in the political tide in Great Britain. Governor Cornbury was recalled from the colonies but was soon after installed as a member of Queen Anne's privy council. Lord Cornbury's fortunes changed again when George I was crowned King of Great Britain on 1 August 1714. Out of favour, Lord Cornbury died in Chelsea, London on 31 March 1723. Lord Cornbury's conduct as governor has been generally remembered as scandalous. He was accused by his political enemies of being a cross-dresser, a moral profligate, and wildly corrupt. Few contemporary accounts exist of his conduct. Modern writers disagree whether Cornbury was a cross-dresser or the reports were an invention of his enemies.

== Early life ==
The Honourable Edward Hyde, was born the only child of Henry, Viscount Cornbury & 2nd Earl of Clarendon (1638–1709) and Theodosia Capell (1640–1662), daughter of Arthur Capell, 1st Baron Capell of Hadham, and sister of Arthur Capell. Henry and Theodosia gave birth to Edward eleven months into their marriage. Only three months after Edward's birth, in March 1662, his mother Theodosia died of smallpox.

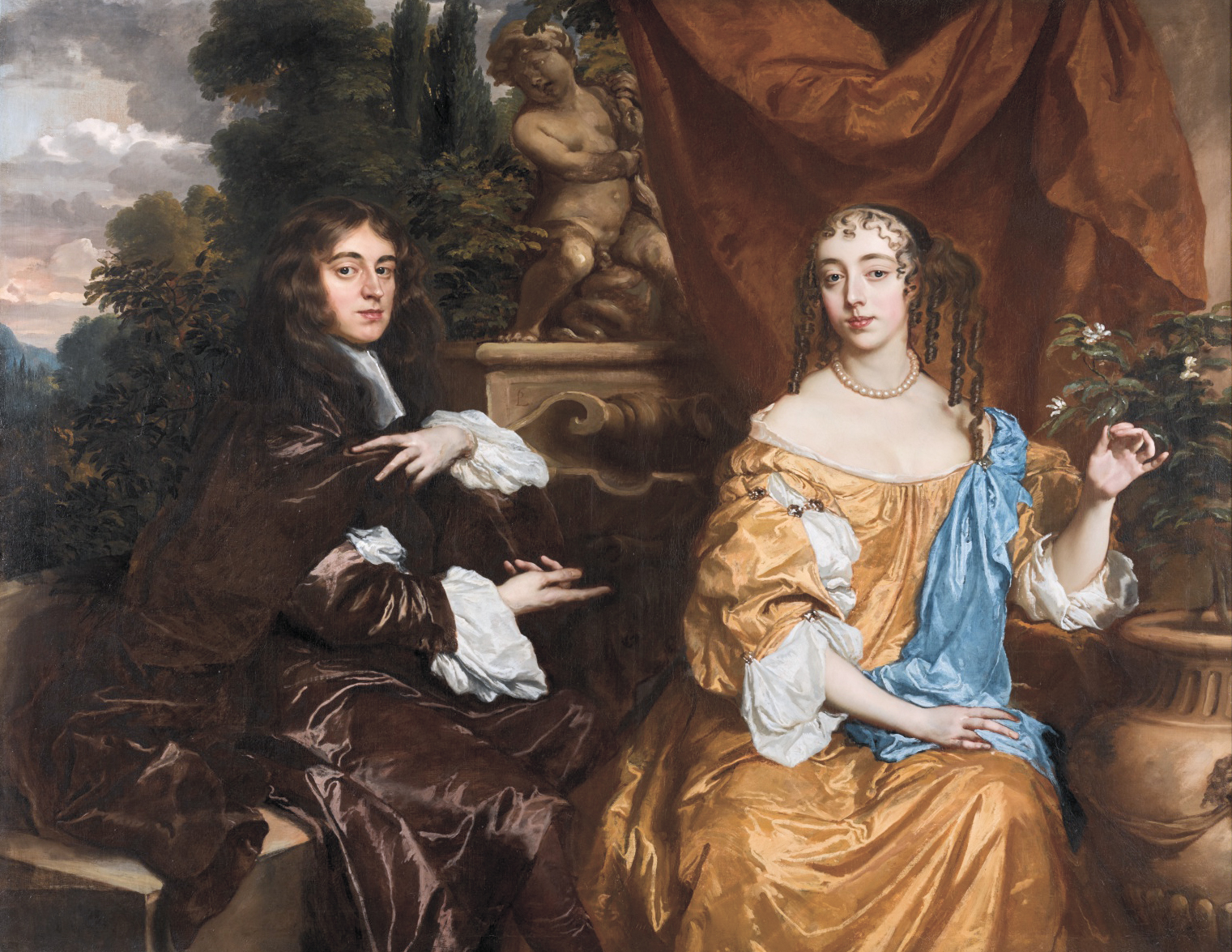
Hyde's parents: Henry Hyde, Viscount Cornbury, later 2nd Earl of Clarendon (1688–1709) and his wife, Theodosia Capel, Viscountess Cornbury, by Peter Lely

The Hyde family had close ties to the monarchy: Edward's grandfather, also named Edward, was the 1st Earl of Clarendon (1609–1674). He was born a commoner but became an important advisor to King Charles I (after 1641) and to Charles II (after 1651). He was best known for negotiating the Restoration of the English Monarchy in 1660 through a series of provisions known as the Clarendon Code. The same year Charles II regained the throne, Clarendon's daughter, Anne Hyde (1637–1671), married the new king's younger brother & heir, James, Duke of York. Meanwhile, Clarendon's eldest son, Henry, married into the Capells of Hadham, one of the richest families in England. Edward's aunt Anne, Duchess of York was the mother of two English Queens, Mary II and Anne.

At age 13, Edward matriculated at Christ Church, Oxford on 23 January 1675. Only a year earlier he had inherited the title Viscount Cornbury when his father succeeded as 2nd Earl of Clarendon. Oxford was followed by three years at l'Academie de Calvin in Geneva.

== Military service ==
After graduation, Lord Cornbury joined the elite Royal Regiment of Dragoons under the command of John Churchill, the future Duke of Marlborough. He became lieutenant colonel in 1683. He was stationed in Vienna by the beginning of 1685, protecting the city from the Ottoman Empire. Cornbury first rose to prominence later that year, due to a struggle for the throne set in motion by King Charles II's death on 6 February 1685. James II was the legitimate heir, but he was a staunch Catholic. His nephew, James Fitzroy, the Duke of Monmouth, was illegitimate but a Protestant. On 11 June 1685, Monmouth landed in England hoping to gather popular support for his claim to the throne, triggering the Monmouth Rebellion.

In response, King James II appointed John Churchill as second in command of the Royalist armies, while Lord Cornbury was promoted to command the Royal Dragoons. The rebellion was quickly crushed, with the Royal Dragoons playing a prominent role. As a reward for his service, Cornbury was given a seat in the Loyal Parliament of 1685. (Note: See Wiltshire County section of The History of Parliament: the House of Commons 1660–1690, ed. B. D. Henning, (1983) and 1690–1715, ed. D. Hayton, E. Cruickshanks, S. Handley, 2002 (Found at http://www.historyofparliamentonline.org/ Archived 7 November 2022 at the Wayback Machine ) These accounts detail the political manoeuvring that led to Cornbury's election.)He continued to distinguish himself, and was a member of parliament for Wiltshire until 1695, and for Christchurch from 1695 until 1701. He earnt the role of Master of the Horse to the King of Denmark in 1685.

=== Glorious Revolution ===
Cornbury played a crucial role in the Glorious Rebellion, becoming the first English officer to defect to the invading William III of Orange. The rebellion originated on 18 June 1688, when prominent English nobles (the "Immortal Seven") sent a letter to William III of Orange requesting his intervention in English politics on the Protestant side. In response, William arrived in Brixham, in southwest England on 5 November with over 450 ships, 15,000–18,000 men, and 3,660 cavalry.

Cornbury's Dragoons was the first royalist unit to make contact with the invasion force – without engaging. A small skirmish was fought at Sherborne on 20 November, but shortly thereafter Lord Cornbury defected to William's side, bringing many of his dragoons with him. Four days later on 24 November Cornbury's mentor, Lord Churchill, also switched sides. Though a relatively small number of Cornbury's men defected with him, accounts range from a low of 27 to a high of 100, the effect of Cornbury and Churchill's actions were devastating to Loyalist morale, and rumours spread that the entirety of their regiments had defected with them. His father despaired at hearing his son was a rebel, but would eventually help negotiate between James and William.

By late December James had disbanded his army and fled to France. With James gone, Parliament debated whether William would rule as King in his own right, or as Queen Mary's consort. Lord Cornbury argued for placing his cousin Anne next in succession after Mary, bypassing William. In the end, Parliament favoured William, who viewed Cornbury's support of Anne as disloyal, and reneged on his battlefield vow that he would never forget Cornbury's service. He punished Cornbury by dismissing him from his regiment on 17 July 1689, and from his ceremonial post as Master of Horse in May 1690.

=== Post Revolution ===
Cornbury now found himself and his family without income and in increasing debt. As a noble, he could not simply get a job, he would need to find income through royal or political means. He struggled to get by from 1690 through 1698. However, he continued to represent parliament, and his political support of William paid off in multiple ways. In 1698, William agreed to pay £10 a week (equal to £1,490 today) to Cornbury, easing his financial burdens. In the spring of 1701, William rewarded Cornbury's continued support and service and appointed Cornbury as Governor of New York.

William died before Cornbury become governor, and the crown went to Queen Mary II's younger sister, Anne. Cornbury's support of her for the throne in the Glorious Revolution, combined with being her first cousin, served Cornbury well. Anne continued to support Cornbury, and would reward him generously on his return from the governorship.

== Governor of New York and New Jersey ==
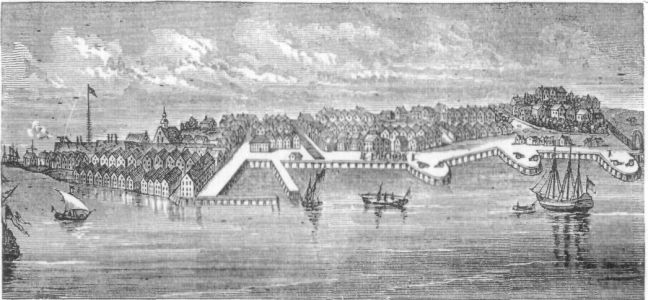
New York 1700

Lord Cornbury arrived in New York on 3 May 1702, to begin his governorship and was graciously welcomed by the local aristocracy. Hyde assumed the governorship amidst Queen Anne's War, which threatened the colonies. When Lord Cornbury was appointed governor, he was also made "captain-general of all forces by sea and land" for all colonies north of Virginia. Upon arrival, the new governor inspected the colony's ring of defensive forts and found them in total disrepair, with the key defensive fort at Albany essentially unusable. (Note: See Reynolds (1906) page 157 for the previous governor's (Earl of Bellomont) report of the conditions at Albany in 1700.) In August 1703, the newly formed Province of New Jersey was added to Cornbury's responsibilities by Queen Anne.

The governor immediately dismissed Colonel Wolfgang William Römer, the imperial engineer who had responsibility for maintaining the forts. He then assumed direct oversight over a vast project to construct a large fortress ringed with stone ramparts (later named Fort Frederick). In August 1702, Governor Cornbury toured the site with representatives of the Iroquois Five Nations. In a report to the Lords of Trade dated 18 June 1703, Imperial Inspector Colonel Robert Quary reported on the construction of the forts:

My Lord Cornbury hath laid the foundation of a stone fort at Albany, and hath carried it on a great way. It will be very regular and answer the end. … [The fortifications give] great satisfaction to our Indians, who lay the great stress of their security on the defence of those forts.

Invasion by sea was the other threat to New York. The approaches to New York harbour were fortified by a rebuilt Fort William Henry on the tip of Manhattan Island, in addition to a line of forts and stockades on both banks of the Hudson River (Note: Known at the time as the North River) as far as the East River. A breastwork with cannon lined the island's riverbanks. Some of the cannon had been commandeered from ships in the harbour. Fears of attack from the sea were realised on 26 July 1706, when the French 16-gun brig Queen Anne suddenly appeared off Sandy Hook at the harbour entrance. Rumours quickly spread that 10 more ships were on the way from the Virginia Capes.

The resulting panic was magnified by the fact that fortifications at the Narrows were as yet incomplete. The local populace rushed to the site and quickly dug defensive embankments. The French ship sailed away without attacking, and the approaching fleet turned out to be 10 ships that had been captured from the French. In 1703, the New York Assembly had assigned Mayor William Peartree to raise £1500 to complete the project. However, blame was quickly shifted to Governor Cornbury, with accusations of embezzlement. The charge prompted the New York Assembly to cut off funding to the governor and manage the colonial budget directly. No French or native incursions into New York Colony occurred throughout the 11-year war.

=== Religious issues and politics ===
Despite an Anglican minority, Governor Cornbury was determined to secure the Church of England as the state religion in the colonies. He was shocked to discover that public funds had been used to build and maintain a Presbyterian church in the village of Jamaica on Long Island. On 4 July 1704, the church, parsonage, and associated buildings were confiscated for use by the Anglican Church.

Cornbury's most notorious religious scandal involved Reverend Francis Makemie (1658–1708), the "Father of American Presbyterianism". During 1683–1706, the minister established the first Presbyterian congregations in America, primarily in Maryland, Virginia, and Pennsylvania. While passing through New York in January 1707, Reverend Makemie led a worship service in a private home. During the service, he performed an infant baptism. In doing so, he violated several English laws prohibiting the practice of "dissenter" religions.

It was a time of increased tension: the Acts of Union (1706 & 1707) had just united England and Scotland under a single government. Most Scots vehemently disapproved of the change, Presbyterians in particular. Rumours circulated about dissenter groups plotting subversion, riot or revolution. High Tories like Cornbury rallied to the cry of "The Church in Danger" – the supposed threat posed by Whigs and Nonconformists. Governor Cornbury duly arrested the visiting minister for preaching without a license. Seven weeks later Makemie faced trial by the Supreme Court of New York and was acquitted. Furious, the governor ordered the minister to pay all expenses for the trial.

During this period Cornbury found himself at odds with the Lewis Morris (1671–1746), then a member of the New Jersey Provincial Council and eventual rival of Cornbury. Cornbury responded by suspending Morris from the upper house in September 1704. Morris apologised to the governor and was reinstated, but in December 1704 Cornbury suspended him again.

Meanwhile, the Anglican Church prospered. Trinity Church, the first meetinghouse in New York, had opened for worship on 3 Mar 1698. In 1705, Governor Cornbury and Lewis Morris – despite the animosity between the two – arranged to add 215 acres from Morris's holdings, known as The Queen's Farm, to the Trinity Church holdings. The site was earmarked for a new college, which was finally founded in 1754 as King's College. On 1 May 1784 the name was changed to Columbia University. Columbia University denies having ties to the former governor:

Edward Hyde, Viscount Cornbury (1661–1723), could very well have been known as the pre-founder of King's College. He was an advocate for the placement of a college in New York City, but somehow his suggestions were overshadowed by Colonel Lewis Morris' statements on the matter, as Morris is more famously known as the college's pre-founder. Although documents lead to evidence of Cornbury's support of the college, his involvement with the college's founding has been ignored because of his damaged reputation over the years.

The first street in New York was paved, with sidewalks installed in 1648 by Anneke Lockermans Van Cortland, when the city was still New Amsterdam. This set the tone for the English to follow. During the second half of Cornbury's term, the streets and sidewalks were paved with cobblestone (in the area around Trinity Church), fire-buckets were positioned throughout the town, and a fledgling fire department was created with two hooks and eight ladders.

=== End of governorship ===
Meanwhile, in New York, Tory Governor Cornbury had become another casualty of the Whig revolution (he was recalled in June 1708). The cabinet believed that he had been too passive militarily. It also seemed unlikely that he would be able to procure the necessary funding from the contentious colonial assembly.

== Post-governorship ==
In December 1708, he was put under house arrest by the sheriff of New York City for outstanding debts. Since 1705, both the New York and New Jersey Assemblies had refused to appropriate funds for the governor's salary and support of the colonial garrison. Both were forced to survive on borrowed funds, which had led to Cornbury accruing large debts. As a result, the ex-governor was still in town to welcome his successor, John Lovelace, Baron of Hurley (who arrived on 18 December 1708). Unfortunately, the new governor died five months later. Administration of the colony then fell to Richard Ingoldsby, who had been Cornbury's Lieutenant Governor and avid supporter. Thus colonial policy continued unchanged. Colonists continued to beg for Cornbury's intervention in local affairs for at least another decade. After a series of acting governors, General Robert Hunter arrived in 1710 to fill the post permanently. He served until 1720.

Cornbury's fortunes found reversal soon after his recall as governor. His father's death elevated him to the Peerage, and with it, Parliamentary immunity against civil actions, thus rescuing him from debtors' prison (31 Oct 1709). Upon his return to England, the queen awarded him a pension and lodging at Somerset House, one of the royal palaces. He joined the Harley Ministry as first commissioner of the admiralty in December 1711.

Although a member of Harley's cabinet, Cornbury was able to remain untainted by the series of scandals that rocked the Tory leadership during this period: His old mentor, the Duke of Marlborough was removed from his place as Captain-General (29 December 1711), charged with bribery and embezzlement. Several "High Tories" were implicated in the Jacobite rising of 1715, which supported James Francis Edward Stuart as the pretender to the throne. Cornbury was apparently not linked to Robert Harley (1st Earl of Oxford)'s South Seas Bubble, which caused the ruin and bankruptcy of many aristocrats and office holders in 1720–1721.

=== Special emissary to Hanover and death ===
Amid political turmoil, Queen Anne sent Cornbury as a replacement for Harley's emissary to her successor, George, Elector of Hannover (1660–1727; King 1714–1727). From his arrival in August 1714 until the Queen's death in November, Cornbury dined and spent his evenings with the royal family. "My Lord Clarendon is very much approved of at Court", wrote his secretary, John Gay.

Once King George I assumed the British throne following the Hanoverian Succession, his animosity toward the Tories became apparent, and Cornbury lost his position as an emissary. Cornbury continued to be active in the House of Lords until about 1720. When he died on 31 March 1723 at Chelsea, London, his death received little notice. He is interred in the Henry VII chapel in Westminster Abbey, in the Hyde family crypt.

== Conduct in office ==
Hyde has maintained a scandalous reputation for much of history, known for being highly corrupt and being an easy caricature of the wrongs and incompetence that American colonists perceived came as a result of being under British colonial rule.

Shelly Ross, an author and journalist, agreed with this viewpoint and saw Cornbury as corrupt, in both moral and governmental terms. Ross wrote that Cornbury's alleged misconduct helped to start the American Revolution, and that framers of the constitution had Lord Cornbury in mind when they wrote the articles of impeachment.

The only modern biography that focuses solely on Hyde was written by New York University professor Patricia Bonomi in 1998 and takes a more nuanced view of Cornbury.

=== Alleged cross-dressing ===
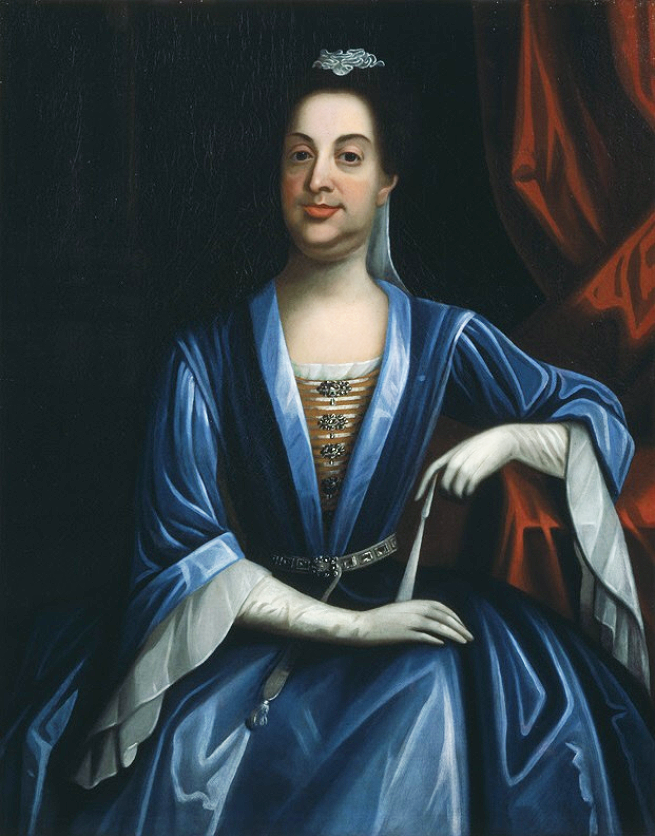
Portrait of an unknown person, purported by some to be Lord Cornbury, held by the New-York Historical Society and reflecting allegations of Cornbury's cross-dressing

Lord Cornbury was alleged to have opened the 1702 New York Assembly in female clothing. He was dressed in a "hooped gown and elaborate headdress and carrying a fan, much in the style of the fashionable Queen Anne."

Ross, writing in 1988, called him a transvestite and takes his cross-dressing as fact. However, Bonomi (1998) concluded that he was not a crossdresser, because a royal governor probably could not have publicly cross-dressed without severe censure. Bonomi further states that the contemporary descriptions of Cornbury do not comport with his being a transvestite, either homosexual or heterosexual, but that the sporadic nature of his alleged cross-dressing would place him at the more heterosexual end of the "broad middle category of transvestites", especially because the "evidence regarding Cornbury's personal life is devoid of any of the traits of transgenderism or transexualism that occupy the rest of this category." Bonomi writes that it is possible to speculate that "his attachment to the military and to manly honor was a way of compensating for an incompletely developed masculine identity." Or his transvestitic fetish, if he had one, and the guilt and psychological distress it caused might have found outlet in his alleged rages. Bonomi speculates that this fetish may have intensified after the death of his wife, emboldening him to attempt to "pass" as a woman in public.

Bonomi concludes that Lord Cornbury's crossdressing was likely invented by his political enemies as character assassination. (Note: As opposed to a physical assassination, as happened in 1710 to Daniel Parke, Governor of the British West Indian Leeward Islands.) (Note: For further sources on the question of Cornbury's alleged cross-dressing, see Katz, Jonathan Ned (1992) Gay American History: Lesbians & Gay Men in the U.S.A. p.570 n.23 New York: Meridian. ISBN 0-452-01092-6)

=== Monetary corruption ===
According to Ross, Cornbury dispensed thousands of state acres in a corrupt fashion. The most solid evidence of misappropriation of land by Lord Cornbury came in 1706, when he granted a swath of government land south of Albany to nine friends of his, including his secretary. The grant, which included part of the Great Nine Partners Patent, was probably illegal and was made by Hyde for cash. The land later became Hyde Park (named for Lord Cornbury), the home of Franklin D. Roosevelt.

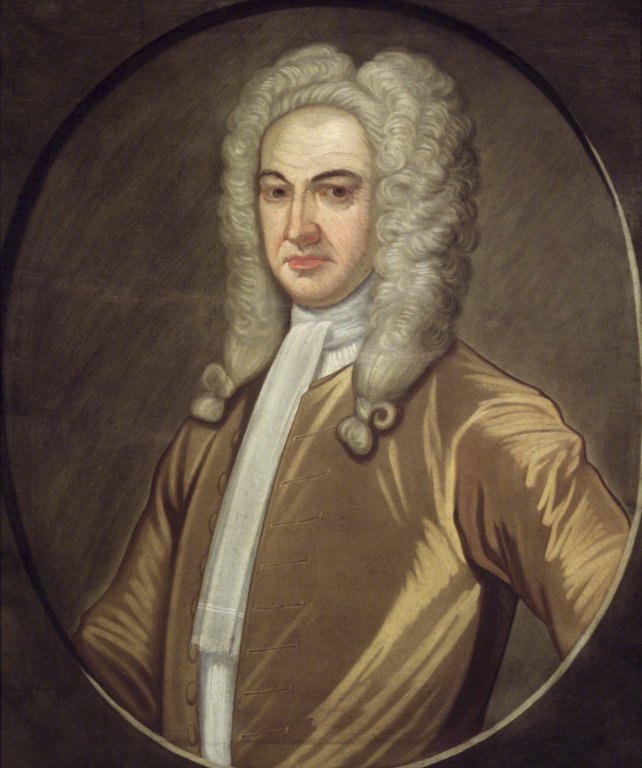
Lewis Morris, eventual Governor of New Jersey and political rival of Lord Cornbury

Virtually every reference written about Lord Cornbury has described him in disparaging terms. The criticisms can be traced to a complaint, written in the spring of 1706, to the newly appointed Whig ministry by Lewis Morris (1671–1746), and Samuel Jennings (about 1660–1708) in behalf of the New Jersey Assembly. In 1708, the New York Assembly followed suit with their letter. Specific accusations included:

- Asserting royal prerogative over locally elected assemblies
- Accepting bribes
- Persecution of the Presbyterians by confiscating church property and imprisoning their ministers
- Embezzlement of defense funds
- Fiscal mismanagement, leading to a large amount of public & personal debt

Such complaints were common then. Similar allegations were made about the royal governors who preceded and succeeded Cornbury, in New York, New Jersey, and other colonies. What was unique about Governor Cornbury was the allegation of wearing women's clothes.

A generation later, the story was told of a conversation about Lord Cornbury between Horace Walpole (1717–1797, a famous Whig minister and author) and George James Williams (1719–1805, an author). Walpole recounted:

[Lord Cornbury] was a clever man. His great insanity was dressing himself as a woman. When Governor in America he opened the Assembly dressed in that fashion. When some of those about him remonstrated, his reply was, 'You are very stupid not to see the propriety of it. In this place and particularly on this occasion I represent a woman (Queen Anne) and ought in all respects to represent her as faithfully as I can.'

Williams's reported reply:

My father did business with Cornbury in woman's clothes. He used to sit at the open window so dressed, to the great amusement of the neighbours. He employed always the most fashionable milliner, shoemaker, stay maker, etc. I saw a picture of him at Sir Herbert Packington's in Worcestershire, in a gown, stays, tucker, long ruffles, and cap....

== Family ==
Lord Cornbury eloped with Katherine O'Brien, the 8th Baroness Clifton on 10 July 1685. She was the daughter of Henry O'Brien, Lord Ibrackan, 7th Earl of Thomond. Lady Cornbury died at the age of 43 in New York on 11 August 1706 and was buried at Trinity Church, New York.

Children:

- Catherine Hyde (died young)
- Mary Flora Hyde (died 1697)
- Edward Hyde, Viscount Cornbury & 9th Baron Clifton (1691 – February 1713); died unmarried at age 22 due to fever.
- Theodosia Hyde, 10th Baroness Clifton (9 November 1695 – 30 July 1722). Married August 1713 to John Bligh, 1st Earl of Darnley (1687–1728). Died of sepsis at age 26 shortly after the birth of her 7th child.

=== Portrait ===
No confirmed contemporary portraits of Cornbury exist. An uncaptioned 18th-century portrait that hangs in the New-York Historical Society has been commonly believed to be Governor Cornbury wearing a dress. Professor Bonomi suggested that the subject was not Cornbury. However, other art historians have remained unconvinced. The New-York Historical Society posits that, whether or not the disputed subject of the painting is Cornbury, the controversy represents "an historically early discussion of gender cross-dressing."

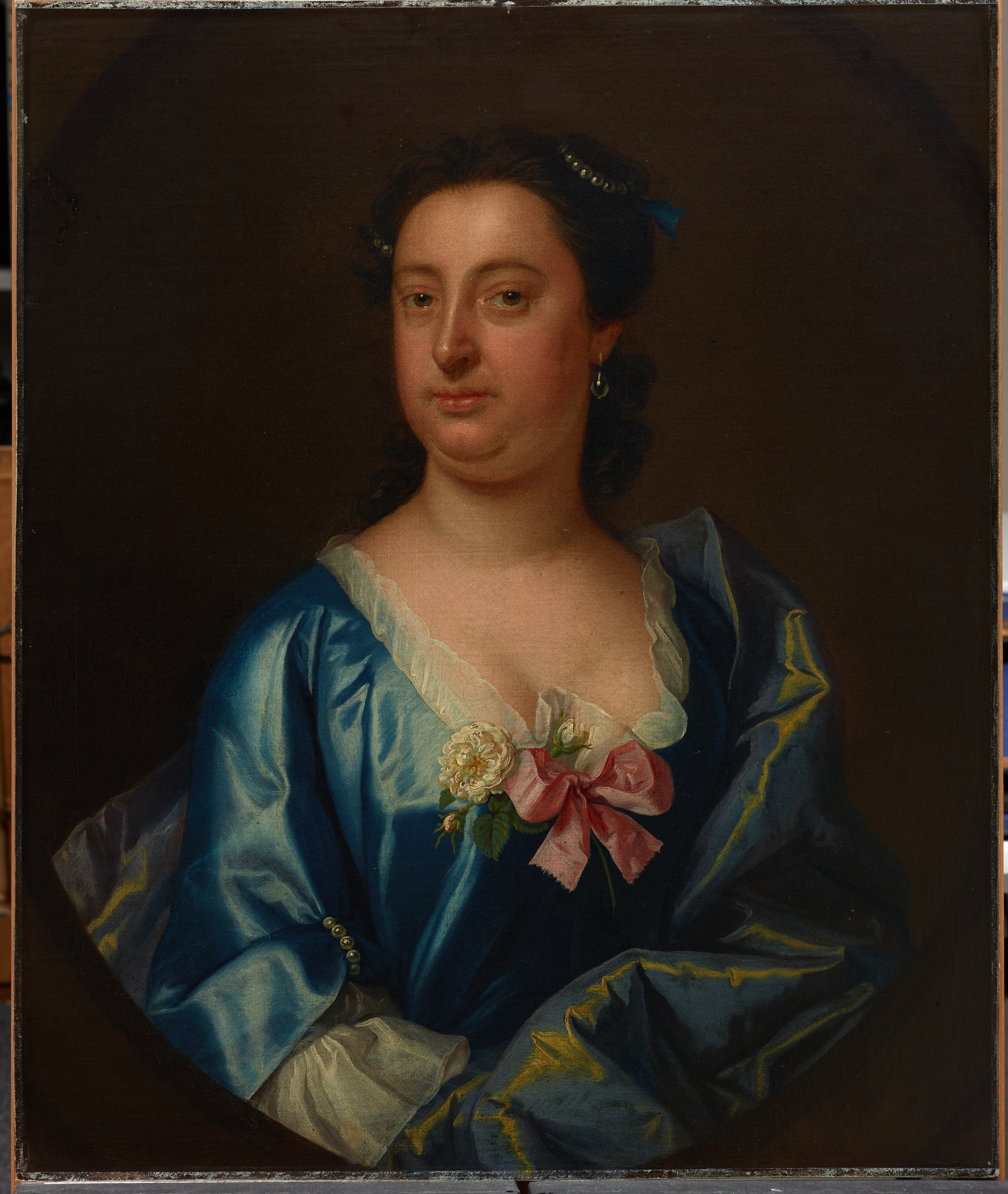
An alleged portrait of Lord Cornbury, wearing a dress. Artist unknown, painted sometime between 1705 and 1750. Lord Cornbury died in the 1720s, making it possible the portrait was posthumous. It resembles a similar portrait that hangs in the New-York Historical Society.

The Dallas Museum of Art has a different portrait of unknown provenance also ascribed to be Lord Cornbury in a Dress, painted sometime between 1705 and 1750.

== In popular culture ==
Androboros ["man-eater" in corrupted Greek], a play by Robert Hunter, Cornbury's successor as Governor of New York (1710–1719) was a satire that ridiculed prominent New York citizens, including Lord Cornbury (as "Lord Oinobaros" ["heavy with wine"]). Crossdressing was a central theme in the play. It was one of the first plays written and published in Britain's American colonies. It was recently revived by the Peculiar Works Project of New York City on 4–6 November 2016, under the direction of Ralph Lewis.

Cornbury appears in James Fenimore Cooper's novel, "The Water-Witch, or The Skimmer of the Seas," written in 1830, as a corrupt colonial governor who has been imprisoned in New York for his financial improprieties.

Cornbury was the lead character in the play Cornbury: The Queen's Governor – first presented as a staged reading at The Public Theater on 12 April 1976, the play was written by William M. Hoffman and Anthony Holland. Joseph Papp produced and Holland directed, with Joseph Maher in the role of Cornbury. The play was revived in 2009 at the Hudson Guild Theater under the direction of Tim Cusack. David Greenspan played Cornbury.

He also made appearances in Edward Rutherfurd's historical saga novel New York, in Daniel Pinkwater's "The Adventures of a Cat-Whiskered Girl", and in Robert McCammon's "Matthew Corbett" series of novels.

Parliament of England
Preceded by Thomas Thynne; Sir Walter St John, Bt	Member of parliament for Wiltshire; 1685–1695; With: Viscount Bruce 1685–1689; Sir Thomas Mompesson 1689–1690; Sir Walter St John, Bt 1690–1695	Succeeded by Sir George Hungerford; Henry St John
Preceded by Francis Gwyn; William Ettrick	Member of Parliament for Christchurch; 1695–1701; With: William Ettrick	Succeeded by William Ettrick; Francis Gwyn
Military offices
Preceded by The Lord Churchill	Colonel of The King's Own Royal Regiment of Dragoons; 1685–1688	Succeeded by Robert Clifford
Preceded by Robert Clifford	Colonel of The King's Own Royal Regiment of Dragoons; 1688–1689	Succeeded by Anthony Heyford
Government offices
Preceded by Andrew Hamilton as governor of East Jersey and West Jersey	Governor of the Province of New Jersey; 1702–1708	Succeeded by Lord Lovelace
Preceded by John Nanfan as acting governor	Governor of the Province of New York; 1702–1708	Succeeded by Lord Lovelace
Diplomatic posts
Preceded by Isaac d'Alais	British Envoy to Hanover; 1714	Post abolished Personal union between Great Britain and Hanover
Peerage of England
Preceded by Henry Hyde	Earl of Clarendon; 1709–1723	Succeeded by Henry Hyde
