= John Bligh, 1st Earl of Darnley =

Irish peer (1687–1728)

The Right Honourable The Earl of Darnley
- John Bligh, 1st Earl of Darnley, c.1723

Member of the Irish House of Commons for Athboy
- In office 1713–1721
- Preceded by: Robert Johnson (1682–1721)
- Succeeded by: Richard Ashe

Member of the Irish House of Commons for Trim
- In office 1709–1713
- Preceded by: William Napper
- Succeeded by: Thomas Jones

Personal details
- Born: John Bligh; 28 December 1687
- Died: 12 September 1728 (aged 40)
- Spouse: Theodosia Hyde, 10th Baroness Clifton (m. 1713; died 1722)
- Relations: Thomas Bligh (brother); Robert Bligh (brother); John Bligh, 4th Earl of Darnley (grandson); Theodosia Blachford (granddaughter); Theodosia Meade, Countess of Clanwilliam (granddaughter); John Crosbie, 2nd Earl of Glandore (grandson); Nicholas Ward, 2nd Viscount Bangor (grandson)
- Children: 7, including Edward, John
- Parent(s): Thomas Bligh; Elizabeth Napier

John Bligh, 1st Earl of Darnley (28 December 1687 – 12 September 1728), was an Irish peer born of an English family.

== Early life ==
He was the son of Elizabeth (née Napier) Bligh and Thomas Bligh (1654–1710) of Plymouth, a Commissioner of Customs and Excise despatched to Ireland in search of forfeited estates who was appointed to the Privy Council of Ireland around November 1706. His younger brothers were Lt.-Gen. Thomas Bligh, best known for his service during the Seven Years' War, and the Very Rev. Robert Bligh, the Dean of Elphin.

His paternal grandfather was William Bligh, a prosperous Plymouth merchant, and his maternal grandfather was Col. James Napier of Loughcrew. He was descended from a prominent Devon family via a cadet branch which had settled in County Meath, Ireland.

== Career ==
From 1709 to 1713, Bligh represented Trim in the Irish House of Commons, after which he represented Athboy from 1713 to 1721.

In 1721, he was raised to the Peerage of Ireland as Baron Clifton of Rathmore, in the County of Meath. In 1723, the Darnley title held by his wife's ancestors (which had become extinct on the death of Charles Stewart, 6th Duke of Lennox and 6th Earl of Darnley in 1672) was revived when he was created Viscount Darnley, of Athboy in the County of Meath, in the Peerage of Ireland. In 1725, Bligh was further honoured when he was advanced as Earl of Darnley (a reference to his wife's ancestors, the Stewarts of Darnley of Cobham), in the County of Meath, also in the Peerage of Ireland.

== Personal life ==
On 24 August 1713, he was married to Lady Theodosia Hyde, 10th Baroness Clifton of Leighton Bromswold (1695–1722), a daughter of Edward Hyde, Viscount Cornbury, 3rd Earl of Clarendon and the former Catherine O'Brien of Cobham Hall, suo jure Baroness Clifton of Leighton Bromswold (a granddaughter of George, 9th Seigneur d'Aubigny and niece of Charles, 6th Duke of Lennox). Together, they were the parents of seven children, five of whom lived to adulthood:

- Lady Ann Bligh (1718–1789), who married Robert Hawkins-Magill of Gill Hall in 1742. After his death in 1745, she married Bernard Ward, 1st Viscount Bangor, in 1747.
- Lady Theodosia Bligh (1710–1777), who married, as his first wife, William Crosbie, 1st Earl of Glandore, in 1745.
- Lady Mary Bligh (b. 1711), who died in infancy.
- Hon. George Bligh (b. 1714), who died in infancy.
- Edward Bligh, 2nd Earl of Darnley (1715–1747), who died unmarried in 1747, aged 31.
- Lady Mary Bligh (1716–1748), who married William Tighe MP, of Rosanna, County Wicklow, in 1736.
- John Bligh, 3rd Earl of Darnley (1719–1781), who also represented Athboy in the Irish House of Commons and Maidstone in the British House of Commons; he married Mary Stoyte, daughter and heiress of John Stoyte and Mary (née Howard) Stoyte (sister of Ralph Howard, 1st Viscount Wicklow and eldest daughter of Rt. Rev. Robert Howard, Bishop of Elphin), in 1766.

Lord Darnley died in 1728 and was buried with his wife in the "Hyde Vault" in Westminster Abbey, in the north ambulatory, near the steps up to Henry VII's chapel. Upon his death, he was succeeded by his eldest surviving son, the second Earl. He had already succeeded his mother in 1722 as the 11th Baron Clifton of Leighton Bromswold in the Peerage of England. The second Earl served as a Lord of the Bedchamber to Frederick, Prince of Wales, but died unmarried in 1747, aged 31. He was succeeded by his younger brother, the third Earl. On his death the titles passed to his eldest son, the fourth Earl.

=== Descendants ===
Through his daughter, Lady Mary, he was a grandfather of the Irish philanthropist, Theodosia (née Tighe) Blachford (1744–1817) (the wife of Rev. William Blachford, prebendary to Tassasagar, and mother of Anglo-Irish poet Mary (née Blanchford) Tighe).

Through his daughter Lady Ann, he was a grandfather of Theodosia Hawkins-Magill (1743–1817) (the wife of John Meade, 1st Earl of Clanwilliam), Nicholas Ward, 2nd Viscount Bangor (1750–1827), Hon. Edward Ward (1753–1812), and Hon. Robert Ward (1754–1831).

Peerage of Ireland
New creation	Earl of Darnley; 1725–1728	Succeeded by Edward Bligh
