= Bly, Missouri =

Extinct hamlet in Missouri, U.S.

Coordinates: 36°34′21″N 92°03′31″W

Bly is an extinct town in southwest Howell County, in the Ozarks of southern Missouri. The location is on Bennetts Bayou, approximately 3.5 miles southeast of Caulfield.

Bly was named after the horse of an early settler. A post office called Bly was established in 1887, and remained in operation until 1923. In the 1920s, the community was ruined by fire.
