= Athboy (Parliament of Ireland constituency) =

Pre-1801 Irish constituency

- Former borough constituency for the Irish House of Commons
- County: County Meath
- Borough: Athboy

1613–1801
- Replaced by: Disfranchised

Athboy was a constituency in County Meath represented in the Irish House of Commons until 1800.

== History ==
In the Patriot Parliament of 1689 summoned by King James II, Athboy was represented with two members.

== Members of Parliament, 1560–1801 ==
Election	First MP	Second MP
1560	Michael Moore	James Blake
1585	William Browne	Patrick Terrell
1613	Richard Browne	Melchior Moore
1634	Richard Browne	Peter Terrell
1639	Richard Browne (died and replaced 1642 by Francis Paisley)	Walter Dowdall (died and replaced 1642 by Ralph Wallis)
1661	Sir Richard Reynell, 1st Baronet	John Bligh
1689	John Trinder	Robert Longfield
1692	Thomas Bligh	Peter Westenra
1695	Garret Wesley	James Napper
1703	Robert Johnson	John Wade
1705	Robert Johnson	John Wade
1713	John Bligh	John Wade
1715	John Bligh	Thomas Bligh
1721	Richard Ashe (Note: Also elected for Trim in 1727, for which he chose to sit)	Thomas Bligh
1727	Robert Napper	Thomas Bligh
1739	Hon. John Bligh	Thomas Bligh
1748	William Napper	Thomas Bligh
1761	William Tighe	Thomas Bligh
1775	William Tighe	Hon. John Crosbie (Note: Styled as Viscount Crosbie from 1776)
1776	Edward Tighe	William Chapman
1783	Hugh Howard	Thomas Cherburgh Bligh
1800	Hon. Edward Bligh	Thomas Cherburgh Bligh
1801	Constituency disenfranchised	

== Bibliography ==
- O'Hart, John (2007). The Irish and Anglo-Irish Landed Gentry: When Cromwell came to Ireland. Vol. II. Heritage Books. ISBN 978-0-7884-1927-0.
- Leigh Rayment's historical List of Members of the Irish House of Commons. Cites: Johnston-Liik, Edith Mary (2002). The History of the Irish Parliament 1692-1800 (6 volumes). Ulster Historical Foundation.
