= Lord Lieutenant of Meath =

Ceremonial officer in Meath, Ireland

This is a list of people who served as Lord Lieutenant of County Meath, Ireland.

There were lieutenants of counties in Ireland until the reign of James II, when they were renamed governors. The office of Lord Lieutenant was recreated on 23 August 1831.

== Governors ==
- Jenico Preston, 7th Viscount Gormanston, 1689–1691
- Edward Moore, 5th Earl of Drogheda: c.1748 (died 1758)
- Charles Moore, 1st Marquess of Drogheda, 1759–1822
- Thomas Taylour, 1st Marquess of Headfort, 1823–1829
- Edward Bligh, 5th Earl of Darnley: 1830–1831
- James Naper: –1831
- Sir Marcus Somerville, 4th Baronet: –1831
- Edward Bligh: –1831

== Lord Lieutenants ==
- Edward Bligh, 5th Earl of Darnley: 28 October 1831 – 11 February 1835
- Edward Plunkett, 14th Baron Dunsany: 11 April 1835 – 11 December 1848
- Arthur Plunkett, 9th Earl of Fingall: 10 January 1849 – 21 April 1869
- General Francis Conyngham, 2nd Marquess Conyngham: 31 May 1869 – 17 July 1876
- Thomas Taylour, 3rd Marquess of Headfort: 15 September 1876 – 22 July 1894
- Simon Mangan of Dunboyne Castle: 18 June 1895 – 1906
- Sir Nugent Everard, 1st Baronet: 17 August 1906 – 1922
