= Thomas Bligh (politician, born 1654) =

Irish politician

Thomas Bligh (1654 – 28 August 1710) was an Irish politician.

Bligh was the son of William Bligh, a prosperous merchant of Plymouth. He was educated at Trinity College Dublin.

He was elected to the Irish House of Commons as Member of Parliament for Athboy, from 1692 to 1693, then for County Meath from 1695 to 1699 and 1703 to 1710.

Around November 1706 he was appointed to the Privy Council of Ireland.

== Family ==
On 9 December 1682, he married Elizabeth Napier (died 21 March 1737), daughter of Colonel James Napier, with children including:

- John (28 December 1687 – 12 September 1728), who was created Earl of Darnley
- Thomas (1693 – 1775), who became a Lieutenant-General
- Robert (ca. 1704 – June 1778), who became Dean of Elphin.
- Elizabeth, who married George St George, and was the mother of Sir Richard St George, 1st Baronet.
