= Cobham Hall =

Manor house in Kent, England

Coordinates: 51°23′40″N 0°25′07″E

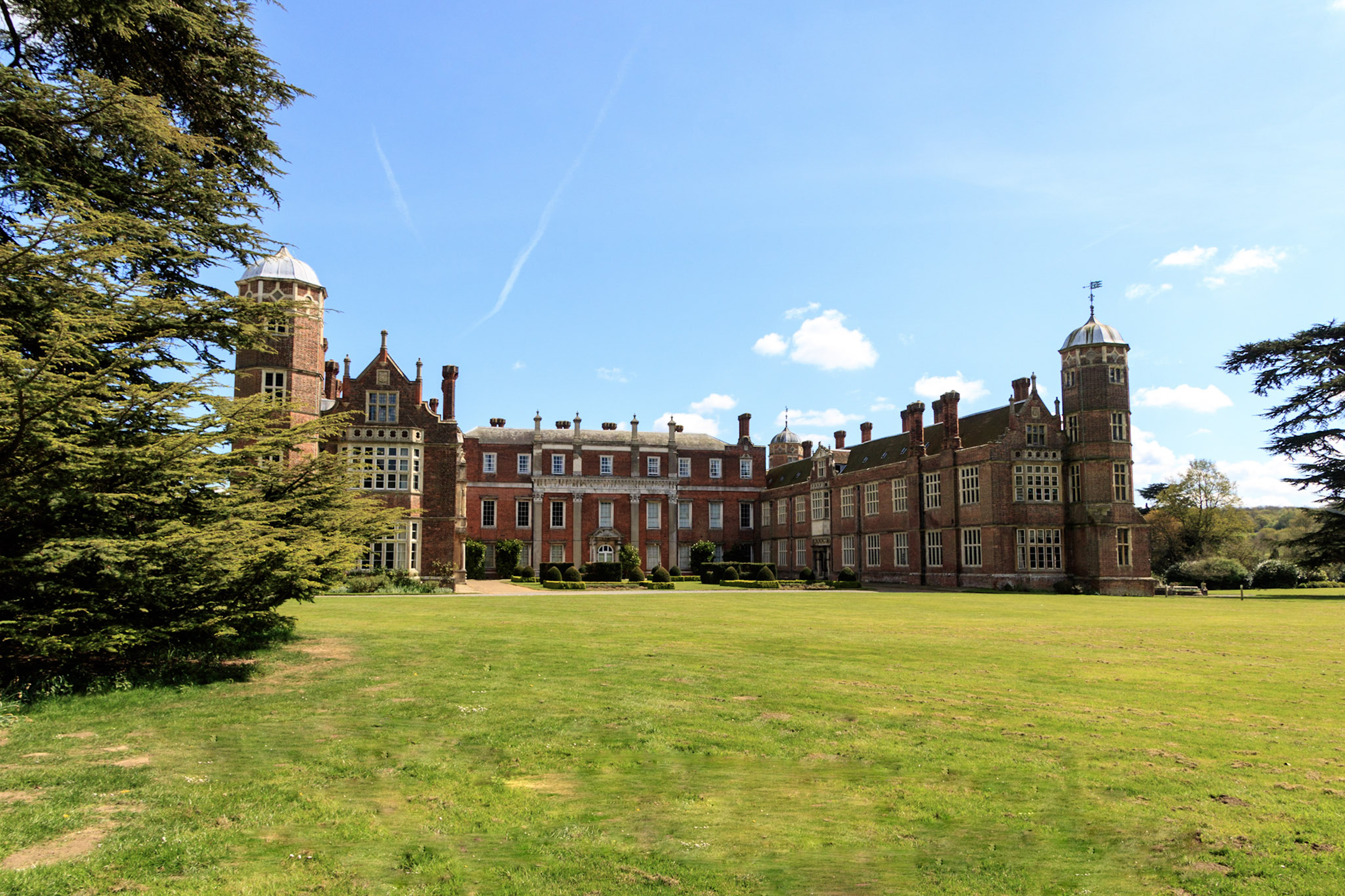
- West Court of Cobham Hall

General information
- Type: Country house
- Architectural style: Tudor; Classical
- Location: Cobham, Kent, England
- Current tenants: Cobham Hall School
- Construction started: 1584
- Completed: 1672
- Renovated: c. 1767–1773; 1770–1781; 1817–1820
- Client: William Brooke, 10th Baron Cobham
- Owner: Cobham Hall School

Technical details
- Grounds: 150 acres (60 ha)

Listed Building – Grade II*
- Official name: Cobham Hall
- Designated: 01 May 1986
- Reference no.: 1000182

Cobham Hall in 1868, and as today; Tudor wings built 1584–91 by William Brooke, 10th Baron Cobham (1527–1597); central block built 1662–72 by Charles Stewart, 3rd Duke of Richmond, 6th Duke of Lennox (1639–1672)

Map of Kent showing location of Cobham Hall and Cooling Castle, seats of Barons Cobham c. 1208 – 1603

Cobham Hall is an English country house in the county of Kent, England. The grade I listed building is one of the largest and most important houses in Kent, re-built as an Elizabethan prodigy house by William Brooke, 10th Baron Cobham (1527–1597). The central block was rebuilt 1672–82 by Charles Stewart, 3rd Duke of Richmond, 6th Duke of Lennox (1639–1672).

Today the building houses Cobham Hall School, a private day and boarding school, established there in 1962, which retains 150 acres (60 ha) of the ancient estate.

The historic dairy, designed by the architect James Wyatt as an eyecatcher, was restored by the Landmark Trust and opened as a holiday destination in 2019.

== Building history ==
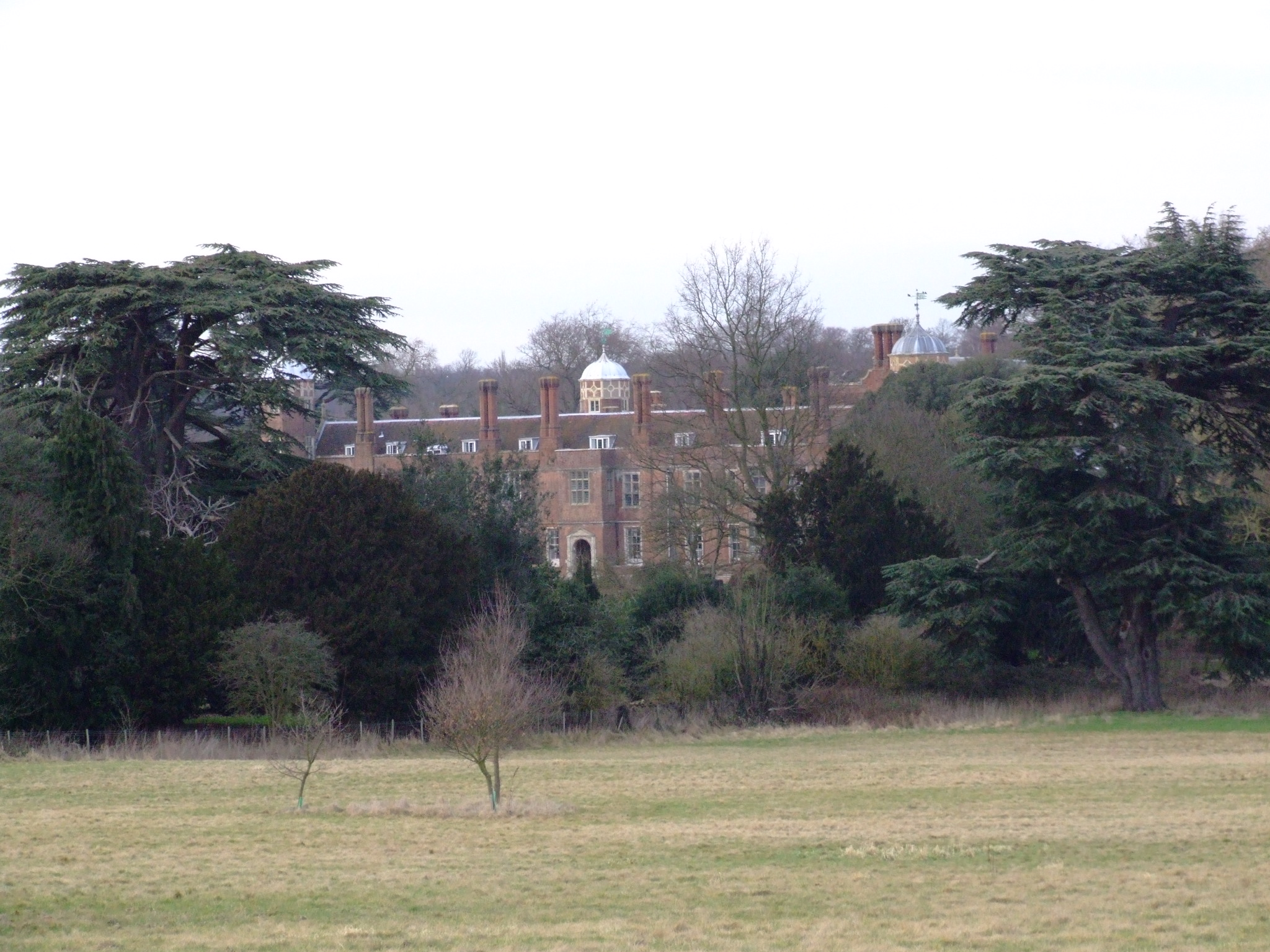
The garden front in 2009

There has been a manor house on the site since the 12th century. The current building consists of a pair of Tudor wings built for William Brooke, 10th Baron Cobham in the 16th century and a later classical central block, the "Cross Wing", remodelled in 1661–63 by Peter Mills of London for Charles Stewart, 3rd Duke of Richmond.

In the 18th century, the hall passed to the Bligh family, later Earls of Darnley. The attic storey was extended and other alterations made for John Bligh, 3rd Earl of Darnley by Sir William Chambers, ca 1767–70 A kitchen court was added to the rear in 1771–73. The most notable feature of the interior is the two-storey Gilt Hall, designed and installed by George Shakespear, master carpenter and architect, of London, who made extensive interior alterations, 1770–81. The organ was built by John Snetzler in 1778–9.

John Bligh, 4th Earl of Darnley, who inherited in 1781, employed James Wyatt extensively, for interiors that included the picture gallery and the dining room, and for stables and a Gothic dairy. The library was fitted up by George Stanley Repton in 1817–20, and with his brother, John Adey Repton, in Jacobethan style, including the ceiling for "Queen Elizabeth's Room" (1817). Their father, Humphry Repton, was hired to design a landscape plan for the estate and completed one of his famous "Red Books" for Cobham in 1790.

During the First World War it was an Australian convalescent hospital. At one point it was led by Matron Mary Anne Pocock who had served in Egypt; she was awarded a second class Royal Red Cross.

The house contained an important art collection formed by the 4th Earl of Darnley from part of the Orleans Collection. However, as the Great depression of British agriculture caused the family's fortune to decline, the collection begun to be sold off with Tintoretto's The Origin of the Milky Way and Four Allegories of Love by Veronese being sold to the National Gallery in 1890. Titian's The Rape of Europa was sold to P & D Colnaghi in 1896; it is now in the Isabella Stewart Gardner Museum. A further portion was sold at Christie's in 1925 and the remainder at Sotheby's in 1957.

Cobham Hall remained the family home of the Earls of Darnley until 1957; it is now home to the school. It is open to the public on a limited number of days each year.

The building has been used as a film set. A scene in Agent Cody Banks 2: Destination London in which Frankie Muniz fights Keith Allen in a room full of priceless treasures was filmed in the Gilt Hall. Scenes from an adaption of Bleak House were also filmed outside the building, and it was also used in a few scenes in the comedy sketch show Tittybangbang. The hall is used as the Abbey Mount school in the 2008 film Wild Child starring Emma Roberts, and as the Foundling Hospital in the CBBC adaptation of Hetty Feather. the hall was used as the haunted home in the 2025 BBC Ghost Story for Christmas, The Room in the Tower.

== Family owners ==
Families who have owned the manor include the Cobham family (Barons of Cobham), the Stewart family (Earls of Lennox), and the Bligh family (Earls of Darnley).
