= John Bligh, 3rd Earl of Darnley =

British parliamentarian (1719-1781)

The Earl of Darnley

Member of Parliament for Maidstone
- In office 1741–1747

Member of Parliament for Athboy
- In office 1739–1747

Personal details
- Born: 1 October 1719
- Died: 31 July 1781 (aged 61)
- Spouse: Mary Stoyte
- Children: 8, including John Bligh, 4th Earl of Darnley, Edward Bligh
- Parents: John Bligh, 1st Earl of Darnley (father); Theodosia Bligh, 10th Baroness Clifton (mother)
- Education: Merton College

Arms of Bligh: Azure, a griffin segreant or armed and langued gules between three crescents argent

John Bligh, 3rd Earl of Darnley (1 October 1719 – 31 July 1781), styled The Honourable John Bligh between 1721 and 1747, lord of the Manor of Cobham, Kent, was a British parliamentarian.

== Background ==
Bligh was the son of John Bligh, 1st Earl of Darnley and Lady Theodosia Hyde, later Baroness Clifton (in her own right). He was born in 1719, near Gravesend, Kent, and at the age of eight was sent to Westminster School. He matriculated at Merton College on 13 May 1735 and was created MA on 13 July 1738.

== Political career ==
Bligh served as Member of Parliament (MP) for Maidstone from 1741 to 1747 and for Athboy in the Irish House of Commons from 1739 to 1747.

== Family ==
Lord Darnley married Mary Stoyte on 11 September 1766. They had seven children:

- John Bligh, 4th Earl of Darnley (30 June 1767 – 17 March 1831)
- General Hon. Edward Bligh (19 September 1769 – 2 November 1840)
- Lady Mary Bligh (d. 4 March 1796), married Sir Lawrence Palk, 2nd Baronet on 7 August 1789, without issue
- Lady Theodosia Bligh (February 1771 – 21 January 1840), married Thomas Cherburgh Bligh, her second cousin once removed, and had issue
- Lady Sarah Bligh (10 February 1772 – April 1797)
- Lady Catherine Bligh (1775 – 11 February 1812), married Charles Vane, 3rd Marquess of Londonderry in 1804 and had issue
- Colonel Hon. William Bligh (25 September 1775 – 8 August 1845), married Lady Sophia Stewart, daughter of John Stewart, 7th Earl of Galloway, and had one daughter Sophia who married Henry William Parnell {1809-1896} in 1835 whose father Henry Parnell, 1st Baron Congleton was a great-uncle of Charles Stewart Parnell.

Parliament of Great Britain
Preceded by Hon. Robert Fairfax; William Horsemonden-Turner	Member of Parliament for Maidstone; 1741–1747; With: Hon. Robert Fairfax	Succeeded by William Horsemonden-Turner; Lord Guernsey
Parliament of Ireland
Preceded by Robert Napper; Thomas Bligh	Member of Parliament for Athboy; 1739–1747; With: Thomas Bligh	Succeeded by William Napper; Thomas Bligh
Peerage of Ireland
Preceded by Edward Bligh	Earl of Darnley; 1747–1781	Succeeded by John Bligh
