= John Bligh, 4th Earl of Darnley =

British peer and cricketer

The Right Honourable The Earl of Darnley
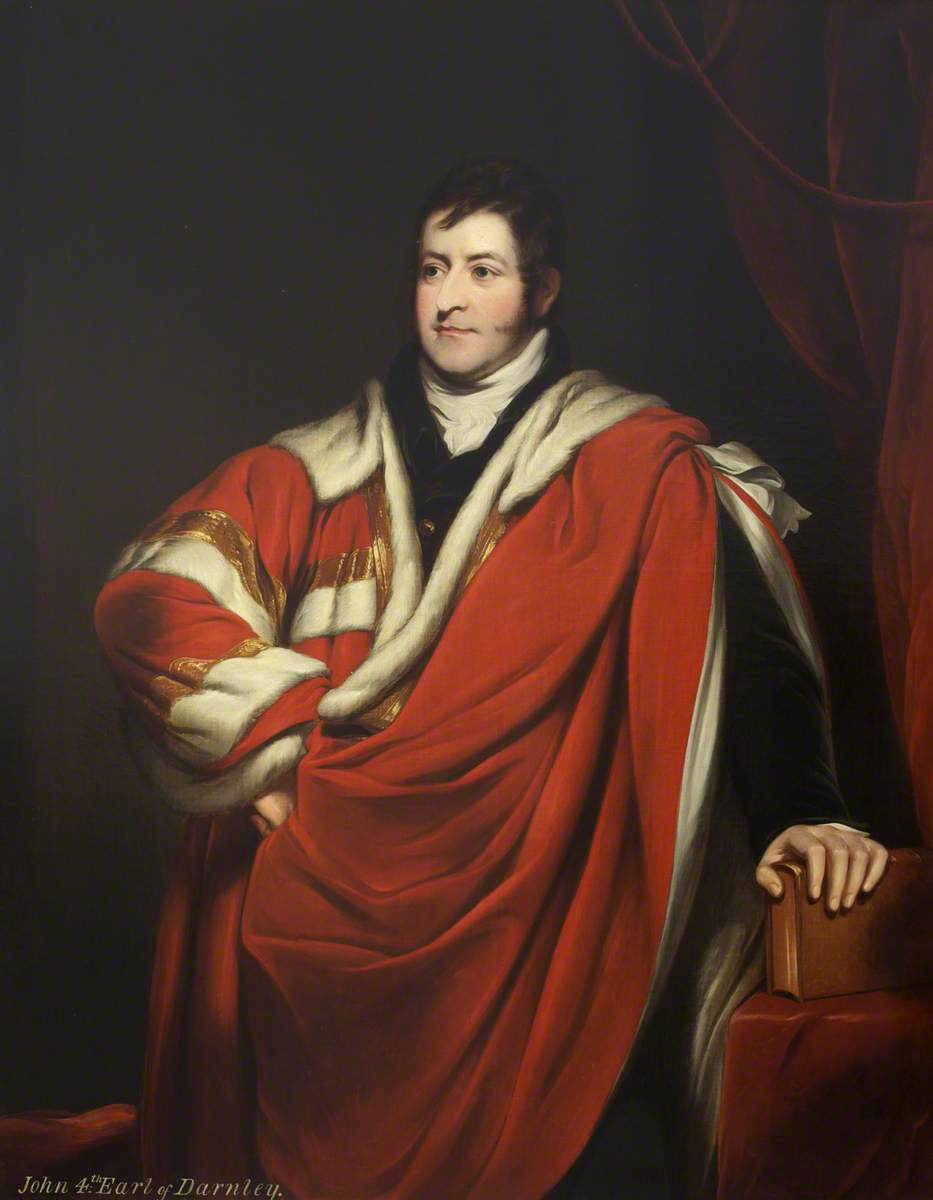
- Portrait of Lord Darnley, attributed to Thomas Phillips

Personal information
- Full name: John Bligh
- Born: 30 June 1767; Kingdom of Ireland
- Died: 17 March 1831 (aged 63); Cobham Hall, Kent, England
- Relatives: See: Bligh family

Domestic team information
- Years: Team
- 1789–1793: Marylebone Cricket Club (MCC)
- 1790–1796: Kent
- Children: 7, including Edward, John
- Parents: John Bligh, 3rd Earl of Darnley (father); Mary Stoyte (mother)

John Bligh, 4th Earl of Darnley (30 June 1767 – 17 March 1831), styled Lord Clifton until 1781, lord of the Manor of Cobham, Kent, was a British peer and cricketer.

== Early life ==
He was the son of John Bligh, 3rd Earl of Darnley, and succeeded his father as earl on the latter's death in 1781. He matriculated at Christ Church, Oxford on 16 November 1784. On 3 July 1793, he was made a DCL.

== Career ==
He resided at Cobham Hall, near Gravesend in Kent, and was commissioned as Lieutenant-Colonel Commandant of the Chatham and Dartford Regiment of Local Militia in 1809.

John Bligh was a noted amateur cricketer who made 27 known appearances in important matches between 1789 and 1796. He and his brother, the Honourable (later General) Edward Bligh, were staunch supporters of Kent cricket. The Bligh brothers, who originated from Athboy, County Meath, have been called "the first Irish cricketers".

== Personal life ==
On 26 August 1791, he married Elizabeth Brownlow (d. 22 December 1831), daughter of William Brownlow and his second wife Catherine Hall, by whom he had seven children:

- Lady Catherine Bligh (1792–1812)
- John Bligh, Lord Clifton (1793–1793)
- Edward Bligh, 5th Earl of Darnley (1795–1835)
- Lady Mary Bligh (1796–1823), who married her half-first cousin, Charles Brownlow, 1st Baron Lurgan in 1822.
- Hon. William Bligh (1797–1807)
- Hon. Sir John Duncan Bligh (1798–1872), a diplomat in Sweden and Hanover.
- Lady Elizabeth Bligh (d. 1872), who married her first cousin Rev. John Brownlow in 1833.

Lord Darnley died at Cobham Hall on 17 March 1831 and was succeeded in the earldom by his son Edward.

=== Legacy ===
Darnley Bay in the Northwest Territories, Canada was named for him by John Richardson.

== External sources ==
- Hansard 1803–2005: contributions in Parliament by the Earl of Darnley

Peerage of Ireland
Preceded by John Bligh	Earl of Darnley; 1781–1831	Succeeded by Edward Bligh
