= Thomas Bligh =

British Army officer

Lieutenant-General Thomas Bligh
- Born: 1685
- Died: 1775 (aged 89–90)
- Burial place: Athboy, Meath, Ireland
- Military career
- Allegiance: Great Britain
- Service years: 1740–1758
- Conflicts: War of the Austrian Succession; Battle of Melle; Seven Years' War; Raid on Cherbourg; Battle of Saint-Cast

Lieutenant-General Thomas Bligh (1685–1775) was a British Army officer best known for his service during the Seven Years' War when he led a series of amphibious raids, known as "descents" on the French coastline. Despite initial success in these operations, they came to an end following the disastrous Battle of Saint-Cast.

== Career ==
Bligh was born in 1685, the son of Irish politician Thomas Bligh and his wife Elizabeth née Napier. During his long service in the British army, he rose to the rank of Lieutenant general. In 1745, during the War of the Austrian Succession, as a Brigadier, he took over command of allied troops at the Battle of Melle and led part of the defeated force to safety. He fought at Dettingen, Val, Fontneay, and Melle. He was also commander of the British troops at Cherbourg. In 1758, he was appointed to command the descents, at the age of seventy-three. He led an initial successful Raid on Cherbourg in August 1758, capturing and destroying the town's fortifications. He then re-embarked and moved along the coast to St Malo. Confronted with adverse weather conditions, they were able only to land some of their force, which was soon confronted by a larger French force with had hurriedly marched there from Brest. In the scramble to get his men back onto the ships, Bligh fought a confused rearguard action, the Battle of Saint Cast suffering between 750 and 1,000 casualties before he was finally able to re-embark his men. They then sailed for England.

Bligh was poorly treated when he returned home. George II refused to receive him, considered an enormous slight, and he came under fierce criticism from all sides. One of the few to stand up for Bligh was the young George III, Prince of Wales, who chastised both Prime Minister Lord Newcastle and his ally William Pitt for not defending Bligh.

He was buried in Rathmore Church, Ireland.

== See also ==
- Great Britain in the Seven Years War

== Bibliography ==
- Anderson, Fred. Crucible of War: The Seven Years' War and the Fate of Empire in British North America, 1754–1766. Faber and Faber, 2001

Military offices
Preceded by Alexander Rose	Colonel of Bligh's Regiment of Foot; 1740–1746	Succeeded by Lord George Sackville
Preceded by Samuel Walter Whitshed	Colonel of Bligh's Regiment of Dragoons; 1746–1747	Succeeded by John Mordaunt
Preceded by Thomas Wentworth	Colonel of the 2nd Regiment of Horse; 1747–1758	Succeeded by Hon. John Waldegrave
