= John Bligh, 6th Earl of Darnley =

British peer

Lieutenant colonel The Right Honourable The Earl of Darnley DL

Personal details
- Born: John Stuart Bligh; 16 April 1827
- Died: 14 December 1896 (aged 69)
- Spouse: Lady Harriet Mary Pelham (after 1850)
- Children: Edward Bligh, 7th Earl of Darnley; Lady Edith Rashleigh; Lady Kathleen Brownlow; Ivo Bligh, 8th Earl of Darnley; LadyAlice Bligh; Arthur Bligh; Lady Mary Bligh; Lady Constance Childe-Pemberton
- Parent(s): Edward Bligh, 5th Earl of Darnley; Hon. Emma Jane Parnell
- Education: Christ Church, Oxford

Military service
- Branch/service: West Kent Yeomanry
- Rank: Lieutenant Colonel

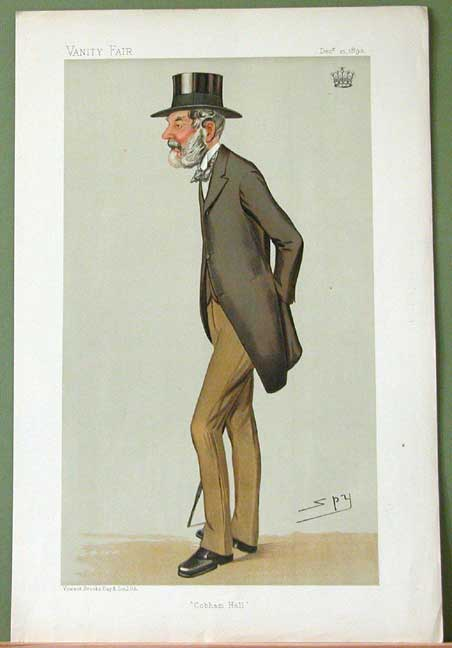
Caricature of the Earl of Darnley in Vanity Fair, 21 December 1893, by Leslie Ward

Lieutenant colonel John Stuart Bligh, 6th Earl of Darnley DL (16 April 1827 – 14 December 1896), styled Lord Clifton from 1831 to 1835, lord of the Manor of Cobham, Kent, was a British peer.

== Early life ==
He was the eldest son of Edward Bligh, 5th Earl of Darnley and the former Hon. Emma Jane Parnell (a daughter of Henry Parnell, 1st Baron Congleton). Among his siblings were the Rev. Edward Vesey Bligh, Lady Elizabeth Caroline Bligh (wife of Sir Reginald Cust), Lady Emma Bess Bligh (wife of Arthur Purey-Cust), the Rev. Henry Bligh (vicar of St James' Church, Hampton Hill).

Darnley matriculated at Christ Church, Oxford on 15 May 1845 and received his B.A. in 1848 and his M.A. in 1869.

=== Cricket career ===
An amateur cricketer, Bligh made a single appearance in first-class cricket for the Gentlemen of Kent against the Gentlemen of England at Canterbury in 1848. Batting twice in the match, he was dismissed without scoring in the Gentlemen of Kent first innings by Jones Nash, while in their second innings he was dismissed for 2 runs by Harvey Fellows.

== Career ==
Bligh succeeded his father in the earldom in 1835. He was appointed a Deputy Lieutenant of Kent on 3 September 1847.

On 24 July 1848, he was commissioned captain of the Cobham Troop of the West Kent Yeomanry. He was promoted to major on 18 April 1859, and to lieutenant-colonel on 28 April 1863. He retired from the Yeomanry on 9 September 1874, retaining his rank.

== Personal life ==
On 31 August 1850, Darnley married Lady Harriet Mary Pelham, the daughter of Henry Pelham, 3rd Earl of Chichester, and the former Lady Mary Brudenell (daughter of Robert Brudenell, 6th Earl of Cardigan). Together, they had eight children:

- Edward Bligh, 7th Earl of Darnley (1851–1900), who married Jemima Adeline Beatrice Blackwood, daughter of Francis J. L. Blackwood.
- Lady Edith Louisa Mary Bligh (1853–1904), who married George Burvill Rashleigh in 1882.
- Lady Kathleen Susan Emma Bligh (1854–1928), who married William Vesey Brownlow.
- Ivo Bligh, 8th Earl of Darnley (1859–1927), who married Florence Rose Morphy, daughter of John Stephen Morphy, of Beechworth, Victoria.
- Lady Alice Isabella Harriet Bligh (1860–1943), who died unmarried.
- Hon. Arthur Frederick Pelham Bligh (1865–1924), who died unmarried.
- Lady Mary Rose Florence Bligh (1868–1896), who died unmarried.
- Lady Constance Violet Lucy Bligh (b. 1869), who married William Shakespear Childe-Pemberton in 1894.

Lord Darnley died on 14 December 1896 and was succeeded by his eldest son, Edward.

Peerage of Ireland
Preceded by Edward Bligh	Earl of Darnley; 1835–1896	Succeeded by Edward Bligh
