= Lodovick Bligh =

English cricketer

Personal information
- Full name: Lodovick Edward Bligh
- Born: 24 November 1854; Dover, Kent
- Died: 16 May 1924 (aged 69); Minehead, Somerset

Domestic team information
- Years: Team
- 1878–1884: Kent County Cricket Club
- Source: Cricinfo, 8 March 2017

Lodovick Edward Bligh JP (24 November 1854 – 16 May 1924) was an English cricketer. He played ten first-class cricket matches for Kent County Cricket Club between 1878 and 1884.

== Early life ==
Bligh was born on 24 November 1854 into the Darnley family, who were closely associated with Kent cricket. He was a son of the English cricketer, diplomat and clergyman, Hon. Rev. Edward Vesey Bligh (1829–1908) and Lady Isabel Mary Frances Nevill (1831–1915), daughter of William Nevill, 4th Earl of Abergavenny. His paternal grandparents were Edward Bligh, 5th Earl of Darnley and Emma Jane, Countess of Darnley.

He attended Eton College and Cambridge University, although he did not make the cricket XI at either.

== Career ==
His father had played for Kent and his cousin, Ivo Bligh, 8th Earl of Darnley, also played for the county and captained the England cricket team in their Ashes win in Australia in 1882/3.

He gained the rank of Major in the 3rd Battalion, The Buffs. He also held the office of justice of the peace for Kent.

== Personal life ==
On 1 June 1886, Bligh married Marion Louisa Stewart-Savile (d. 1925), a daughter of Rev. Frederick Alexander Stewart-Savile and Sophia Stewart (née Dykes). Together, they had five children:

- Harroweton Lodovick Bligh (1887–1888)
- Algernon Stewart Bligh (1888–1952), who also played first-class cricket for Somerset from 1922 to 1926.
- Ronald Edward Bligh (1890–1891)
- Jack Frederick Bligh (1893–1917)
- Rose Marion Bligh (b. 1896)

Bligh died on 16 May 1924. His widow died the following year in 1925.

== Bibliography ==
- Carlaw, Derek (2020). Kent County Cricketers, A to Z: Part One (1806–1914) (PDF). Cardiff: ACS.
