= Henry Bligh =

English cricketer and clergyman

Personal information
- Born: 10 June 1834; Westminster, London
- Died: 4 March 1905 (aged 70); Winchester, Hampshire
- Source: Cricinfo, 8 March 2017

Reverend Henry Bligh (10 June 1834 – 4 March 1905) was an English clergyman and cricketer. He played eight first-class cricket matches between 1853 and 1860, five for Kent County Cricket Club, two for the Gentlemen of Kent and one for Marylebone Cricket Club (MCC).

Bligh was born in Westminster, the fifth child of Edward Bligh, 5th Earl of Darnley and his wife Emma Parnell. The Darnley family lived at Cobham Hall near Gravesend in Kent and was closely associated with Kent cricket and Bligh's two brothers, John Bligh, 6th Earl of Darnley and Edward Vesey Bligh both played the sport. John was President of Kent and MCC and his son, Ivo Bligh, 8th Earl of Darnley, played for Kent and captained England in their Ashes win in Australia in 1882/3.

Bligh was vicar of Abingdon and then of St James' Church, Hampton Hill between 1881 and 1893, where he was also the President of the cricket club. He left St James' in 1893 as a result of "suffering from the strain of over-work" and moved to Holy Trinity Church in Fareham where he was vicar between 1893 and 1900. After retiring in 1900 he lived in Winchester but was buried at St James' in Hampton Hill when he died in 1905.

== Bibliography ==
- Carlaw, Derek (2020). Kent County Cricketers, A to Z: Part One (1806–1914) (PDF). Cardiff: ACS.
