= Edward Bligh =

Edward Bligh may refer to:

- Edward Bligh (British Army officer) (1769–1840), lieutenant-general in the British Army, Irish politician, amateur cricketer and member of the Marylebone Cricket Club
- Edward Bligh, 2nd Earl of Darnley (1715–1747), Irish peer
- Edward Bligh, 5th Earl of Darnley (1795–1835), British peer and politician
- Edward Bligh, 7th Earl of Darnley (1851–1900), English landowner and cricketer
- Edward Bligh (cricketer, died 1872) (c. 1800–1872), Irish landowner and cricketer
- Edward Vesey Bligh (1829–1908), English cricketer, diplomat and clergyman

== See also ==
- Ned Bligh (1864–1892), American baseball player
