= International cricket in 1882–83 =

International cricket season

The 1882–83 international cricket season was from September 1882 to March 1883. The tour was generally known as IFW Bligh's XI tour of Australia and considered as the birth of The Ashes.

== Season overview ==
International tours
Start date	Home team	Away team	Results [Matches]	
Start date	Home team	Away team	Test	FC
30 December 1882	Australia	England	2–2 [4]	—

== January ==
=== England in Australia ===
The Ashes Test match series
No.	Date	Home captain	Away captain	Venue	Result
Test 10	30 December–2 January	Billy Murdoch	Ivo Bligh	Melbourne Cricket Ground, Melbourne	Australia by 9 wickets
Test 11	19–22 January	Billy Murdoch	Ivo Bligh	Melbourne Cricket Ground, Melbourne	England by an innings and 27 runs
Test 12	26–30 January	Billy Murdoch	Ivo Bligh	Sydney Cricket Ground, Sydney	England by 69 runs
Test 13	17–21 February	Billy Murdoch	Ivo Bligh	Sydney Cricket Ground, Sydney	Australia by 4 wickets
