= Alexander Cowie =

English cricketer, soldier, and poet

Personal information
- Full name: Alexander Gordon Cowie
- Born: 27 February 1889; Hordle, Hampshire, England
- Died: 7 April 1916 (aged 27); Amarah, Mesopotamia
- Batting: Right-handed
- Bowling: Right-arm fast

Domestic team information
- Years: Team
- 1910–1911: Cambridge University
- 1910: Hampshire

Career statistics
Competition	First-class
Matches	14
Runs scored	98
Batting average	7.00
100s/50s	–/–
Top score	28
Balls bowled	1,979
Wickets	58
Bowling average	24.05
5 wickets in innings	5
10 wickets in match	–
Best bowling	6/87
Catches/stumpings	6/–
- Source: Cricinfo, 1 January 2010

Alexander Gordon Cowie (27 February 1889 – 7 April 1916) was an English first-class cricketer, British Army officer, and a noted war poet during the First World War.

== Life, cricket and war service ==
The son of the soldier Alexander Hugh Cowie, he was born in February 1889 at Yeatton House in Hordle, Hampshire. Cowie was educated at Charterhouse School, before matriculating to Caius College, Cambridge. He made his debut in first-class cricket for Cambridge University against Surrey at Fenner's. He featured six times for Cambridge in 1910, including in The University Match against Oxford at Lord's. In that same season, he also played for a combined Oxford and Cambridge Universities team against a combined Army and Navy team at Aldershot, in addition to making two appearances for Hampshire in the County Championship; in his second match for Hampshire against Lancashire, he took 5 for 94 in Lancashire's first innings. The following season, he made a further three appearances for Cambridge, but did not appear in The University Match. In nine first-class matches for Cambridge, he took 43 wickets at an average of 23.25; he took four five wicket hauls, with best figures of 6 for 87. Randolph Hodgson operating under the pen-name 'A County Vicar' described him as an "intimidating" bowler, with Wisden noting he was "somewhat erratic".

Having been commissioned into the Royal Engineers Militia in December 1907, Cowie was promoted to lieutenant with the Royal Monmouthshire Royal Engineers in January 1911, after which he was commissioned into the regular army with the Seaforth Highlanders in December 1911. Cowie later made two further appearances in first-class cricket for the British Army cricket team, against the Royal Navy in 1913 and Cambridge University in 1914. He served in the First World War with the Seaforth Highlanders, gaining the temporary rank of captain in June 1915 and the full rank in October of the same year. Cowie was wounded in action in 1915, but returned to service in the Mesopotamian campaign, but later died in April 1916 from wounds sustained near Amarah. He was subsequently buried at the Amara War Cemetery. A short poem of his, titled "Lines by Captain Alexander Gordon Cowie, Seaforth Highlanders", appeared after his death in The Lotus Magazine, and has since been anthologized in books of war poetry. As a 22-year-old, he was described as "a writer of poems of great beauty".
