= Algernon Bligh =

English cricketer (1888–1952)

Personal information
- Full name: Algernon Stuart Bligh
- Born: 6 October 1888; Marylebone, London, England
- Died: 27 December 1952 (aged 64); Minehead, Somerset, England
- Batting: Right-handed
- Role: Wicket-keeper

Domestic team information
- Years: Team
- 1922–1926: Somerset
- FC debut: 7 June 1922 Somerset v Derbyshire
- Last FC: 24 July 1926 Somerset v Glamorgan

Career statistics
Competition	First-class
Matches	14
Runs scored	455
Batting average	17.50
100s/50s	0/2
Top score	73*
Balls bowled	36
Wickets	0
Bowling average	–
5 wickets in innings	–
10 wickets in match	–
Best bowling	–
Catches/stumpings	13/–
- Source: ESPNcricinfo, 23 November 2013

Algernon Stuart Bligh (6 October 1888 – 27 December 1952) played first-class cricket for Somerset from 1922 to 1926, appearing in 12 games in 1925. He was born in Marylebone, London and died at Minehead, Somerset. He was descended from the Earls of Darnley and was a cousin of Ivo Bligh, the England cricket captain who retrieved The Ashes from Australia in 1882–83. In one source, his second forename is written as "Stewart".

== Background ==
Bligh was the great-grandson of Edward Bligh, 5th Earl of Darnley and was educated at Eton College and the Royal Agricultural College, Cirencester. He was married twice and had two children from each marriage.

== Cricket ==
Bligh was a right-handed batsman, most successfully in the middle-order but in several of his games for Somerset he opened the innings. He passed 50 twice in his first-class career. In the match against Glamorgan at Cardiff Arms Park in 1925, he made an unbeaten 73 in the second innings, and this was the highest score of his career. Wisden reported that he "batted admirably for two hours and three quarters". In the following match, he made 71 against Essex at Taunton.

He had played a single match in 1922 and after his 12 games in 1925, he returned for another single match in 1926.
