= 2027 Ashes series =

Test cricket series between Australia and England

- Part of Australian cricket team in England in 2027
- Date: 18 June – 2 August 2027
- Location: England
Teams
- England: Australia
Captains
- TBC: TBC
Most runs
- TBC: TBC
Most wickets
- TBC: TBC

The 2027 Ashes series, branded as the Rothesay Men's Ashes series for sponsorship reasons, is an upcoming series of Test cricket matches to be played between England and Australia for The Ashes. The five-match series is due to take place between June and August 2027.

This will be the 38th Ashes series to take place in England and the 75th series overall. Australia are the holders of the Ashes going into the series, having won the previous instalment 4–1.

== Venues ==
Locations of the Tests

The five venues will be Trent Bridge, Lord's, Edgbaston, the Rose Bowl and The Oval. The venues and dates for the series were confirmed by the ECB on 23 July 2026.

The Rose Bowl in Southampton will host its first Ashes match, becoming the tenth different UK ground to do so. The Test at Trent Bridge will be the first Ashes fixture at that venue since 2015.

The decision not to include any ground in northern England (either Headingley or Old Trafford) in the 2027 schedule was met with criticism. Because of this, there were questions whether to replace either Lord’s or The Oval, each situated in London, with one in the north; no change was made but the ECB decided the next series in 2031 would include both Headingly and Old Trafford.

== Fixtures ==
=== First Test ===
18–22 June 2027

England	v	Australia

Trent Bridge, Nottingham

=== Second Test ===
30 June–4 July 2027

England	v	Australia

Lord's, London

=== Third Test ===
8–12 July 2027

England	v	Australia

Edgbaston, Birmingham

=== Fourth Test ===
21–25 July 2027

England	v	Australia

Rose Bowl, Southampton

=== Fifth Test ===
29 July–2 August 2027

England	v	Australia

The Oval, London
