= Lionel Cust =

British art historian and author (1859–1929)

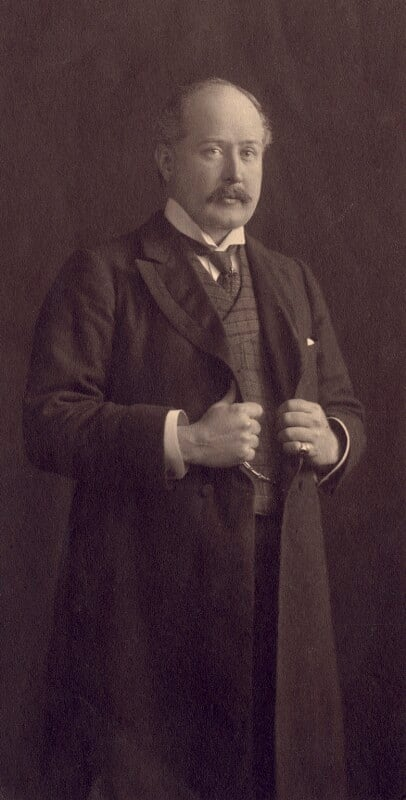
Cust in 1905

Sir Lionel Henry Cust KCVO FSA (25 January 1859 – 12 October 1929) was a British art historian, courtier and museum director. He was director of the National Portrait Gallery from 1895 to 1909 and co-edited The Burlington Magazine from 1909 to 1919. He was the father of Lionel George Archer Cust.

== Early life and family ==
Cust was born in London in January 1859, the son of Sir Reginald Cust (1828–1912), a lawyer, and his wife Lady Elizabeth Bligh, daughter of the 5th Earl of Darnley. He was educated at Eton College and Trinity College, Cambridge.

In 1895, Cust married Sybil Lyttelton, daughter of George Lyttelton, 4th Baron Lyttelton and Sybella Clive. Her father's family were prominent politicians.

== Career ==
In 1884 he joined the British Museum's Department of Prints and Drawings, at the suggestion of the Keeper Sidney Colvin. Unusually for a British scholar of his time, Cust had a predilection for the artistic schools of Northern Europe, not those of Italy. He compiled two catalogues of works on paper in the British Museum collection, in 1893 and 1896. Cust contributed a number of entries to Bryan's Dictionary of Painters and Engravers and the Dictionary of National Biography.

In 1895 he was appointed Director of the National Portrait Gallery, succeeding the founding director, Sir George Scharf. In the Portrait Gallery Cust's two strongest interests, in art and British nobility, converged. Cust was of aristocratic stock himself and his obituary in The Times described him as a "walking genealogy". During Cust's directorship the Gallery moved to its current premises on St Martin's Place in London.

Upon the accession of King Edward VII in 1901, Cust was appointed a Gentleman Usher and Surveyor of Pictures in Ordinary to His Majesty, and kept both positions until 1927. He was appointed a Member of the Royal Victorian Order (MVO) in August 1901, promoted to a Commander (CVO) of the order in 1914, and knighted as a Knight Commander of the Royal Victorian Order (KCVO) in 1927.

== Selected publications ==
- Albrecht Dürer : a study of his life and work. 1897.
- with Sidney Colvin: History of the Society of Dilettanti. 1898.
- A history of Eton College. 1899.
- Anthony Van Dyck, an historical study of his life and works. 1900.
- Eton college portraits. 1910.
- 'Queen Elizabeth's Kirtle', The Burlington Magazine, 33:189 (December 1918), pp. 196–201, on the Bacton Altar Cloth
- Jerusalem : a historical sketch; illustrated by Benton Fletcher. 1924.
- The Cenci: a study in murder. 1929.
- King Edward VII and his court; some reminiscences. 1930.

Court offices
Preceded by Sir John Charles Robinson	Surveyor of the Queen's Pictures; 1901–1927	Succeeded by Sir C. H. Collins Baker
Preceded by Sir John Charles Robinson	Surveyor of the Queen's Pictures; 1901–1927	Succeeded by Sir Cecil Harcourt-Smith as Surveyor of the Queen's Works of Art
