= Randolph Hodgson =

English Anglican vicar and writer

"A Country Vicar" in 1937

The Rev. Randolph Llewelyn Hodgson (24 January 1870 – 6 December 1952) was an English Anglican vicar and writer, who contributed for more than 20 years to The Cricketer magazine under the pen-name of A Country Vicar.

== Early life ==
Hodgson was born in Playford, Suffolk, where his father Christopher was a clergyman, but the family moved to Yorkshire, where he spent most of his childhood. He went to Queens' College, Cambridge, in 1890, and graduated BA in 1895. A good rugby player, he was prevented from obtaining his Blue by a leg injury he suffered while playing rugby soon after he arrived at Cambridge. The injury virtually crippled him throughout his undergraduate years and continued to affect him for the remainder of his life.

After graduating, Hodgson spent the next five years in Austria-Hungary as English tutor to Franz Joseph, son of the Prince of Thurn and Taxis. In order to dispel some of the ignorance the English had about the region, he wrote two books on his travels there, which were copiously illustrated by Princess Marie of Thurn and Taxis (1855–1934).

In 1902 Hodgson co-wrote, with Florence Darnley, the wife of the English Test cricket captain Ivo Bligh, a romantic novel titled Elma Trevor. In the novel, which is set partly in Austria, the eponymous heroine, "loved by one man ... marrie[s] another, and in the end discovers that she is made for a third".

== Clergyman and cricket writer ==
Hodgson was ordained in 1906 and served first as curate to his father, who at the time was the rector at Campsea Ashe in Suffolk. He played a few times as a lower-order batsman for Suffolk County Cricket Club in the Minor Counties Championship between 1904 and 1907, and served as club secretary around the same time. He continued to play club cricket for many years.

Hodgson later served several parishes for short periods as curate: Ashill in Norfolk, New Milton in Hampshire, St Paul's in South Hampstead, and St Katherine Coleman in the City of London. He became Vicar of South Baddesley, Hampshire, in 1917 and remained there until he retired in 1946. In October 1910, while serving at New Milton, he married Nora Marsh in Brighton, Sussex.

Hodgson began writing as "A Country Vicar" in The Cricketer in the January 1924 issue and continued until 1948. He wrote his reminiscences of the cricket he had played and watched at village, club and county level, and the cricket he had watched at first-class and Test level, often in the company of Nora, who was knowledgeable about cricket and enthusiastic. He collected these reminiscences into three books.

Hodgson died at St Columba's Hospital in Hampstead in December 1952. Nora survived him.

== Books ==
- Wanderings through Unknown Austria 1896
- On Plain and Peak: Sporting and Other Sketches of Bohemia and Tyrol 1898
- Elma Trevor 1902 (with Florence Darnley)
- Cricket Memories 1930 (as "A Country Vicar")
- Second Innings 1933 (as "A Country Vicar")
- The Happy Cricketer 1946 (as "A Country Vicar")
