= Edward Vesey Bligh =

English cricketer, diplomat, and clergyman

The Reverend Honourable Edward Vesey Bligh JP DL (28 February 1829 – 22 April 1908) was an English cricketer, diplomat and clergyman. A descendant of the Darnley Earldom in Kent, he, along with many other members of his family, acted as a patron of cricket in the county during the nineteenth century.

== Early life ==
Bligh was born on 28 February 1829 at Grosvenor Place, Belgravia. He was the second son of Edward Bligh, 5th Earl of Darnley and Emma Jane, Countess of Darnley. His father died in 1835 and Bligh later recalled the extensive use of corporal punishment inflicted on him by his mother, which, he argued, could be distinguished by the beatings he received whilst a pupil at Eton, 'by the love which lay behind the floggings'.

== Cricket ==
He was not in the Cricket XI at school but as early as 1848 was appearing in important matches for the Gentlemen of Kent. On going up to Christ Church, where he matriculated on 27 May 1847, he managed to secure a place in the Oxford University team, and was awarded his Blue in 1850. A hard-hitting right-handed batsman and slow lob bowler, he played for Kent until 1864. He also appeared for Marylebone Cricket Club (MCC) and also once for Middlesex in 1862. In all he played 40 first-class matches scoring 786 runs at 12.47.

Bligh's highest innings was 53 for Kent versus England at the St Lawrence Ground, Canterbury in 1862. His bowling record is incomplete but he is credited with 23 wickets at an average of 19.97. He took 6 wickets for the Gentlemen of Kent against the Gentlemen of England at Lord's in 1851.

He also appeared for other teams in minor matches. In 1850 he played for an XVIII of Oxfordshire which defeated the All England Eleven. Whilst at Oxford he also played for the Bullingdon Club and in 1850 against I Zingari top scored with 40 and took 10 opposition wickets. He also appeared for I Zingari on a number of occasions.

== Later life ==
After leaving Oxford, Bligh joined the Diplomatic Service and was successively attaché at Hanover, Florence and Berlin. He was appointed a lieutenant in the Queen's Own West Kent Yeomanry on 9 August 1853. In 1854 he went up to Cambridge as a Fellow Commoner at Downing and graduated MA in 1855. He was ordained Deacon in 1855 and was Curate of Snodland, 1855–6. He resigned his Yeomanry commission in 1856, and later served as chaplain to the regiment. He was Vicar of Rotherfield from 1856 to 1865 and of Birling from 1865 to 1875. He was also a JP for Kent, and was appointed a deputy lieutenant of the county in the summer of 1900.

== Family life ==
In 1854 Edward Bligh married Lady Isabel Mary Frances Nevill, daughter of William Nevill, 4th Earl of Abergavenny. They had two children, Rosalind and Lodovick. Lodovick Bligh also represented Kent at Cricket, and his son Algernon Bligh played for Somerset. Edward Bligh's nephew, Ivo Bligh regained the Ashes as captain of the England team in Australia in 1882–3.

Edward Vesey Bligh died on 22 April 1908 at Fartherwell Hall, West Malling, Kent.
