= Edward Bligh, 7th Earl of Darnley =

English landowner and aristocrat

Edward Henry Stuart Bligh, 7th Earl of Darnley (21 August 1851 – 31 October 1900), styled Lord Clifton until 1896, lord of the Manor of Cobham, Kent, was an English landowner and aristocrat who played first-class cricket for Kent and for other amateur sides in the 1870s. He was born and died at the English home of the Earls of Darnley, Cobham Hall, at Cobham, near Gravesend in Kent.

"(Lord) Clifton"—as he often signed—was a well-known ornithologist.

== Biography ==
Described as "having a fearsome temper and being profligate", Bligh matriculated at Christ Church, Oxford on 8 June 1870. In 1896, Bligh succeeded his father as the Earl of Darnley and "spent money like water", greatly reducing the wealth of the Darnleys.

On 26 January 1899, he married Jemima Adeline Beatrice Blackwood (1880–1964), daughter of Francis James Lindsay Blackwood (1849–1919), by whom he had one daughter: Elizabeth Bligh, 17th Baroness Clifton (1900–1937).

Upon his death on 31 October 1900, he was succeeded as Earl of Darnley by his brother Ivo and as Baron Clifton by his infant daughter, Elizabeth.

== Ornithology ==
Edward Henry Stuart, Lord Clifton was elected MBOU, Member of the British Ornithologists' Union, in 1876. As "(Lord) Clifton" for many years he wrote small contributions to The Zoologist, beginning in 1866. His first contribution was about the observation of an ortolan bunting on 10 April 1866, at Cobham.

== Sources ==
- Wynne-Thomas, P. & Griffiths, P. (2002) ‘'Ivo Bligh", Famous Cricketers Series – No. 67, ACS Publications: Nottingham. ISBN 1 902171 60 8.
- Hansard 1803–2005: contributions in Parliament by Edward Henry Stuart Bligh, 7th Earl of Darnley

Peerage of Ireland
Preceded by John Bligh	Earl of Darnley; 1896–1900	Succeeded by Ivo Bligh
Peerage of England
Preceded by John Bligh	Baron Clifton; 1896–1900	Succeeded by Elizabeth Bligh
