= Arthur Purey-Cust =

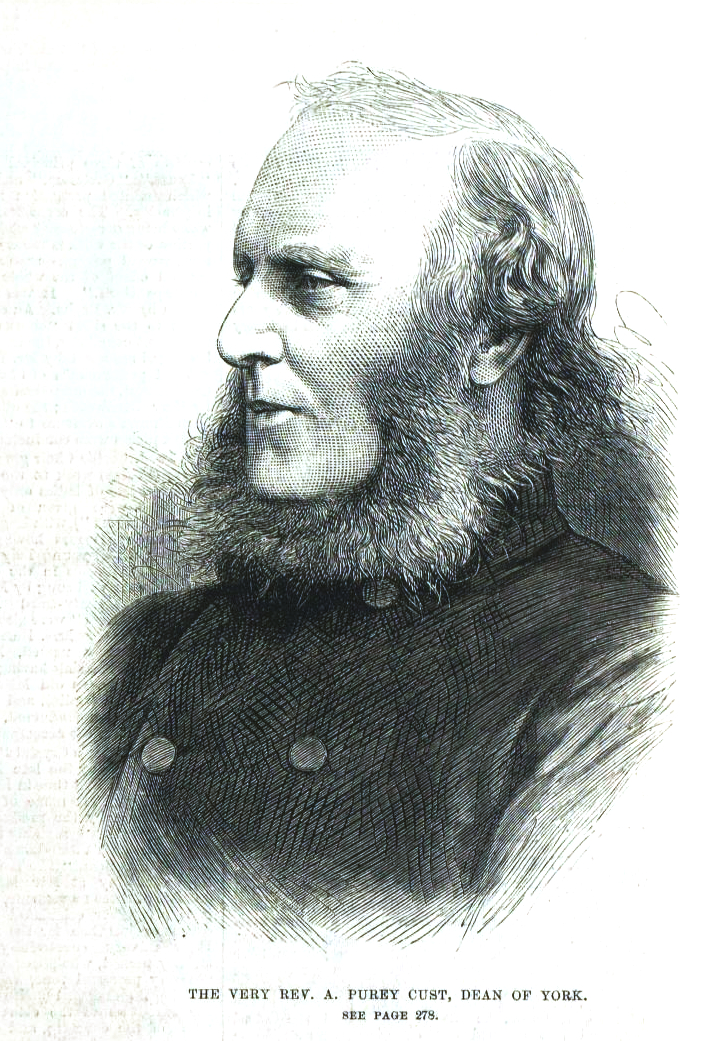

Arthur Perceval Purey-Cust (born Arthur Perceval Cust; 21 February 1828 – 23 December 1916) was a Church of England cleric and author who served as Dean of York from 1880 to 1916.

== Biography ==
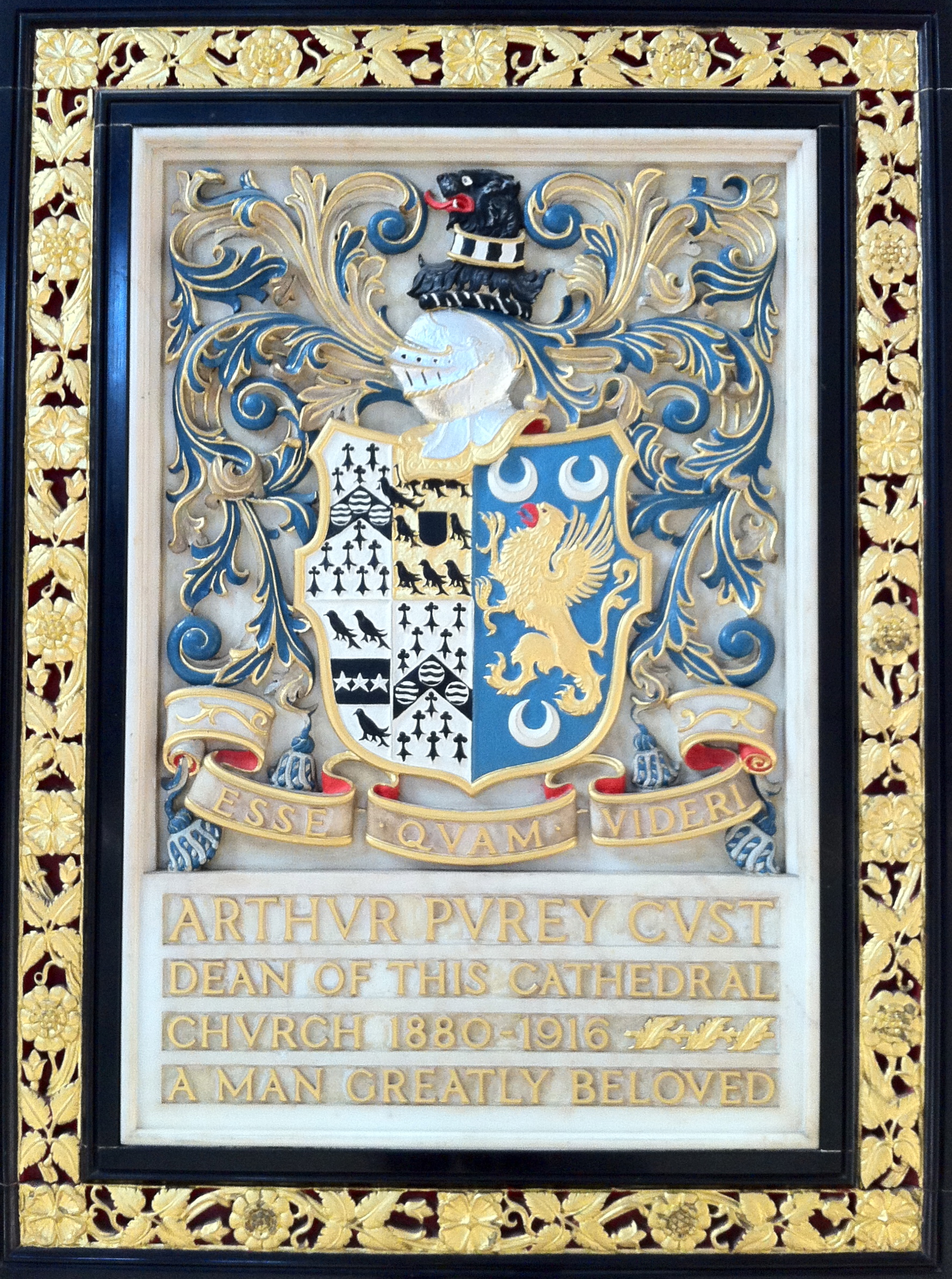
Mural monument to Arthur Purey-Cust in the south transept of York Minster

Purey-Cust was born as Arthur Perceval Cust, the younger son of the Honourable William Cust who was the younger son of Brownlow Cust, 1st Baron Brownlow. His mother was Sophia, daughter of Thomas Newnham. He was educated at Brasenose College, and later became a fellow of All Souls' College, Oxford. He was ordained deacon 1851 and priest 1852.

Purey-Cust's early posts were: a curacy at Northchurch, Hertfordshire; incumbencies at Cheddington and Reading; Honorary Canon of Oxford; and Rural Dean of Oxford. He married Lady Emma Bess Bligh, a daughter of Edward Bligh, 5th Earl of Darnley.

Purey-Cust became the Archdeacon of Buckingham in June 1875, and installed Vicar of Aylesbury in the same year. His final appointment was as Dean of York from 1880 to 1916.

For the next 36 years, Purey-Cust meticulously catalogued York Minster's heritage and was the author of Heraldry of York Minster, 1890. He died in office in his 88th year and is commemorated by a mural monument in York Minster and by the adjacent Purey-Cust Lodge.

== List of works ==
Works written by Purey-Cust include:

- Parochial Organization (1877);
- The Heraldry of York Minster (1890);
- Picturesque Old York (1896);
- Our English Minsters (1897);
- The Crowning of Monarchs (1907)
