= Reginald Cust =

Sir Reginald John Cust (1828 – 11 June 1913) was a barrister of Lincoln's Inn, judge, and Chief Commissioner of the West India Incumbered Estates Commission. He was knighted in the 1890 Birthday Honours.

== Origins ==
He was a son of Rev. Hon. Henry Cockayne Cust (1780–1861), of Cockayne Hatley in Bedfordshire, a Canon of Windsor, a younger son of Brownlow Cust, 1st Baron Brownlow of Belton House in Lincolnshire. His mother was Lady Anna Maria Elizabeth Needham, a daughter of General Francis Needham, 1st Earl of Kilmorey. He was educated at Eton and Trinity College, Cambridge, where he studied the mathematical tripos and graduated 15th Wrangler in 1852. That same year, he was elected President of the Cambridge Union.

== Marriage and children ==
He married Lady Elizabeth Caroline Bligh (1830–1914), a historian and genealogist, a daughter of Edward Bligh, 5th Earl of Darnley of Cobham Hall in Kent. The Bligh family was the heir of the Stewarts of Cobham Hall, Dukes of Richmond and Lennox, Earls of Darnley, Seigneurs d'Aubigny in France and cousins of the Stuart monarchs, the last in the male line of whom was Charles Stewart, 3rd Duke of Richmond, 6th Duke of Lennox (1639–1672). She was the author of (as "Lady Elizabeth Cust") Some Account of the Stuarts of Aubigny, in France, London, 1891 and of Records of the Cust family of Pinchbeck, Stamford and Belton in Lincolnshire, 1479-1700, 3 vols, 1898. By his wife he had issue including:

- Sir Lionel Henry Cust (1859–1929), a royal courtier, antiquary and art expert who served as Surveyor of the King's Pictures.

Reginald Cust died in London on 11 June 1913.

== Selected publications ==
- A Treatise on the West Indian Incumbered Estates Acts, 17 and 18 Vict., c. 117-21 and 22 Vict., c. 96. With an appendix, containing the acts &c. London, 1859.
- A Treatise on the West Indian Incumbered Estates Acts: 17 and 18 Vict., c. 117-21 and 22 Vict., c. 96; 25 and 26 Vict., c. 45-27 and 28 Vict., c. 108. With an appendix, containing the acts, general rules, forms, and directions, additional forms, local acts, tables of fees, solicitor's fees and charges. And reports of cases (heard before Henry James Stonor, esq., chief commissioner.) 2nd edition. William Amer, London, 1865.
- Supplement to A Treatise on the West Indian Incumbered Estates Acts: With reports of cases decided subsequently to the year 1864. London: William Amer, London, 1874.
- Marriage with a Deceased Wife's Sister Considered Historically. Kegan Paul, Trench & Co., London, 1888.
- Early Poems. Kegan Paul, Trench, Trübner & Co., London, 1892.

== See also ==
- Deceased Wife's Sister's Marriage Act 1907
