= St James's Church, Hampton Hill =

Church in Hampton Hill, London

St James's Church
- St James's Church
- St James's Church
- 51°25′51.4″N 0°21′15.56″W
- OS grid reference: TQ 14015 71414
- Location: Hampton Hill
- Country: England
- Denomination: Church of England
- Churchmanship: Central
- Website: stjames-hamptonhill.org.uk

History
- Dedication: St James

Architecture
- Heritage designation: Grade II listed
- Architect: William Wigginton
- Completed: 1863

Administration
- Diocese: Diocese of London
- Archdeaconry: Middlesex
- Deanery: Hampton
- Parish: Hampton Hill

Clergy
- Vicar: Revd. Derek Winterburn
- Priest: Canon Tim Marwood
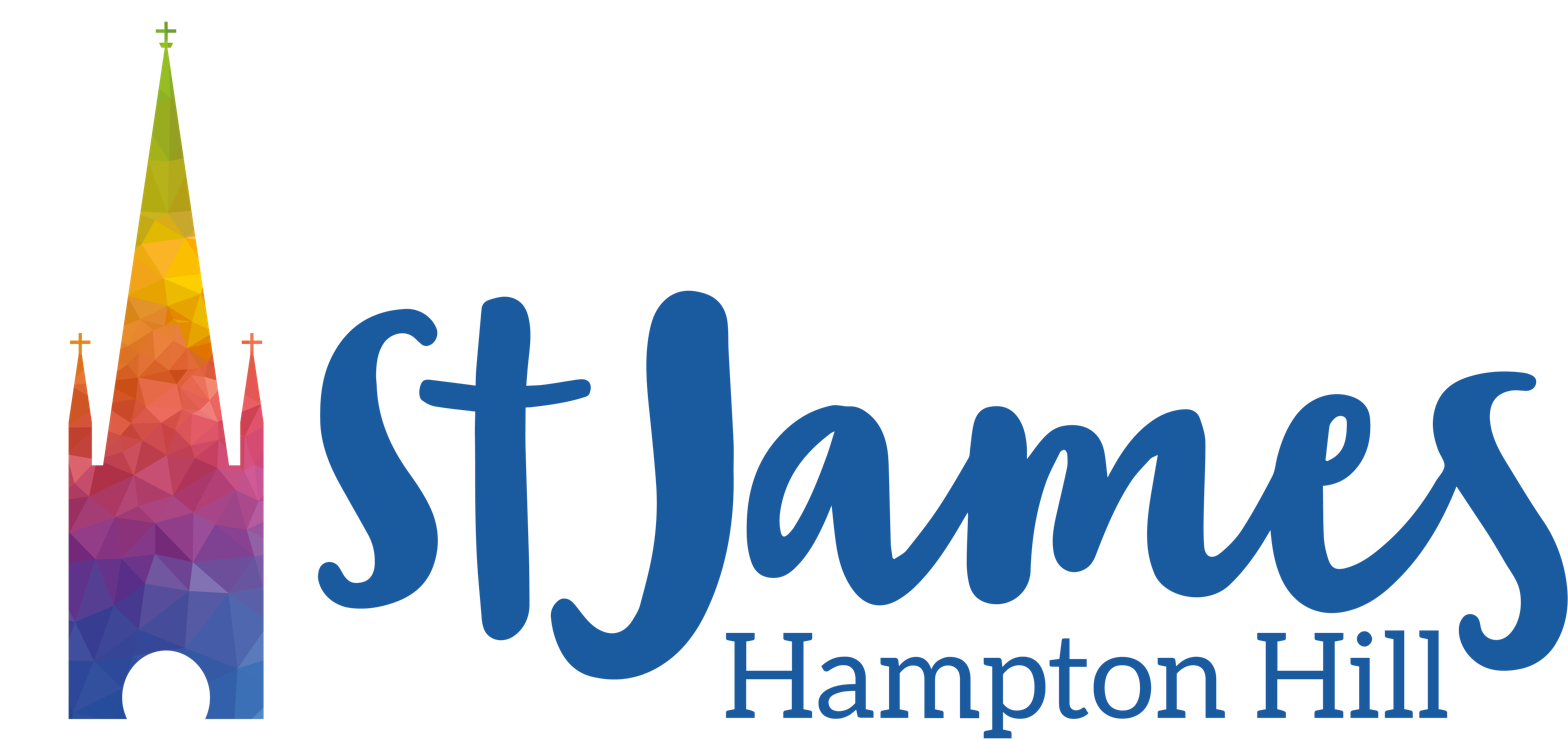

Listed Building – Grade II
- Official name: Church of St James
- Designated: 7 March 1996
- Reference no.: 1255505

St James's Church is a Grade II listed parish church in the Church of England in Hampton Hill, London.

== History ==
The first church building was opened in 1863 to designs by the architect William Wigginton. It was later enlarged, with work starting in 1873. The tower was started in 1887 and completed early in 1889. The clock was provided by Smith of Derby in 1893.

A very full historical account is available at the church website www.stjames-hamptonhill.org.uk

== Vicars ==
- Fitzroy John Fitzwygram 1863–1881
- Hon. Henry Bligh 1881–1893
- Charles Robert Job 1894–1914
- Richard Coad-Pryor 1914–1923
- Frederick Pearce Hope Harvey 1923–1950
- Rupert Hoyle Brunt 1951–1980 (formerly vicar of St Faith's Church, Nottingham)
- John Nicholas Chubb 1981–1988
- Dr Brian Leathard 1989–2006
- Peter Vannozzi 2006–2015
- Revd Derek Winterburn 2016–

== Organ ==
The church had a three manual pipe organ by Bishop which was obtained from St Peter's Church, Eaton Square, in 1874. This has subsequently been rebuilt and expanded by Hele and Co in 1912 and 1951, and again in 1997 by John Males when new stops were added from St Mary's Church, Twickenham. A specification of the organ can be found on the National Pipe Organ Register.
