= Edward Bligh, 5th Earl of Darnley =

British peer and politician

The Right Honourable The Earl of Darnley
- Born: 25 February 1795
- Died: 12 February 1835 (aged 39)
- Spouse: Emma Jane Parnell
- Issue: 6, including John, Edward, Henry
- Father: John Bligh, 4th Earl of Darnley
- Mother: Elizabeth Brownlow

Arms of Bligh: Azure, a griffin segreant or armed and langued gules between three crescents argent

Edward Bligh, 5th Earl of Darnley, FRS (25 February 1795 – 12 February 1835), styled Lord Clifton until 1831, lord of the Manor of Cobham, Kent, was a British peer and politician.

== Background ==
Darnley was the second but eldest surviving son of John Bligh, 4th Earl of Darnley, and Elizabeth Brownlow, 3rd daughter of the Rt Hon. William Brownlow. He was educated at Eton College and Christ Church, Oxford, matriculating on 22 October 1812, where he took degrees of Bachelor of Arts (BA) in 1816, proceeding Master of Arts (MA) in 1819.

== Political career ==
Darnley was returned to the House of Commons representing Canterbury in 1818, a seat he held until 1830 for the Whig Party. In 1831 he succeeded his father in the earldom and took his seat in the House of Lords. He also served as Lord Lieutenant of County Meath between 1831 and 1835, and was elected a Fellow of the Royal Society in 1833.

== Marriage and children ==
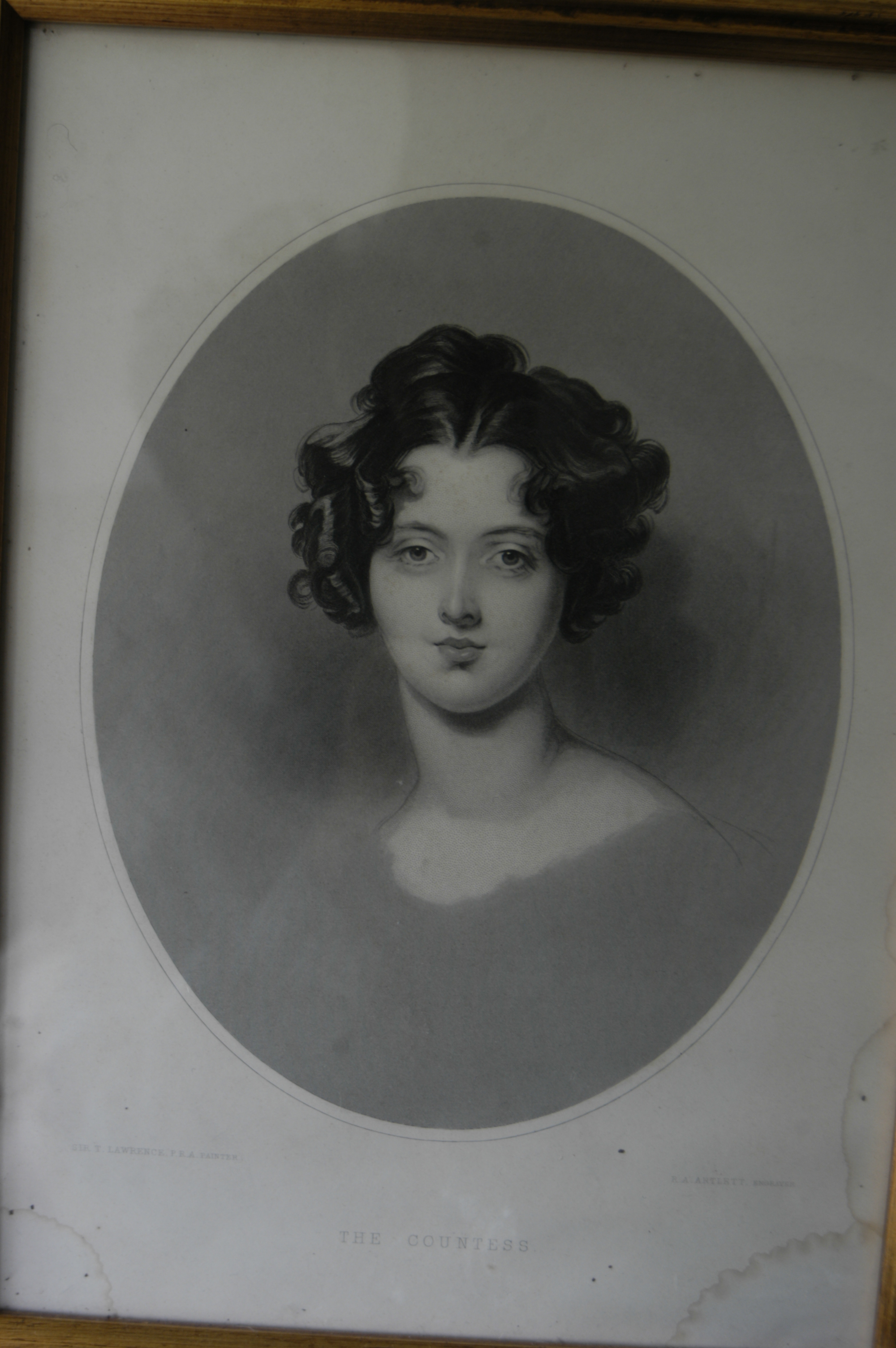
Engraving after Sir Thomas Lawrence of The Hon. Emma Jane Parnell (later Countess of Darnley).

In 1825 he married the Hon. Emma Jane Parnell, a daughter of Henry Parnell, 1st Baron Congleton, by whom he had three sons and two daughters:

- John Bligh, 6th Earl of Darnley (1827–1896)
- Rev. Hon. Edward Vesey Bligh (1829–1908)
- Lady Elizabeth Caroline Bligh (1830–1914), who married Sir Reginald Cust (1828–1912) on 13 December 1855 and had issue, including the courtier Sir Lionel Cust. She was a historian and genealogist, who (as "Lady Elizabeth Cust") was the author of Some Account of the Stuarts of Aubigny, in France, London, 1891 (her ancestors at Cobham Hall), and of Records of the Cust family of Pinchbeck, Stamford and Belton in Lincolnshire, 1479-1700, 3 vols, 1898.
- Lady Emma Bess Bligh (1832–1917), married Arthur Purey-Cust on 6 June 1854 and had issue
- Rev. Henry Bligh (10 June 1834 – 4 March 1905), vicar of St James' Church, Hampton Hill 1881–1893 and Holy Trinity Church, Fareham 1893–1900, married first Emma Armytage (d. 27 December 1881) and second Anne Elizabeth Dobree Butler, and had issue by both

Darnley died of lockjaw after an axe injury when felling timber on his estate at Cobham Hall, Kent, in February 1835, aged 39, and was buried at Cobham. He was succeeded in the earldom by his eldest son, John. Bligh's 'town library' was sold at auction by Wheatley in London on 20 July 1836 (and four following days); a copy of the catalogue is held at Cambridge University Library (shelfmark Munby.c.154(1)).

His wife, Emma, Dowager Countess of Darnley, died on 15 March 1884.

== See also ==
- Earl of Darnley

Parliament of the United Kingdom
Preceded by John Baker; Stephen Rumbold Lushington	Member of Parliament for Canterbury; 1818–1830; With: Stephen Rumbold Lushington	Succeeded by Richard Watson; Viscount Fordwich
Honorary titles
New office	Lord Lieutenant of Meath; 1831–1835	Succeeded by The Lord Dunsany
Peerage of Ireland
Preceded by John Bligh	Earl of Darnley; 1831–1835	Succeeded by John Stuart Bligh
