= Florence Bligh, Countess of Darnley =

Australian-born British noble (c. 1860–1944)

The Right Honourable The Countess of Darnley DBE
- Born: Florence Rose Morphy c. 1860; Colony of Victoria
- Died: 30 August 1944 (aged 83–84); Henley-on-Thames, Oxfordshire, England
- Spouse: Ivo Bligh, 8th Earl of Darnley (m. 1884; died 1927)
- Children: 3
- Parent: John Stephen Morphy

Florence Rose Bligh, Countess of Darnley, DBE (née Morphy; c. 1860 – 30 August 1944) was the Australian-born wife of Ivo Bligh, 8th Earl of Darnley.

== Early life ==
Florence Rose Morphy was born in Victoria, daughter of John Stephen Morphy, sometime police magistrate at Beechworth, who died in July 1861. She met Ivo Bligh at Rupertswood, where she was the Clarke family's governess, when he captained the English cricket team that visited Australia in 1882–83.

According to one report, she was the leader of the Melbourne ladies who presented Bligh with "a tiny silver urn, containing what they termed 'the ashes of Australian cricket.'" (There is reason to believe, from that description and other records, that more than one "Ashes urn" came into being over time, the one she gave to the MCC after her husband's death in 1927 being of terracotta, not apparently silvered.)

== Career ==
In 1902 the Countess of Darnley co-wrote, with Randolph Hodgson, a romantic novel titled Elma Trevor. In the novel, the eponymous heroine, "loved by one man ... marrie[s] another, and in the end discovers that she is made for a third". Also in 1902, under the pen-name "Hildred Codrington", she wrote a religious novel, The Silvery Dawn, "written for the purpose of illustrating the power of righteousness and truthfulness as principles of human action". She also wrote hymns under the same pen-name.

During the First World War she and her husband set aside the state apartments of their home, Cobham Hall in Kent, to accommodate 50 Australian officers. Lady Florence was created a Dame Commander of the Order of the British Empire in 1919.

== Personal life ==
Florence and Ivo Bligh, 8th Earl of Darnley (1859–1927) were married in St. Mary's Church, Sunbury, with the reception held at Rupertswood, near Melbourne, Australia on 9 February 1884. In 1900, when her husband succeeded to the title of Earl of Darnley, she became Countess of Darnley. Together, they were the parents of:

- Esme Ivo Bligh, 9th Earl of Darnley (1886–1955), who married Daphne Rachel Mulholland, the only daughter of Hon. Alfred John Mulholland (third son of John Mulholland, 1st Baron Dunleath), in 1912. They divorced in 1920 and she married Col. Hugo Henry Chandor of Worlingham Hall in 1921.
- Lt.-Col. Hon. Noel Gervase Bligh (1888–1984), who married Mary Jack Frost, a daughter of Capt. George Alfred Frost, in 1912. After their divorce in 1934, he married Dorothy Millicent Isabella Munroe, the former wife of Caryl Henry Courthorpe (nee Bevan) Munroe and daughter of Hubert Lee Bevan, in 1934. Following her death in 1972, he married thirdly to Mrs. Kathleen Weatherill Strickland.
- Lady Dorothy Violet Bligh (1893–1976), who married Capt. Daniel Spencer Peploe of Charcroft Farm, Brewham, eldest son and heir of Daniel Henry Theophilus Peploe DL of Garnstone Castle, in 1916.

Lord Darnley died on 10 April 1927 and was succeeded in the earldom by their eldest son, Esme Ivo. Lady Darnley died on 30 August 1944 in Henley-on-Thames, Oxfordshire, and was buried in the collegiate church of St Mary Magdalene, Cobham, Kent. The couple's grave was rededicated in May 2011.
