= Ivo Bligh, 8th Earl of Darnley =

English cricketer

The Right Honourable The Earl of Darnley JP DL
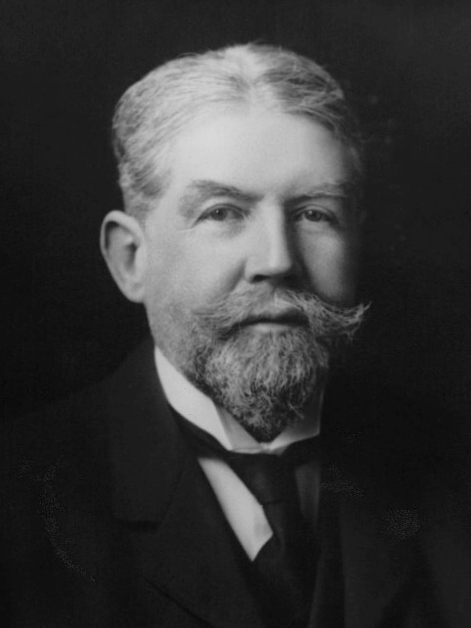
- Bligh pictured in about 1910

Personal information
- Full name: Ivo Francis Walter Bligh
- Born: 13 March 1859; Westminster, London
- Died: 10 April 1927 (aged 68); Shorne, Kent
- Batting: Right-handed

International information
- National side: England (1882–1883)
- Test debut (cap 38): 30 December 1882 v Australia
- Last Test: 21 February 1883 v Australia

Domestic team information
- Years: Team
- 1877–1883: Kent
- 1878–1881: Cambridge University

Career statistics
Competition	Test	First-class
Matches	4	84
Runs scored	62	2,733
Batting average	10.33	20.70
100s/50s	0/0	2/12
Top score	19	113*
Catches/stumpings	7/–	81/–
- Source: CricInfo, 22 September 2008

Blazon of Bligh coat of arms (present Earls of Darnley): Azure, a Griffin segreant Or armed and langued Gules between three Crescents Argent

Ivo Francis Walter Bligh, 8th Earl of Darnley JP DL (13 March 1859 – 10 April 1927), styled The Honourable Ivo Bligh until 1900, lord of the manor of Cobham, Kent, was a British nobleman, parliamentarian and cricketer.

Bligh captained the England team in the first ever Test cricket series against Australia with The Ashes at stake in 1882/83. Later in life, he inherited the earldom of Darnley and sat at Westminster as an elected Irish representative peer.

== Background and education ==
Bligh was born in London, the second son of John Bligh, 6th Earl of Darnley, by Lady Harriet Mary, daughter of Henry Pelham, 3rd Earl of Chichester. He was educated at Cheam School, Eton and Trinity College, Cambridge, graduating BA in 1882. At Cambridge, he was secretary of the University Pitt Club. and played for Cambridge against Oxford in the Real Tennis Varsity Match of 1880.

== Cricket career ==
Although the history of Test cricket between England and Australia dates from 1877, it was after an English team led by A. N. Hornby lost to the Australians at The Oval in 1882, that The Sporting Times newspaper wrote a mock obituary to English cricket, noting that the body would be cremated and the ashes sent to Australia. The following winter's tour to Australia was billed as an attempt to reclaim The Ashes. Bligh's team was successful, winning the three-match Ashes series two-one, although a fourth game, not played for The Ashes, and hence a matter of great dispute, was lost.

A small terracotta urn was presented to Bligh, as England captain, by a group of Melbourne women after England's victory in the Test series. The urn is reputed to contain the ashes of a bail, symbolising "the ashes of English cricket". While the urn has come to symbolise The Ashes series, the term "The Ashes" predates the existence of the urn. The urn is not used as the trophy for the Ashes series, and, whichever side "holds" the Ashes, the urn remains in the MCC Museum at Lord's. Since the 1998/99 Ashes series, a Waterford crystal trophy has been presented to the winners.

Bligh is commemorated by a poem inscribed on the side of the urn:

When Ivo goes back with the urn, the urn;
Studds, Steel, Read and Tylecote return, return;
The welkin will ring loud,
The great crowd will feel proud,
Seeing Barlow and Bates with the urn, the urn;
And the rest coming home with the urn.

Bligh also played for Cambridge University and Kent in a first-class cricket career which lasted from 1877 to 1883. He was elected President of the Marylebone Cricket Club for 1900/01 and of Kent County Cricket Club in 1892 and 1902.

== Public offices ==
Bligh succeeded his elder brother Edward as Earl of Darnley in 1900. As the holder of an Irish peerage he was not automatically entitled to a seat in the House of Lords (his brother's English peerage, the barony of Clifton, had passed to Edward's daughter Elizabeth), but was elected as soon as was practicable, in March 1905, to sit in Parliament as an Irish representative peer.

The year after his succession to the family titles, Lord Darnley was appointed a deputy lieutenant and justice of the peace for Kent. He was appointed Honorary Colonel of the 4th Volunteer Battalion, The Queen's Own (Royal West Kent Regiment) on 16 July 1902.

== Personal life ==
He married Florence Rose Morphy, daughter of John Stephen Morphy, of Beechworth, Victoria, Australia on 9 February 1884. She had been a music teacher at Rupertswood, where her future husband had stayed during his tour of Australia. They had two sons and a daughter:

- Esmé Bligh, 9th Earl of Darnley (1886–1955)
- Hon. Noel Gervase Bligh (14 November 1888 – 1984), married Mary Jack Frost and had issue
- Lady Dorothy Violet Bligh (8 February 1893 – 16 January 1976)

In 1884, he became a Christian through Dwight L. Moody's preaching, after C. T. Studd invited him to attend Moody's campaign meeting.

He served as the President of the Marylebone Cricket Club in 1900.

Lord Darnley died at Shorne, Kent in April 1927, aged 68, being succeeded in the family titles by his eldest son, Esmé. His wife, 'Florence, Dowager Countess of Darnley', presented the urn to the Marylebone Cricket Club (MCC) after her husband's death. She died in August 1944, having been honoured as one of the first Dames of the British Empire in 1919.

Ivo Bligh is buried in the family vault at the collegiate church of St Mary Magdalene, Cobham, Kent.

== Art collection ==
As owner of the art collection at Cobham Hall from 1900, he lent various pieces to London exhibitions, but in May 1925 he sold 92 paintings at auction at Christie's.

== See also ==
- History of Test cricket (to 1883)
- Cobham Hall
- Earl of Darnley

Sporting positions
Preceded by A N Hornby	English national cricket captain 1882/3	Succeeded by The Lord Harris
Peerage of Ireland
Preceded by Edward Bligh	Earl of Darnley; 1900–1927	Succeeded by Esme Bligh
Parliament of the United Kingdom
Preceded by The Earl de Montalt	Representative peer for Ireland; 1906–1927	Office lapsed
