= Cainnear (name) =

Cainder/Cainnear
- Pronunciation: KON-er/ KOIN-er
- Gender: female
- Name day: 28 January

Other gender
- Masculine: Cainneach
- Feminine: Cainder/Cainnear

Origin
- Origin: Irish
- Meaning: kind, gentle or attractive daughter from the Irish caoin 'gentle' and der 'daughter'

Other names
- Alternative spelling: Cainder
- Variant forms: Cainder, Cainner, Cainer, Cainir, Cannera, Cainneir, Conaire, Connera
- Popularity: see popular names

Cainnear is a female Irish given name. Potentially deriving from caoin and der, meaning "gentle daughter", it is the name of one of the legendary daughters of Queen Medb of Connacht and several Irish saints. Variants of the name include Canair, Cainder, and Cainner, and at least two early Christian saints have borne these variants.

== Bearers of variants of the name ==
- Cainer (or Cainder), a daughter of Queen Medbh; and the wife of Lugaid son of Curoi. Also called Red Cainnear, she was killed with a spear, saving her mother.
- St. Cainnear of Inis Cathaig, who is also referred to as 'St. Canair of Bantry Bay', is associated in some sources with Senán mac Geirrcinn of Scattery Island.
- St. Cainner of Rinn-hAllaidh, an early Irish virgin saint. Her feast day is 5 November.
- St. Cainnear of Cluain Claraid, an Irish virgin and an abbess who was healed of muteness by St. Brendan.
- Cainnear of Clonsilla (Cainer of Cluain-da-Saileach), the mother of St. Mochua of Clondalkin and six other male saints.
- St. Cinnera of Kirkinner, a Scottish virgin, associated with Kirkinner, who was a recluse and possibly also a martyr. Her feast day is 29 October.
- St. Cainnere of Cill Chainre (Kilcandra, County Wicklow).

== See also ==
- Cainnech (given name)
- List of Irish-language given names
