= Cainnear (saint) =

Irish saint

Saint Cainnear or Cannera of Cluain Claraidh
- Born: c. 6th century AD
- Died: unknown Cluain Claraidh (unknown location)

Saint Cainnear (Cainder, Cannera) was an obscure Irish 6th-century saint mentioned in the life of Saint Moluag. Described as the "foundress of Cluain Cláraid", she was a first cousin of Brendan of Clonfert who healed her of muteness when she was sixteen years old. Little else is known about her except that she later became a nun and the foundress of a nunnery at Cluain Claraid of unknown locality. According to her entry in the Dictionary of Irish Biography, the date of Cainner's death is "not recorded".

She is not to be confused with the more famous St. Cainnear of Bantry and Scattery Island.

== See also ==
- Cainnear (name)
