= DWWR 42 =

Three Irish tank locomotives

DW&WR 42
Type and origin
- Power type: Steam
- Designer: William Wakefield
- Builder: Beyer, Peacock & Company
- Build date: 1883
- Total produced: 3
Specifications
- Configuration
  - Whyte: 2-4-0T
- Gauge: 5 ft 3 in (1,600 mm)
- Leading dia.: 3 ft 10 in (1,170 mm)
- Driver dia.: 5 ft 1 1/2 in (1,562 mm)
- Axle load: 14.95 long tons (15.19 t)
- Loco weight: 29.9 long tons (30.4 t)
- Water cap.: 900 imp gal (4,100 L; 1,100 US gal)
- Boiler pressure: 145 lbf/in^{2} (1.00 MPa)
- Cylinders: 2
- Cylinder size: 16 in × 22 in (406 mm × 559 mm)
Performance figures
- Tractive effort: 11,290 lbf (50.22 kN)
Career
- Operators: DW&WR; DSER; GSR
- Class: G1 (Inchicore)
- Power class: O/N T
- Number in class: 11
- Numbers: 42–44
- Locale: Ireland
- Withdrawn: 1925-1927
- Disposition: All scrapped

DW&WR 42 to 44, built in 1883, were a set of three 2-4-0T tank locomotives built by Beyer, Peacock & Company for the Dublin, Wicklow & Wexford Railway in 1883, and the first for the railway with side tanks. For their size they were considered to be very capable. In particular No. 44 was overhauled at Dundalk works in 1923 and was regularly allocated then to the 5.15pm Greystones express which usually consisted of size bogie coaches. Upon amalgamation to the Great Southern Railways (GSR) in 1925 it was determined these locomotives would be withdrawn and they were not allocated GSR locomotive numbers or class codes however despite this No. 44 was permitted to run up to 1927. (Note: The rebuilding of five 2-4-2Ts in 1925 and 1926 would have helped towards ease the severe motive power shortage in the former DSER suburban area at this time and explain while No. 44 was kept until 1927.)

No further 2-4-0Ts were built for DW&WR by Beyer-Peacock but locomotive superintendent William Wakefield chose to construct 11 more of the 2-4-0T configuration at Grand Canal Street from 1885.
