= Theodosia Blachford =

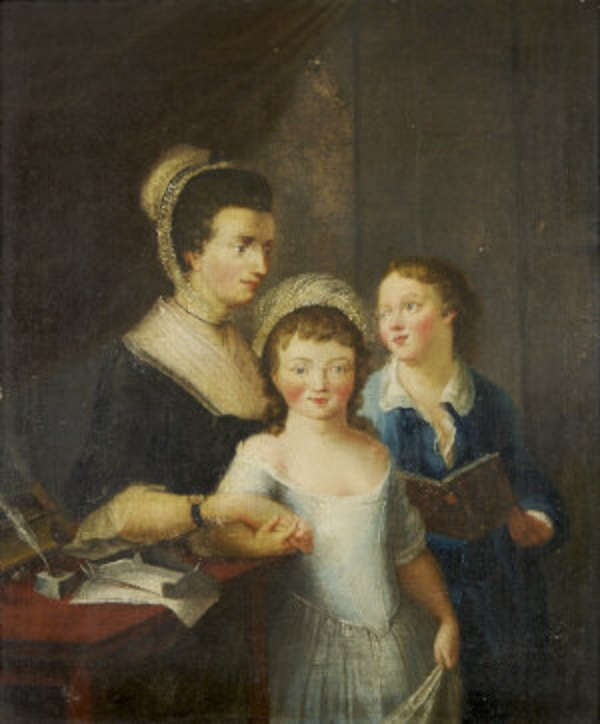
- Blachford self portrait with her children c.1780
- Born: Theodosia Tighe; 1744; Rosanna, County Wicklow
- Died: 9 November 1817 (aged 72–73)
- Known for: conversion to Methodism

Theodosia Blachford (1744 – 9 November 1817) was an Irish philanthropist and leading figure in the Methodist Church in Ireland.

== Early life ==
Theodosia Blachford was born Theodosia Tighe in 1744 in Rosanna, County Wicklow. She was the only daughter of the four children of William Tighe and his first wife Lady Mary Tighe of Rathmore, County Meath. Her three full brothers were William, Edward, and Richard. Her maternal grandparents were John Bligh, 1st Earl of Darnley and Theodosia Bligh, 10th Baroness Clifton.

Lady Tighe died when Blachford was young, and her father went on to marry the heiress Margaret Theaker, through whom she had a half-brother, Thomas, and half-sister, Barbara. Initially the relationship between Blachford and her stepmother was difficult, but improved over time.

Blachford was considered an intelligent child, well-read and seen to have largely educated herself using her father's library. Aside from her self-directed education, Blachford spent much of her childhood caring for her father while he suffered from gout. She was raised in the Church of Ireland, but was inspired to find a new religion at age of 17, leading her to read extensively on religious matters and to "renounce the world."

== Marriage and conversion to Methodism ==
In 1770 she married Rev. William Blachford, prebendary to Tassasagart. Rev. Blachford was a librarian to St Patrick's and the Marsh libraries in Dublin. She was widowed in May 1773, and was left with a young son and daughter. She oversaw the education of her daughter, Mary Tighe, who grew up to be a poet. Around 1775 she converted to Methodism, this was potentially driven by her bereavement or through the influence of Agnes Smyth. She attended the Whitefriar Street Church, and given her position in society was a prominent figure in the Dublin Methodist community. In June 1788, John Wesley called her "one of our jewels" in correspondence. Blachford wrote a number of religious tracts and translated the life of Jane Frances de Chantal, founder of the Visitation Order. Her sister-in-law, Sarah Tighe (1743–1820), also converted to Methodism.

== Philanthropy ==
Though Blachford was relatively wealthy, she lived a frugal life, donating much of her extra income to charity. She donated to the Magadalen Asylum on Leeson Street, and was involved in the foundation of the Female Orphan House in 1790 and the House of Refuge on Baggot Street in 1802. Both were founded to assist homeless and unemployed young women. She is also believed to have personally educated a number of impoverished girls. She referred to this work as a "providential blessing" that "saves me from stupid indolence".

== Later life and death ==
She did not approve of her daughter's marriage to her first cousin Henry Tighe, and strongly disapproved of her frivolous lifestyle. Regardless, she spent a large amount of her time in England with her daughter, nursing her through a long illness and eventual death of tuberculosis in 1810. She briefly outlived her son John, dying on 9 November 1817. It is unknown where she is buried.

Her correspondence with her children is held in the National Library of Ireland.
