= William Blachford =

William Blachford (1730–1773) was the father of poet Mary Tighe; from 1766 to 1773 he was librarian of Marsh's Library, Dublin.

Blachford was the eldest son of Dr John Blachford, prebendary of Wicklow and his wife Elinor (née Acton) from Kilcandra, county Wicklow. He was an alumnus of Trinity College Dublin and an Anglican priest. In 1770 he married Theodosia Tighe (1744–1817) from Wicklow; their children were John (born 1771) and Mary (born 9 October 1772).

He died in 1773.

== Sources ==
- "Mary Tighe (Mrs Henry Tighe) (1772–1810)" in The Literary Encyclopedia
- Muriel McCarthy, Marsh's Library: All Graduates and Gentlemen. 2nd ed. Dublin: Four Courts Press, 2003
