= Mary Tighe =

Anglo-Irish poet

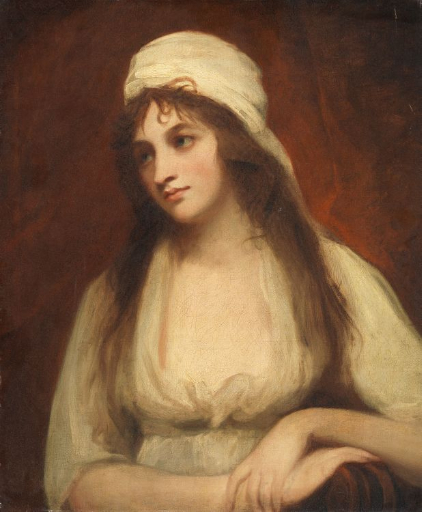
- Portrait by George Romney
- Born: 9 October 1772; Dublin, Ireland
- Died: 24 March 1810 (aged 37); County Wicklow, Ireland
- Occupation: Poet
- Writing career
- Period: 1805–1810

Mary Tighe (9 October 1772 – 24 March 1810) was an Irish poet.

== Life and career ==
Mary Blachford (or Blanchford) (or Blackford) was born in Dublin, 9 October 1772. Her parents were Theodosia Tighe, a Methodist leader, and William Blachford (d.1773?), a Church of Ireland clergyman and librarian. She had a strict religious upbringing, and when she was twenty-one she married Henry Tighe (1768–1836), her first cousin and a member of the Parliament of Ireland for Inistioge, County Kilkenny. The marriage is said to have been unhappy, though little is known.

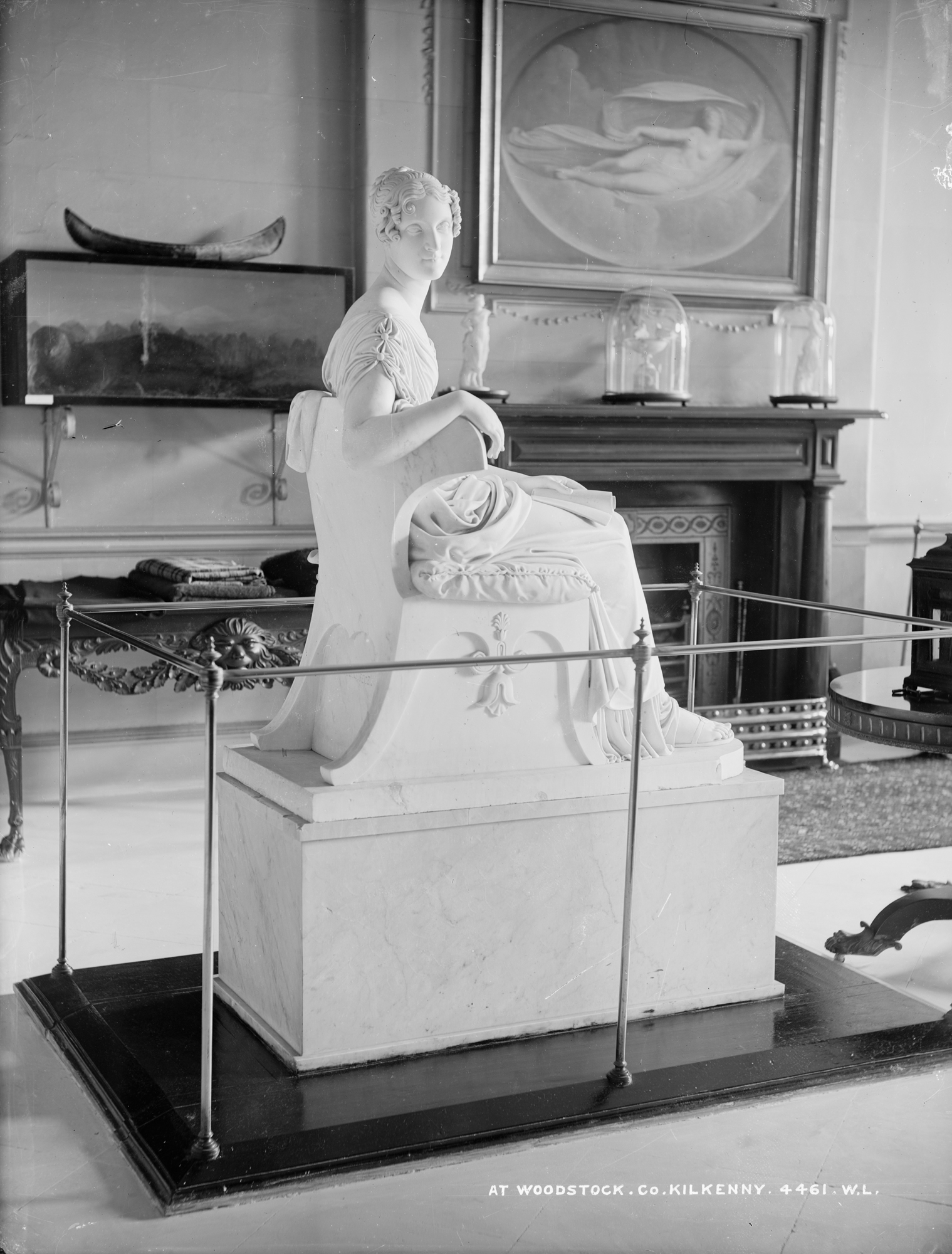
Statue of Mary Tighe, held at Woodstock House after her death

The couple moved to London in the early nineteenth century. She became acquainted with Thomas Moore, an early admirer of her writing, and others interested in literature. Although she had written since girlhood, she published nothing until Psyche (1805), a six-canto allegorical poem in Spenserian stanzas. Psyche was admired by many and praised by Moore in his poem, "To Mrs. Henry Tighe on reading her Psyche".

Having suffered for at least a year, Mary Tighe endured a serious attack of tuberculosis in 1805. In February 1805 Moore states that she had "a very serious struggle for life" and in August of the same year that she was 'ordered to the Madeiras'. Moore also claimed that "another winter will inevitably be her death". Tighe lived for another five years and spent her last few months as an invalid at her brother-in-law's estate in Woodstock, County Kilkenny, Ireland. She was buried in the church at nearby Inistioge. Her diary was destroyed, though a cousin had copied out excerpts.

The year following her death, a new edition of Psyche was released, along with some previously unpublished poems; it was this edition that established her literary reputation. John Keats was one of her admirers and paid tribute to her in his poem, "To Some Ladies". Pam Perkins writes that "[d]espite the bleakness of many of the short poems in the 1811 volume, in much of the nineteenth-century writing on Tighe there is a tendency to make her an exemplar of patiently (and picturesquely) long-suffering femininity, a tendency exemplified most famously in Felicia Hemans's tribute to her, 'The Grave of a Poetess'."

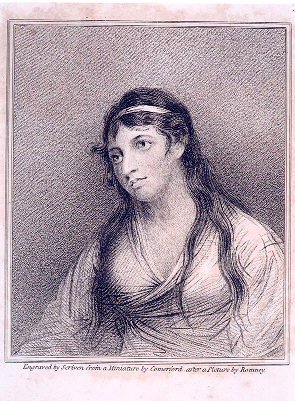
Frontispiece from the 1816 edition of her Psyche, with Other Poems.

A statue of her was sculpted by Lorenzo Bartolini, and was held at Woodstock House until it was burned down in 1922. According to the Uffizi, the statue was commissioned by her son after her death, and was delivered to Ireland around 1820.

== Psyche ==
"Psyche, or the legend of love" is Mary Tighe's rendition of the Greco-Roman folktale of Cupid and Psyche, which is recorded in The Golden Ass (or Metamorphoses) by Lucius Apuleius, the Silver Age Roman author. Psyche, or the Legend of Love was privately printed in a run of only 50 copies in 1805. It was republished posthumously in 1811 with other, previously unpublished works by Longman, London.

The story is about a princess named Psyche who is so beautiful that the people of her kingdom begin to worship her as the goddess Venus. Venus becomes envious of the attention that Psyche receives and sends her son Cupid to Psyche to make her fall in love with a monster. Instead Cupid falls in love with Psyche, and marries her without his mother's knowledge. He whisks her away to a far-away palace, where she is served by invisible servants, and he visits her only at night, so she cannot discover his true identity. One night Psyche's curiosity gets the better of her, and after he falls asleep she lights a lamp to see her husband's face. When she realises her husband is no monster, rather a god, she is so surprised a drop of oil falls from her lamp and burns Cupid, waking him. He flees, and to regain her husband Psyche seeks the help of his mother Venus, who sends her out to complete various tasks in penance. In her final task, she is sent to retrieve a box from the underworld containing some of Proserpina's beauty. Although instructed not to look inside the box, she opens it, and Psyche is overcome by a never-ending sleep. Cupid saves her, and in the end Psyche is transformed into a goddess herself by Jupiter.

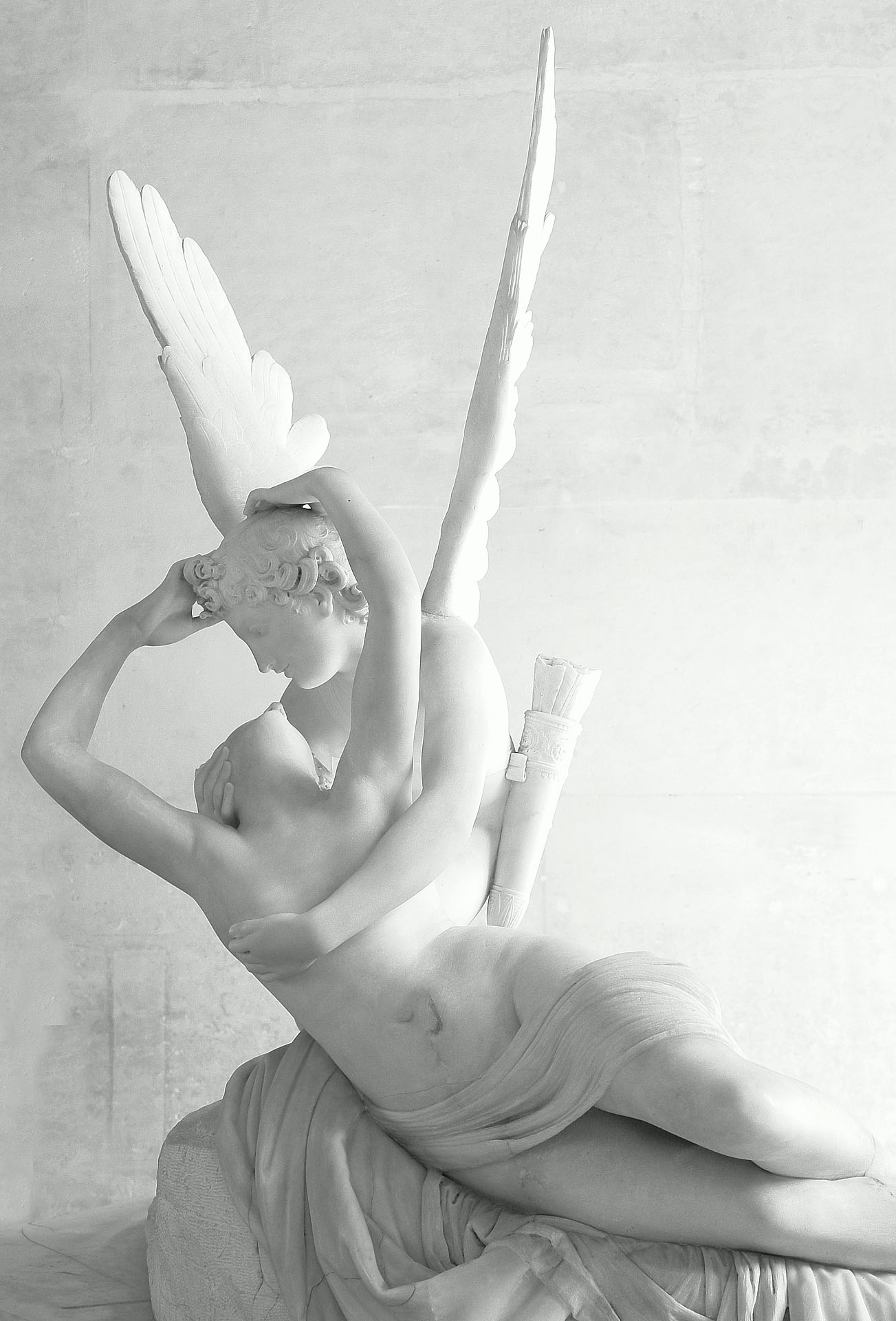
Psyché

The bulk of Tighe's version of the story is taken from Apuleius, but her poem, written in Spenserian stanzas, is riddled with small details which point to Cupid's and Psyche's shared characteristics and equal standing, implying that their love is mutual, and this idea is taken further in the heavily adapted second half of the epic, where Cupid joins Psyche on her penitent journey. In the first encounter between the two lovers, Tighe mirrors a passage from Apuleius but reverses the roles, showing the similarities between the two. As Cupid comes to Psyche at his mother's request, ready to use his love-inducing arrows, he leans over her, but is then overcome by her beauty and:

The dart which in his hand now trembling stood,
As o'er the couch he bent with ravished eye,
Drew with its daring point celestial blood
From his smooth neck's unblemished ivory: (canto 1, 244–247).

Much of the same imagery is found in the Metamorphoses, but later in Apuleius’ narrative, as Psyche is overcome at the sight of Cupid and the weapons that testify to his divinity. Tighe was familiar with the ancient novel, so this similarity is likely deliberate. In his novel, Apuleius wrote:

Now Psyche, with her insatiable mind, examined these with more than a little curiosity, and as she was studying and admiring the weapons of her husband, trembling she drew one arrow from the quiver to test the point on the tip of her thumb, but she pressed too deeply, so that tiny drops of rosy-red blood dotted her skin like dew. Thus did unknowing Psyche suddenly fall in love with Love, burning more and more with desire for Desire. (Apuleius, Metamorphoses, 5.23).

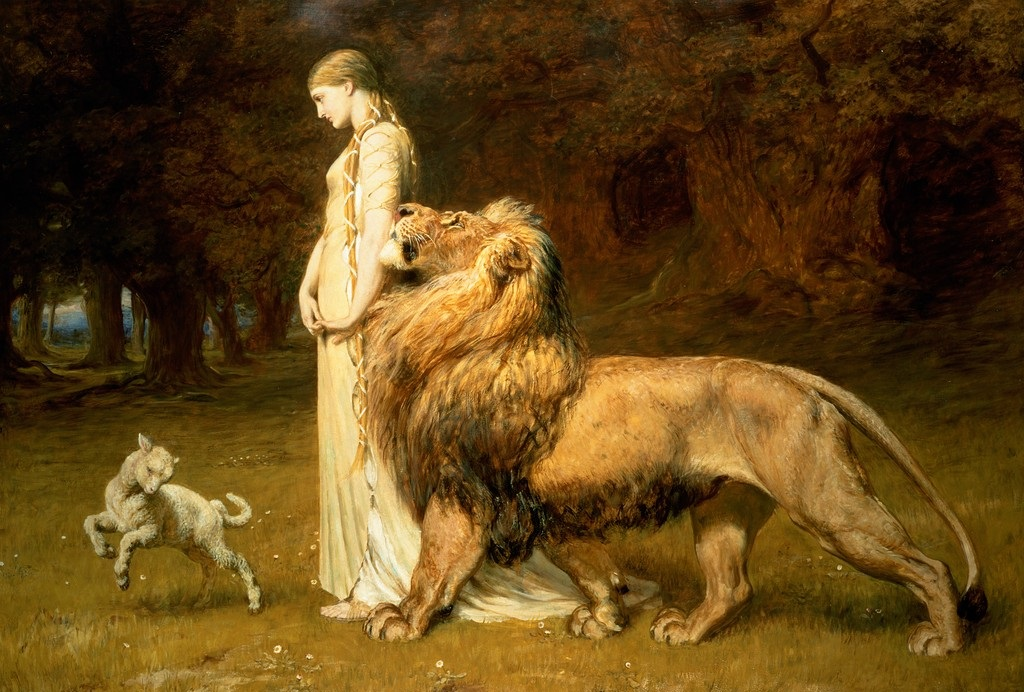
Una and the Lion by Briton Rivière

The many similarities between the two passages strengthen the relationship and the comparison between the two figures. Arrows are held with “trembling” hands, blood stains perfect skin, and neither is aware of the fateful prick. In Tighe's version, Cupid is as much a victim of himself as Psyche is, and she makes explicit that her feelings are mutual. In a major departure from Apuleius’ storyline, Cupid accompanies Psyche on her series of trials, disguised as a white knight on his own journey to regain his beloved. This unique element of Tighe's narrative serves to emphasise the equal responsibility of both genders in romantic relationships. When the white knight first introduces himself to Psyche, hiding his true identity as Cupid, he tells her:

“I too (he said) divided from my love,
“The offended power of Venus deprecate,
“Like thee, through paths untrodden, sadly rove
“In search of that fair spot prescribed by fate,
“The blessed term of my afflicted state,” (canto 3, 127–131).

By describing him thus, Cupid becomes a male version of Psyche, needing to perform his own series of trials to become worthy of his lover. The tasks Venus sends them to do cease to be a form of penance and become a mutual journey, and both lovers grow as individuals, helping each other to defeat various vices and temptations, in a very moralising and Christian version of the Roman tale.

She also makes allusions to Spencer's Fairie Queene during Psyche's final task set by Venus. "A cruel monster now her steps pursued, Well known of yore and named the Blatant Beast.

== Other works ==
- Selena (unpublished novel). The manuscript is held in the National Library of Ireland. It is available online: Tighe, Mary, and Harriet K. Linkin. Selena. Farnham, Surrey, England: Ashgate, 2012. print and online access.
- Mary: a Series of Reflections during 20 Years (Posthumous; edited and privately printed by her brother-in-law, William Tighe, 1811)
