= Élie Bouhéreau =

French Irish physician and librarian (1643–1719)

- Born: 5 May 1643; La Rochelle, Kingdom of France
- Died: 19 March 1719 (aged 75); Ireland
- Other name: Elias Bouhéreau
- Education: Academy of Saumur
- Spouse: Marguerite Massiot.
- Children: 10

Élie Bouhéreau (Note: Also cited as Elias Bouhéreau.) (5 May 1643 – 19 March 1719) was a French and Irish physician, bibliophile, librarian, cleric and diarist. A Huguenot refugee, Bouhéreau settled in Dublin where he became the inaugural librarian of Marsh's Library.

== Early life ==
Bouhéreau was born on 15 May 1643 in La Rochelle, Kingdom of France to Élie Bouhéreau, the pastor of Fontenay, and Blandine Bouhéreau (née Richard). Raised in an upper-class Huguenot family, Bouhéreau studied theology at the Academy of Saumur until 1659 when he left for Paris. Bouhéreau enrolled at the University of Orange in 1664 to study medicine, graduating with his Medical degree in 1667.

== Career ==
Bouhéreau, according to the burial register of the Conformist Huguenot churches in Dublin, was a "distinguished medical doctor and zealous Protestant of La Rochelle, very knowledgeable and very highly regarded." He was also a scholar, and published a French translation of the third century Christian work Contra Celsus. After the Revocation of the Edict of Nantes Bouhéreau fled to England. He travelled in Europe between 1689 and 1692 as personal secretary of Thomas Coxe, the king's envoy to the Swiss cantons, and again between 1694 and 1696 as personal secretary to the Marquis de Ruvigny, commander-in-chief of English forces in Piedmont. He served in Ireland with Ruvigny (then earl of Galway) when the latter was Lord Justice of Ireland, 1697-1701. In 1701 he was made librarian of Marsh's Library. From the time of his first journey in 1689 to his death he kept a diary, which is kept in the Library.

== Conservation work ==
Bouhéreau had with him documents from the Reformed Church of France, which he had brought from La Rochelle to save them from destruction. They were deposited at Marsh's library, the governors stipulating "that they were to be kept until such time as the same shall be demanded by the said Reformed Church." In 1760 John Wynne, the third librarian, expressed himself "apprehensive lest the papists might have access to make bad use of or destroy them." They were finally returned to the Consistory of La Rochelle in 1862. There are still many works in Bouhéreau's collection in the library that deal with French Huguenot history, including the manuscript of Joseph Guillaudeau's Journal of What Passed at La Rochelle 1584-1643.

== Personal life ==
Bouhéreau was married to a cousin, Marguerite Massiot. They had ten children, of whom eight survived. His son John was ordained a minister, became a Doctor of Divinity and was the first assistant librarian of Marsh's Library. Marguerite died on 22 May 1704. Her death occasioned an emotional entry in an otherwise factual diary.

One of the sons, Richard was Town Major (police chief) of Dublin. His son Richard changed his surname to Borough. That Richard's son, of the same name, was the first of the Borough baronets, from 1813.
