= DWWR 11 =

Irish Rail locomotive

DW&WR 11
Type and origin
- Power type: Steam
- Designer: William Wakefield; R. Cronin
- Builder: Grand Canal Street
- Build date: 1896
Specifications
- Configuration
  - Whyte: 2-4-2T
- Gauge: 5 ft 3 in (1,600 mm)
- Leading dia.: 3 ft 9 in (1,140 mm)
- Driver dia.: 5 ft 6 in (1,680 mm)
- Trailing dia.: 3 ft 9 in (1,140 mm)
- Length: 33 ft 6 in (10,210 mm)
- Axle load: 14.5 long tons (14.7 t)
- Loco weight: 52 long tons (53 t)
- Water cap.: 1,500 imp gal (6,800 L; 1,800 US gal)
- Boiler pressure: 160 lbf/in^{2} (1.10 MPa)
- Cylinders: 2
- Cylinder size: 17 in × 24 in (432 mm × 610 mm)
Performance figures
- Tractive effort: 14,300 lbf (63.61 kN)
Career
- Operators: DW&WR; DSER; GSR; CIÉ
- Class: F1/F2 (Inchicore)
- Power class: O/N/M T
- Number in class: 12
- Numbers: 3,8,10–12,27–30,40,45,46; 428-439 (GSR/CIÉ)
- Locale: Ireland
- Withdrawn: 1925-1957
- Disposition: All scrapped
- No. 11 As built

Dublin, Wicklow and Wexford Railway (DW&WR) 11 built in 1896 was the predecessor to a total of twelve 2-4-2T locomotives to emerge from Grand Canal Street railway works between 1896 and 1910. Eleven of twelve lasted through to the early 1950s, the only loss being due to the Civil war, and despite attempts to replace them remained they remained vital to the running of the South Dublin services suburban services to Bray throughout their lives.

== Development ==
These locomotives were a development of the preceding 2-4-0Ts also by William Wakefield with the first two, No. 11 St Kevin in 1896 and No. 3 being new builds. Four more subsequently constructed by rebuilding Wakefields 2-4-0T locomotives. These were all later to form Great Southern Railways (GSR) class 428. The succeeding locomotive engineer Cronin was to build 6 more similar locomotives which were allocated GSR class 434. In practice during their lifetimes all twelve were subject to regular rebuilds with over 5 different types of boiler fitted.

They were an improvement over their 2-4-0T forebears, with coal capacity up from 1.5 tons to 2.5 tons and water capacity nearly doubled to 1,500 imp gal (6,800 L; 1,800 US gal) meaning less frequent refueling. The tractive effort increase by about 2,000 lbf (8.90 kN) was also useful.

== Service ==
The locomotives served the Dublin south suburban area around the Harcourt Street and coastal lines until the rename of the DW&WR to the Dublin and South Eastern Railway (DSER) and on into the Great Southern Railways grouping in 1925. They were allocated the numbers 428—439 at this time, however No. 10, St. Senanus, was allocated a GSR number 429 but ultimately was declared a Civil War loss. The remaining eleven engines were withdrawn and scrapped in the early 1950s with two surviving until 1957.

== In film ==
No. 11 appears in the 1910 silent film The Lad from Old Ireland pulling the train that Terry O'Connor gets off at Stillorgan station.
