= DWWR 2 =

Irish rail locomotive

DW&WR 2
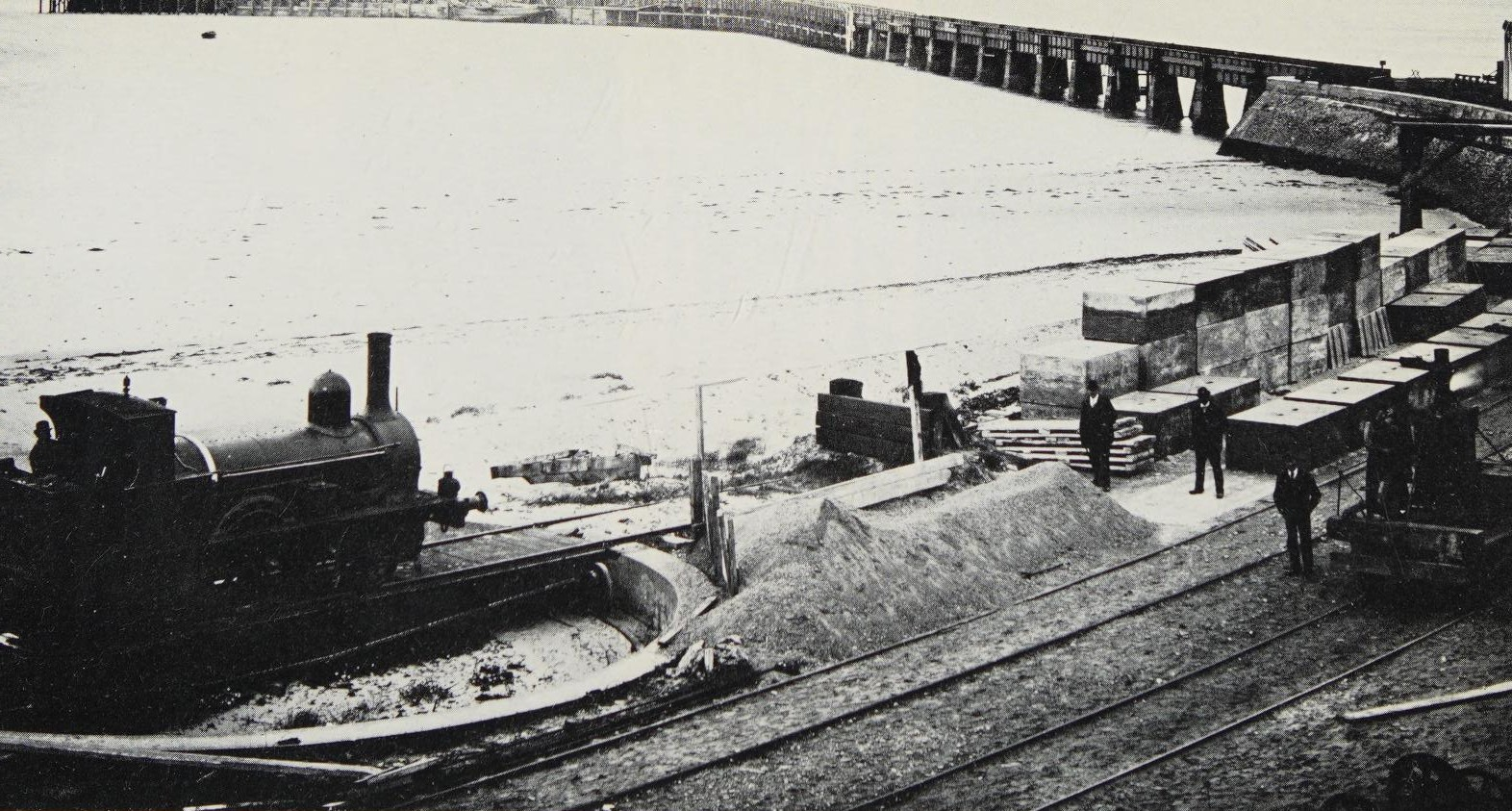
- No. 1 at Rosslare - Ballygeary Harbour, Rosslare, circa 1882.
Type and origin
- Power type: Steam
- Designer: R. Cronin
- Builder: Grand Canal Street
- Build date: 1885–1896
Specifications
- Configuration
  - Whyte: 2-4-0T
- Gauge: 5 ft 3 in (1,600 mm)
- Leading dia.: 3 ft 8 in (1,120 mm)
- Driver dia.: 5 ft 6 in (1,680 mm)
- Length: 29 ft 8 in (9,040 mm)
- Axle load: 14.5 long tons (14.7 t)
- Loco weight: 40 long tons (41 t)
- Water cap.: 800 imp gal (3,600 L; 960 US gal)
- Boiler pressure: 150 lbf/in^{2} (1.03 MPa)
- Cylinders: 2
- Cylinder size: 17 in × 24 in (432 mm × 610 mm)
Performance figures
- Tractive effort: 12,700 lbf (56.49 kN)
Career
- Operators: DW&WR; DSER; GSR; CIÉ
- Class: G1 (Inchicore)
- Power class: O/N T
- Number in class: 11
- Numbers: 1, 2, 6, 7, 9, 10, 28, 45–47, 49; 423-425 (GSR/CIÉ)
- Locale: Ireland
- Withdrawn: 1925-1955
- Disposition: All scrapped
- As re-built 1912

The Dublin, Wicklow and Wexford Railway (DW&WR) 2, built in 1885, was the predecessor to a total of eleven 2-4-0T locomotives to emerge from Grand Canal Street railway works between 1885 and 1896.

Nos. 1, 6, 7 and 10, built between 1892 and 1896, had detail differences between them, Ahrons describes them as having a more modern appearance.

Locomotive No. 10 (St. Seneanus) was rebuilt as 2-4-2T in 1903. Nos. 28 (St. Lawrence), 45 (St. Kieran), and 46 (Princess Mary) were also rebuilt later in 1909/10.

On review following amalgamation into Great Southern Railways (GSR) in 1925, Nos. 1, 2 and 6 were promptly withdrawn despite No. 2 having received a new boiler in 1914. The remaining four engines Nos. 7, 9, 47 and 49 were designated GSR class 423/G1 and allocated the numbers 426, 424, 425 and 423 respectively. Unlike the other survivors, No. 426 had not been re-boilered in 1914–1916 and it was withdrawn in 1926.
