= Marsh's Library =

Museum in Dublin, Ireland

- Leabharlann an t-Ardeadaspaig Marsh

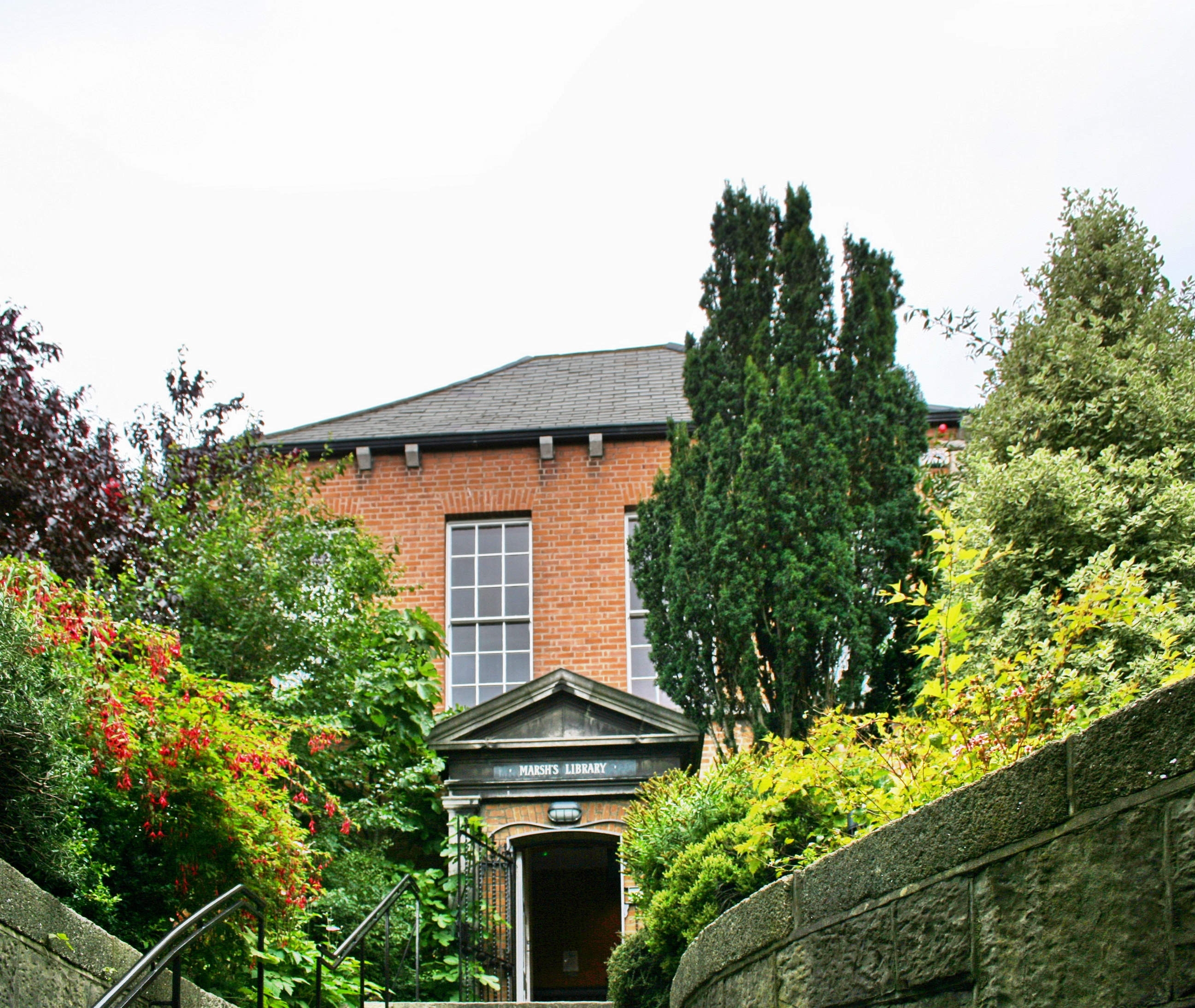
- Entrance

- Location within Central Dublin
- Former name: St Sepulchre’s Library
- Established: 1707
- Location: St Patrick's Close, Dublin, Ireland
- Coordinates: 53.338939°N 6.270485°W
- Type: public library
- Key holdings: 80 incunabula
- Collection size: 26,000 items
- Founder: Narcissus Marsh
- Architect: Sir William Robinson
- Owners: Governors and Guardians of the Library
- Public transit access: Stephen's Green Luas stop (Green Line); Kevin Street bus stop
- Website: marshlibrary.ie

Marsh's Library formerly St. Sepulchre's Library, situated in St. Patrick's Close, adjacent to St. Patrick's Cathedral and St. Sepulchre's Palace, Dublin, Ireland is a well-preserved library of the late Renaissance and early Enlightenment. When it opened to the public in 1707 it was the first public library in Ireland. It was built to the order of Archbishop Narcissus Marsh and has a collection of over 25,000 books and 300 manuscripts.

== History ==
=== Foundation ===
Marsh's Library Act 1707
- Act of Parliament
- Parliament of Ireland
- Long title: An Act for settling and preserving a public library forever in the house for that purpose built by His Grace Narcissus, now lord archbishop of Armagh, on part of the ground belonging to the archbishop of Dublin's palace near to the city of Dublin.
- Citation: 6 Anne c. 19 (I)
- Introduced by: Marmaduke Coghill (Commons)
- Territorial extent: Kingdom of Ireland

Dates
- Royal assent: 30 October 1707

The library was built for the Most Rev. Narcissus Marsh, Church of Ireland Archbishop of Dublin, and formerly Provost of Trinity College, Dublin. A plot of land belonging to St. Sepulchre's Palace adjacent to St. Patrick's Cathedral was allocated to that library to be built in 1701. Construction commenced in 1703. The First Gallery and the Old Reading Room seem to have been completed by 1705. The library was formally established by an act of the Irish Parliament, the Marsh's Library Act 1707 (6 Anne c. 19 (I)), and the Second Gallery was added in 1708 or 1709.

The design was by the then Surveyor General of Ireland, Sir William Robinson. Thomas Burgh designed an extension of the library wing and entrance porch a few years later in 1710 following Robinson's disgrace for unrelated financial impropriety and return to England.

Marsh donated his own library, which included the former library of Bishop Edward Stillingfleet, of over 10,000 volumes, regarded as one of the finest in England, which he had bought for 2,500 pounds.

Dr. Elias Bouhereau, a Huguenot refugee from La Rochelle who fled from France after the Revocation of the edict of Nantes, was the first librarian or Keeper, and also donated his personal library.

The Library was formally incorporated in 1707 by Parliament, which vested the house and books in a body known as the Governors and Guardians of the Library, comprising religious and state dignitaries and officials, and their successors still oversee it. Narcissus Marsh died in 1713, and is buried just beyond the library, in the grounds of the cathedral.

In 1745, John Stearne, Bishop of Clogher, bequeathed half of his collection of books to the library. The other half of Stearne's book collection (and all of his manuscripts) were given to Trinity College, Dublin.

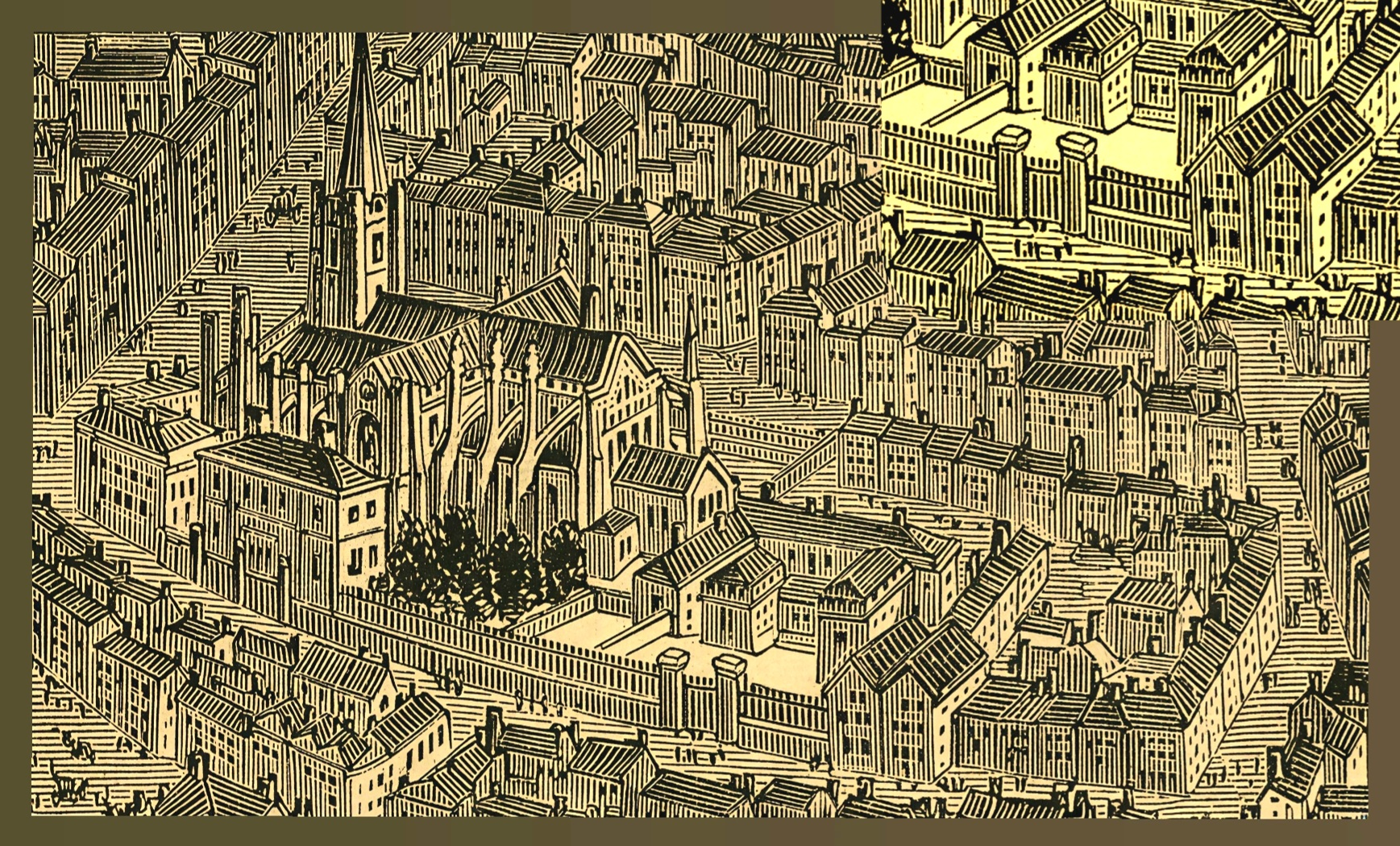
St. Sepulchre's Library, with St. Sepulchre's Palace on its right and St. Patrick's Cathedral on its left, as represented in SMYTH's bird-eye view engraving of Dublin (1846)

=== Recent history ===
In 1989, Muriel McCarthy became the first female Keeper, holding the position until her retirement in 2011. The current Keeper (now re-titled as Director) is Dr Jason McElligott, who was educated at University College Dublin and St John's College, Cambridge.

When the Guinness family sold Farmleigh House to the State, the Benjamin Iveagh Library was donated to Marsh's Library, although its documents remain housed at Farmleigh.

The catalogue of the library is online at www.marshlibrary.ie/catalogue. Scholars and students can read the books and manuscripts by appointment. Tourists come from across the world to see the old library, and in 2013 there were a total of 16,000 tourist visitors. The figure for 2014 was 17,000 visitors. 2015 saw a rise in visitors to 23,000 people.

== Holdings ==
The library contains over 25,000 books from the 16th, 17th and 18th centuries, in addition to around 300 manuscripts, and around 80 books (incunabula) from before 1501. Subjects covered include medicine, law, science, travel, navigation, mathematics, music, surveying and classical literature, and especially theology.

In addition to the eighty books dated before 1501, the Marsh collection contains four hundred and thirty books from Italy dated before 1600, twelve hundred English works produced before 1640, as well as another five thousand English books printed before 1700. Marsh's collection also includes Irish manuscripts purchased from Dudley Loftus in 1695. The Loftus acquisition included many works of Irish History, an Irish – Latin Dictionary from 1662, royal grants in Ireland from 1604 to 1631, and letters of Thady O’Doyne from 1159, 1590, and 1606. In 1941, Dean Webster donated a collection of Irish manuscripts and deeds and relating to County Cork as well as the Bishop William Reeves’ collection of books and manuscripts.

The Marsh collection includes works in oriental languages, and in Hebrew, Arabic, Turkish and Russian, as well as an important collection of Latin Judaica. The Marsh collection of Jewish texts which were primarily his own personal books contain over two hundred and fifty works of Hebrew Bibles, writings from the Talmud, rabbinic works, and Yiddish books. Many of Marsh's personal collection of Hebrew works as well as oriental texts were purchased from the estate of the Edward Stillingfleet (1635–1699), a Protestant clergyman and lecturer. The Marsh Middle Eastern personal collection is robust in Near Eastern languages, biblical studies, philosophy, astronomy, and math.

The Bouhéreau collection relates especially to France, and French religious controversies, and also medicine. The collection of Elie Bouhereau, the first librarian of the Marsh Library, donated about 1703, is quite diverse. Covering multiple subjects many of his works were gifts from authors and religious leaders such as William Molyneux, Bishop Wettenhall, and Archbishop William King. The Bouhereau medical texts were the most updated works of the day and the French History works included the Massacre of St. Bartholomew's Day and the Siege of La Rochelle.

Among the manuscripts is a volume of the Lives of the Irish Saints in Latin from ca. 1400, as well as 16th century madrigals and other musical pieces, and manuscripts on theological, legal and medical matters.

== Interior design ==
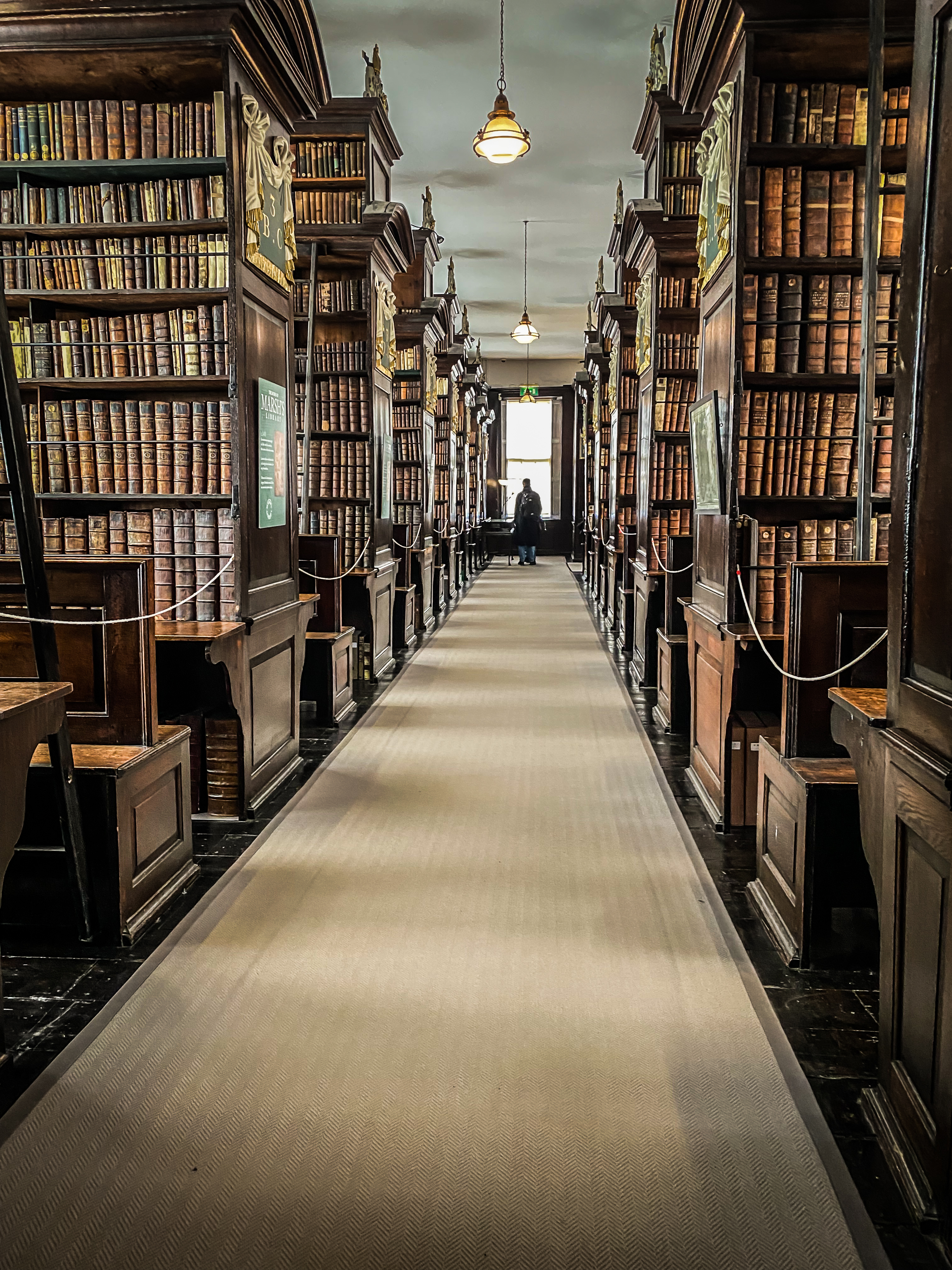
Interior.

The library still features its original fittings, including seating and shelving. The bookcases are made of quarter-plained Baltic oak with carved and lettered gables. In some of the bookcases there are bullet holes from the Easter Rising when Jacob's Biscuit factory next door was occupied. There are three wire alcoves, known as 'cages', which came into use in the 1770s in response to thefts in the library.

== Today ==
The library is one of the last 18th-century buildings in Ireland still used for its original purpose. It is open to visitors for a fee of €7, or €4 for students and senior citizens with free entry for under 18's. Please see https://www.marshlibrary.ie/visit for current opening hours.

Researchers are admitted free of charge, but must apply in advance to reserve a place in the Reading Room.

The Library holds exhibitions, and occasional conferences, and has published a range of material, primarily related to exhibitions and the catalogue.

As a charitable institution the library accepts donations, which are recorded in a special ledger which dates back to 1707.

The Library has an active social media presence, and every day posts at least one image from the collections on Instagram, Facebook and Twitter. These images give a sense of the breadth and depth of the Library holdings.

== List of Librarians ==
Below is a list of head librarians or keepers of the library.

Year	Keeper
1701-1719	Elias Bouhereau
1719-1730	Robert Dougatt
1730-1762	John Wynne
1762-1766	Thomas Cobbe
1766-1773	William Blachford
1773-1776	William Cradock
1776-1815	Thomas Cradock
1815-1841	Thomas Russell Cradock
1841-1872	Thomas Russell William Cradock
1872-1887	William Maturin
1887-1898	George Thomas Stokes
1898-1931	Newport J D White
1931-1957	Newport Benjamin White
1957-1958	Robert O Dougan
1958-1974	R. B. McDowell
1974-1979	John G Simms
1989-2011	Muriel McCarthy
2011	Jason McElligott

== See also ==
- Bolton Library
- List of libraries in the Republic of Ireland
