= Kilcandra =

Townland in Ireland

Kilcandra (Irish: Cill Chainre, meaning 'church of Cainnere or Caindere') is a small townland in the barony of Arklow and the civil parish of Dunganstown in County Wicklow, Ireland. It may be the site of an early Christian church or monastic site which was dedicated to or founded by a female saint named Cainnere. The townland, which is approximately 0.7 square kilometres (0.3 sq mi) in area, had a population of 15 people (in 5 homes) as of the 2011 census.

There is also a separate townland, in Glenealy civil parish in County Wicklow, also called Kilcandra (Irish: Coill Mhic Aindric).
