= Inis Cathaigh =

Island in Shannon Estuary, Ireland

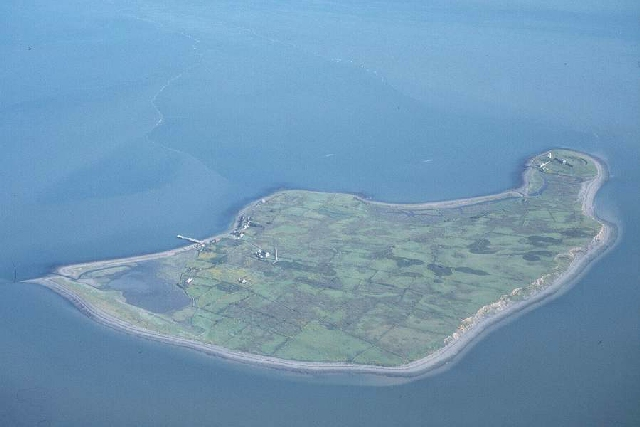

- Location within Ireland

Geography
- Location: Shannon Estuary
- Coordinates: 52°36.45′N 9°31.9′W
- Area: 0.7 km^{2} (0.27 sq mi)

Administration
- Ireland
- Province: Munster
- County: Clare

Demographics
- Population: none (permanent)
- Pop. density: 0/km^{2} (0/sq mi)

National monument of Ireland
- Reference no.: 10

Inis Cathaigh (also known as Scattery Island or Inniscattery Island) is an island in the Shannon Estuary, Ireland, off the coast of Kilrush, County Clare. The island is home to a lighthouse, a ruined monastery associated with Saints Senan and Canir, an Irish round tower and the remains of an artillery battery. The last residents left in 1969. Most of the island is now owned by the Office of Public Works, who run a small visitor centre and carry out repairs and maintenance on the island; it was bought by Dúchas in 1991.The Irish name Inis Cathaigh was formerly anglicised Iniscathy, which later became Iniscattery and finally Scattery.

== History ==
=== Saint Senan ===
Saint Senan was born at Magh Lacha, Kilrush, County Clare, ca. 488. He founded the monastery of Inis Cathaigh, which became the seat of a bishopric, sometime between 535 and 540. At an early time the abbot-bishop of the monastery was deemed to have authority over what later became the dioceses of Killaloe, Limerick and Ardfert. There are the remains of an oratory and house and of seven small churches or chapels, together with a round tower and a holy well. One of Senan's students was Aidan of Lindisfarne.

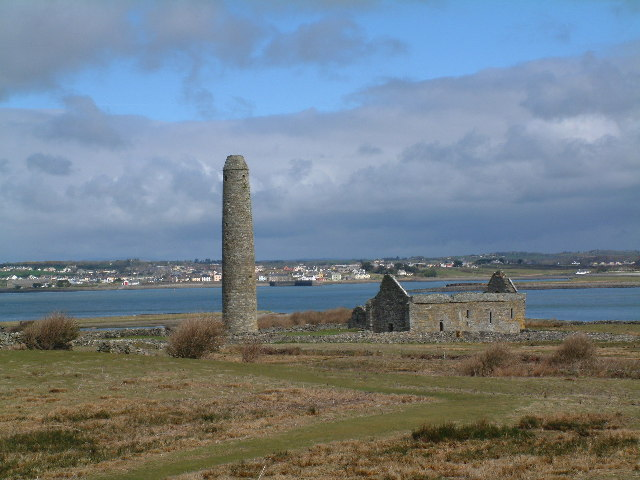
The ruins in 2004

The legend of "St Senanus and the Lady", as told in Thomas Moore's lyric, is founded on the fact that no woman was allowed on Inis Cathaigh. Yet St Senan founded two convents for nuns, and was visiting one of them when he died. According to tradition, when St Cannera or Cainnear died, she willed it that she should be buried near Senan. Senan is said to have refused, but gave in to her request because she was so stubborn. To stay true to his own edicts, Senan waited until low tide to bury her in the intertidal zone, which was not officially part of the "island", thus fulfilling his sister's wish while not breaking his own rules. St Senan died in 560 and was buried in the abbey church of Inis Cathaigh on 8 March, on which day his feast is observed.

=== Viking period ===
The Vikings first raided Inis Cathaigh in 815, killing many of the monks. The monastery was plundered repeatedly until the Vikings came to settle there themselves in the mid-tenth century. This, in turn, led to attacks by Irish kings.

Inis Cathaigh was a part of the Norse Kingdom of Limerick, which included not only Limerick itself but also several other bases in western Ireland. Given its strategic location at the mouth of the Shannon estuary, it controlled all maritime traffic up the Shannon to Limerick. The Annals of Inisfallen record that during the 970s, Norse kings of Limerick were resident at Inis Cathaigh. Ivar of Limerick, the last Norse king of the city, along with two of his sons, was slain on Inis Cathaigh by Brian Boru in 977.

=== Later ecclesiastical history ===
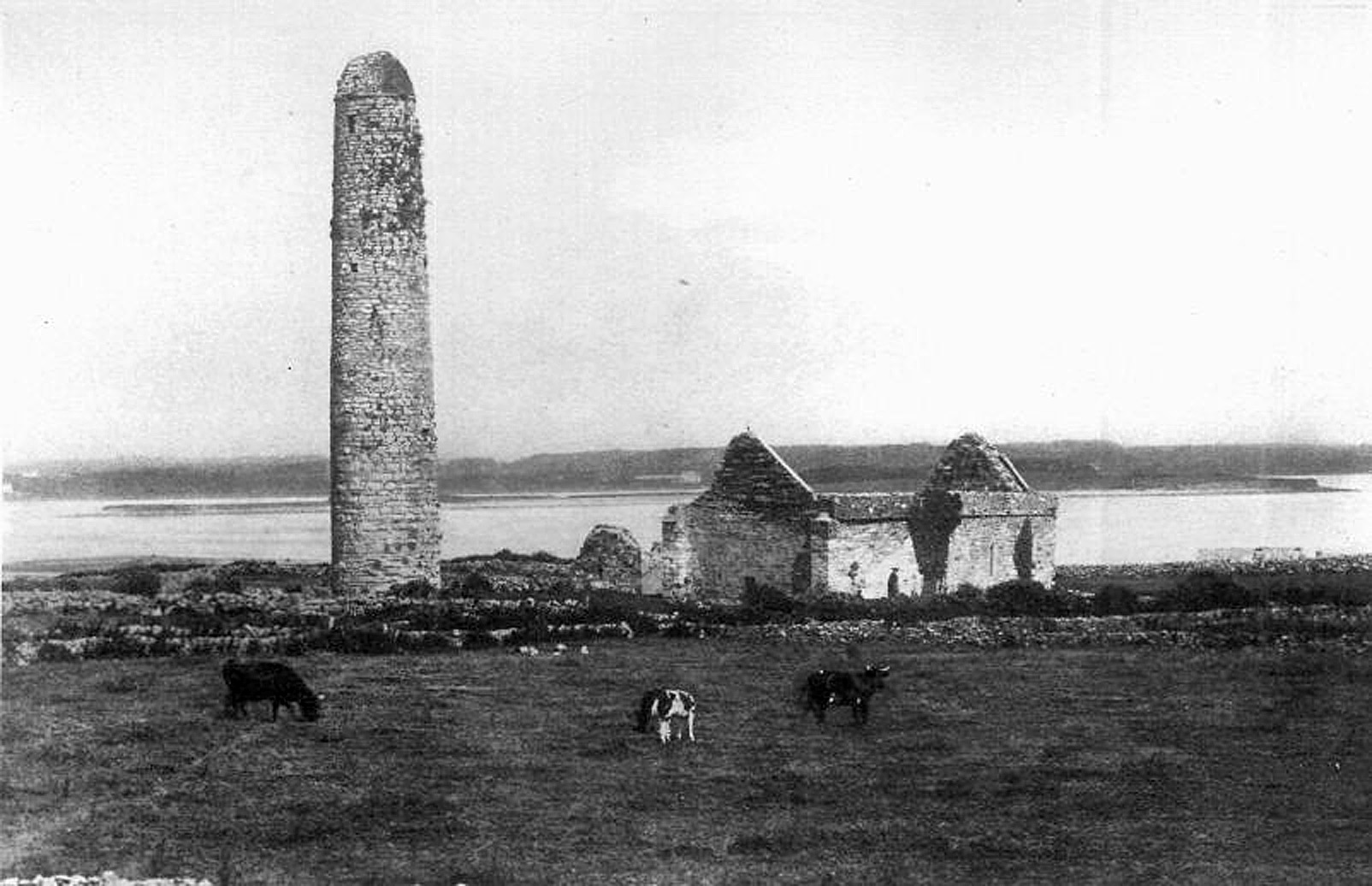
The ruins in 1902

After the Synod of Ráth Breasail in 1111 a canonical diocese of Inis Cathaig (the spelling then current) was established. This was absorbed by the Diocese of Killaloe in 1189, but was restored by Pope Innocent VI and continued as a separate see under Bishop Thomas (1358–68). In 1378 its possessions were divided, and the island remained a portion of the Diocese of Killaloe, being later merged into the parish of Kilrush. However, there is mention of an Englishman, John Grene, as Bishop of Inis Cathaig in 1467.

Inis Cathaigh is now listed among the titular sees of the Catholic Church.

Titular bishops of Inis Cathaigh:

- Thomas Jerome Welsh (1970–1974)
- William Anthony Hughes (1974–1979)
- John Edward Heaps (1981–2004)
- Frank Joseph Caggiano (2006–2013)

== Artillery battery ==
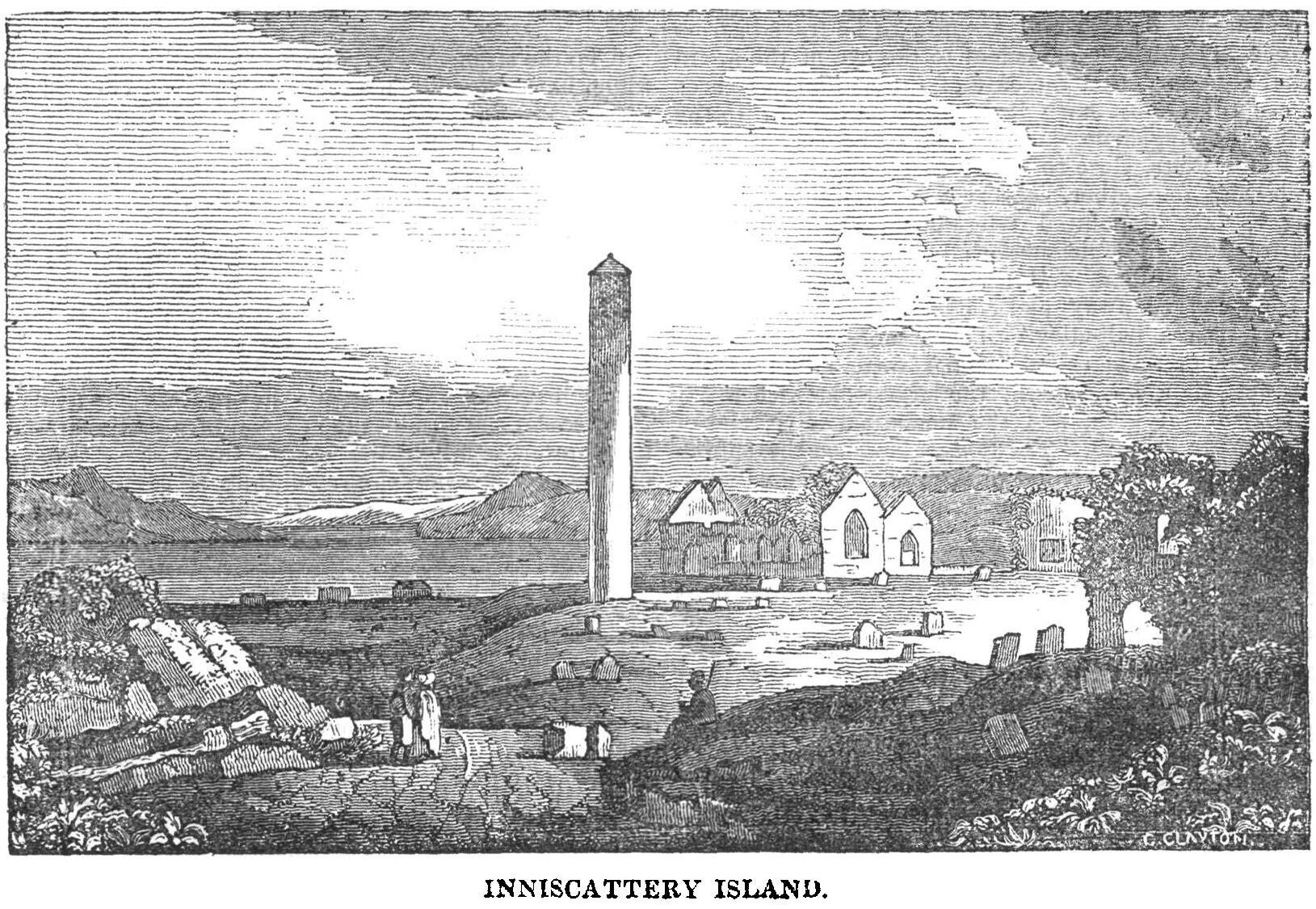
1835, Dublin Penny Journal

Scattery artillery battery, located on the south of Inis Cathaigh, was built during the Napoleonic Wars and is preserved quite well. The Shannon Estuary was one of three invasion places the French had considered along the west of Ireland. As such, places along the estuary were considered for establishing a defence. Inis Cathaigh is one of six batteries in the estuary. It was chosen on the proposal of defected French general Charles-François du Périer Dumouriez. The battery forms a semi-circular D shape with a dry moat. Its main armament consisted of six 24-pounder long guns arranged along the length of the curved D.

== Former residents ==
In 1842, after the salvaging the Windsor Castle, Inis Cathaigh was home to Shannon Estuary Pilots and their families. The primary families of the island were the Brennan, Melican, Scanlan, McMahon, Costelloe, Hehir, Moran, Crotty, and Griffin. The river pilots were highly skilled mariners, using only native currachs (canvas boats) to reach incoming and outgoing ships.

The inhabitants of Inis Cathaigh appear to have escaped the deaths and emigration associated within Kilrush and most of Ireland during the Great Famine. The total population of the island including the soldiers, actually rose from 65 in 1841 to 99 in 1851 and to 139 in 1861. The number of houses in this period rose from nine in 1841 to 24 in 1861. The memorial inscriptions on the gravestones do not show any deaths of islanders during the period 1845 to 1850. It is thought that a combination of fishing, additional shipping due to famine exports to England, along with piloting provided good employment for the pilots and their families.

The last residents left in 1969.

Historical population

Year	Pop.	±%
1841	65	—
1851	99	+52.3%
1861	139	+40.4%
1871	140	+0.7%
1881	141	+0.7%
1891	123	−12.8%
1901	96	−22.0%
1911	99	+3.1%

Year	Pop.	±%
1926	100	+1.0%
1936	84	−16.0%
1946	61	−27.4%
1951	56	−8.2%
1956	42	−25.0%
1961	16	−61.9%
1966	3	−81.2%
1971	2	−33.3%

Year	Pop.	±%
1979	0	−100.0%
1981	0	0.00%
1986	0	0.00%
1991	0	0.00%
1996	0	0.00%
2002	0	0.00%
2006	0	0.00%

Source: Central Statistics Office. "CNA17: Population by Off Shore Island, Sex and Year". CSO.ie.

== Annalistic references ==
See Annals of Inisfallen (AI)

- AI797.2 Ólchobar, son of Flann, abbot of Inis Cathaig, rested.
- AI863.2 Repose of Aedán, abbot of Inis Cathaig.
- AI901.1 Bissextile. Kl. Repose of Mael Brigte son of Brolach, abbot of Inis Cathaig.
- AI958.3 Repose of Cinaed Ua Con Minn, bishop of Les Mór and Inis Cathaig.
- AI974.2 The son of Aralt made a circuit of Ireland with a great company, and plundered Inis Cathaig, and brought Ímar from it into captivity.
- AI974.4 Repose of Scandlán Ua hEirc, learned bishop and abbot of Inis Cathaig.
- AI992.5 Repose of Cathal son of Ledbán, abbot of Inis Cathaig.
- AI994.2 Repose of Fínnechta Ua Ciarucáin, vice-abbot of Inis Cathaig.
- AI1024.7 Senchán, son of Flaithbertach, on his pilgrimage to Inis Cathaig.
- AI1057.5 Inis Cathaig was plundered by the foreigners of the son of Mael na mBó, and a great slaughter [was inflicted] on them.
- AI1094.13 A great mortality of the men of Ireland, so that it is impossible to enumerate all the people that died. From that pestilence died: [...] Ua Maíl Muine, abbot of Inis Cathaig
- AI1101.2 A great hosting around Ireland by Muirchertach, son of Tairdelbach, and he destroyed Ailech and Cúil Rathain at Tuag Inbir, took the hostages of the Ulaid, and proceeded along Slige Midluachra. It was then a naval force came round ... from(?) the north, and they destroyed Inis Cathaig, taking many valuables from it, and committed many other evil deeds.
- AI1130.2 Mac Raith Ua Conchobuir, son of the king of Ciarraige Luachra, was treacherously slain in the termon of Inis Cathaig.

== Gallery ==
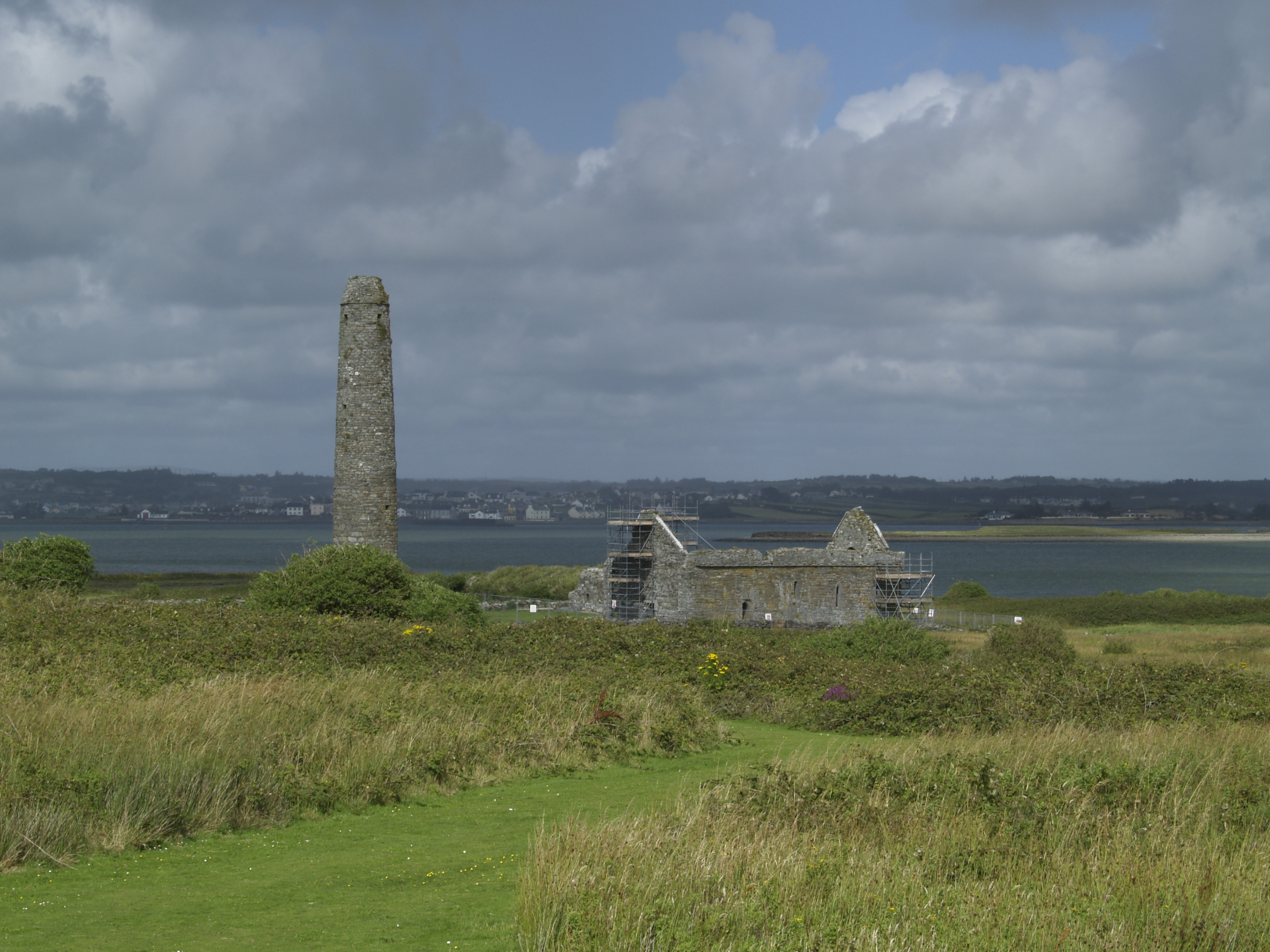
St. Senan's Church (undergoing restorative work(s))

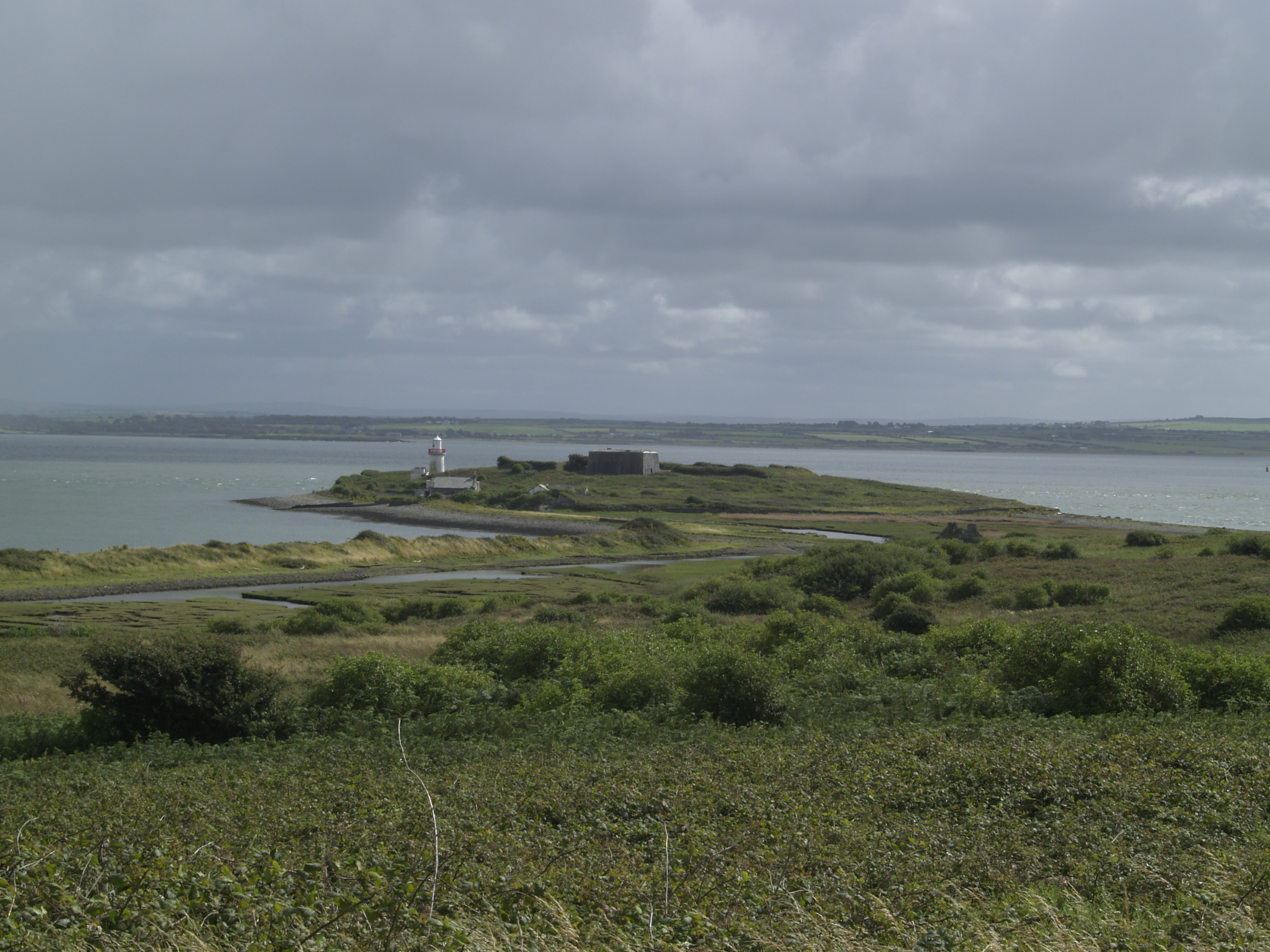
Lighthouse, Cottage and Artillery Battery

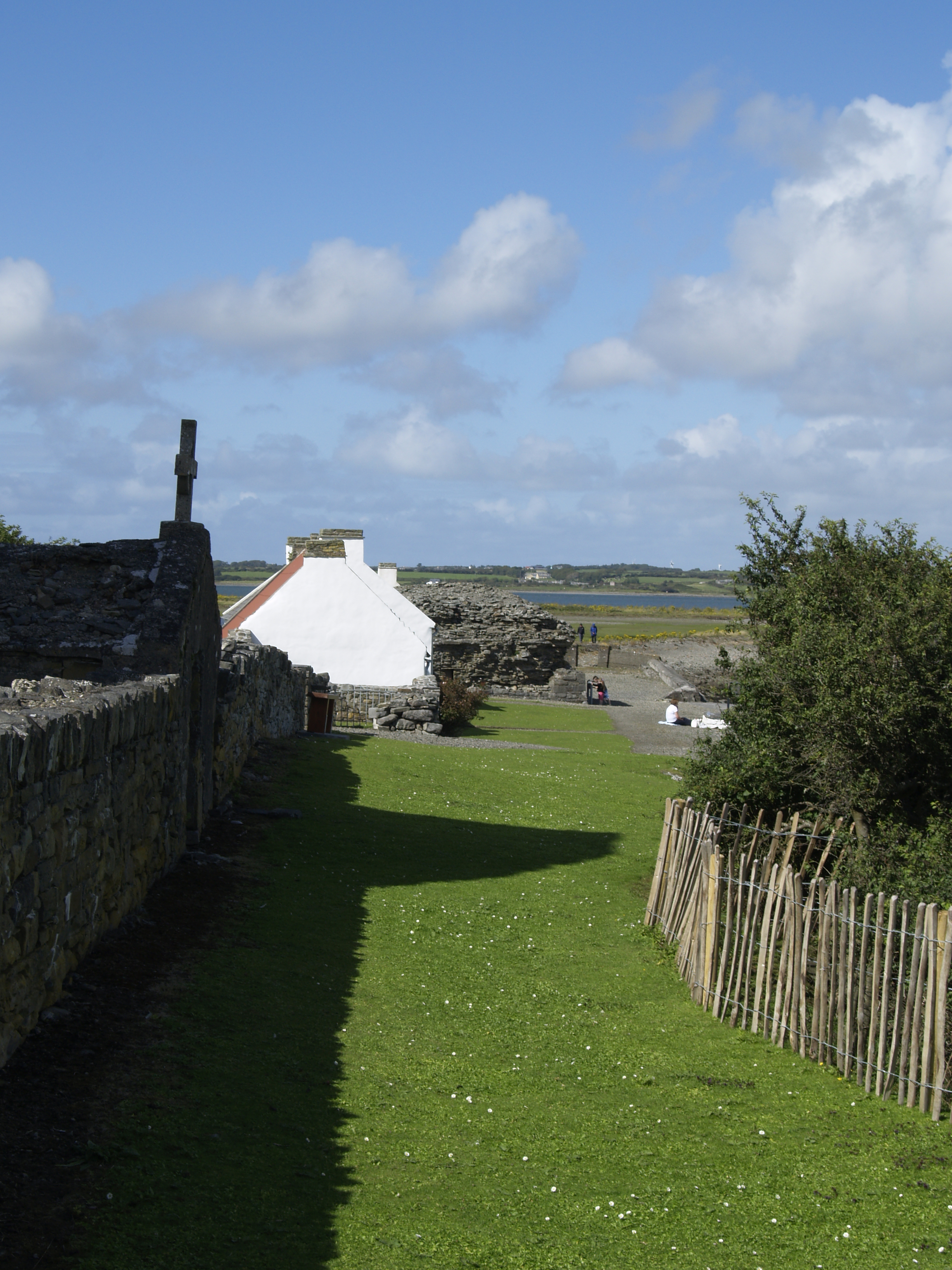
Visitor Center with artifacts and the only restored pilot home

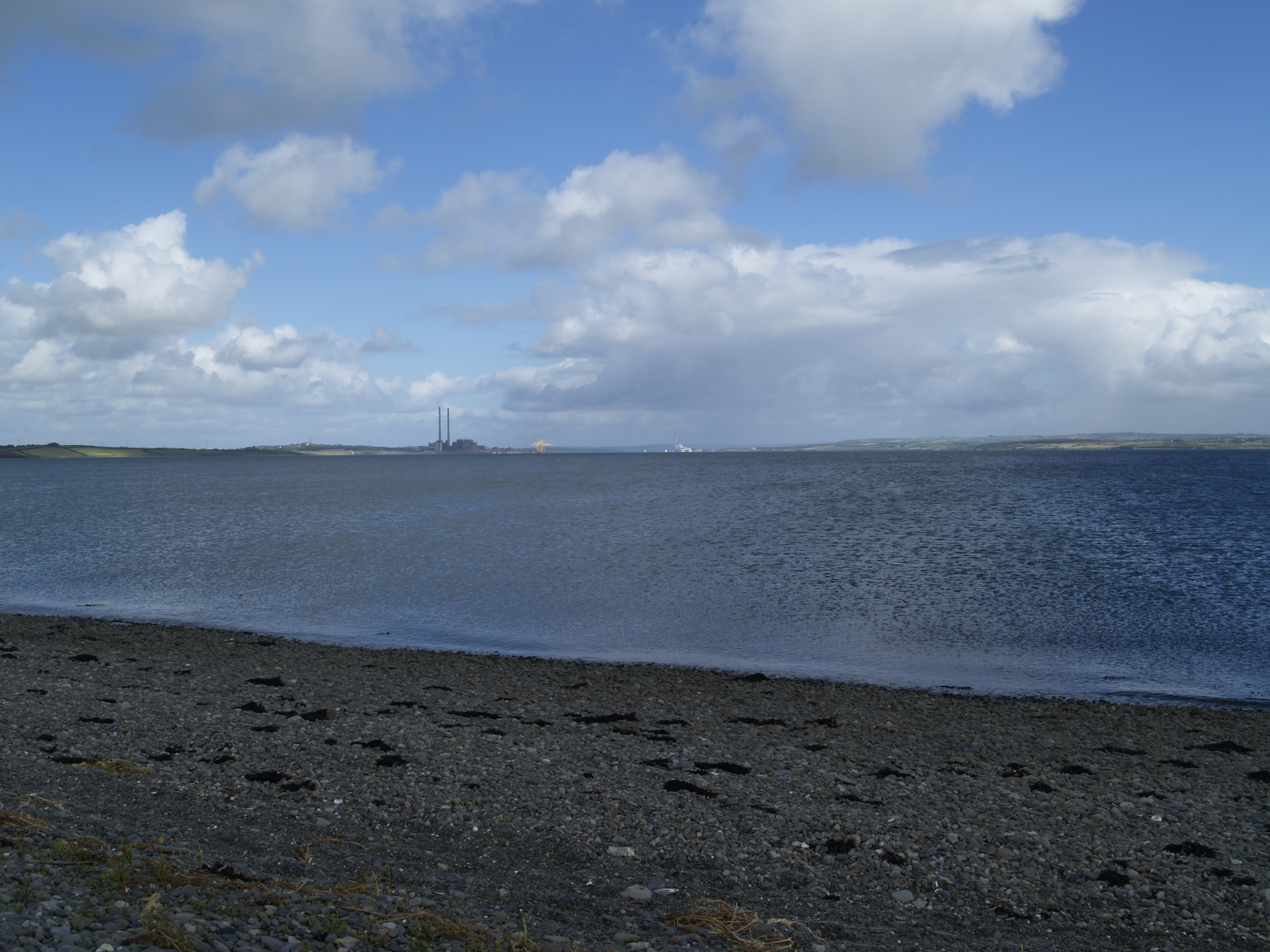
Beach with Moneypoint in background

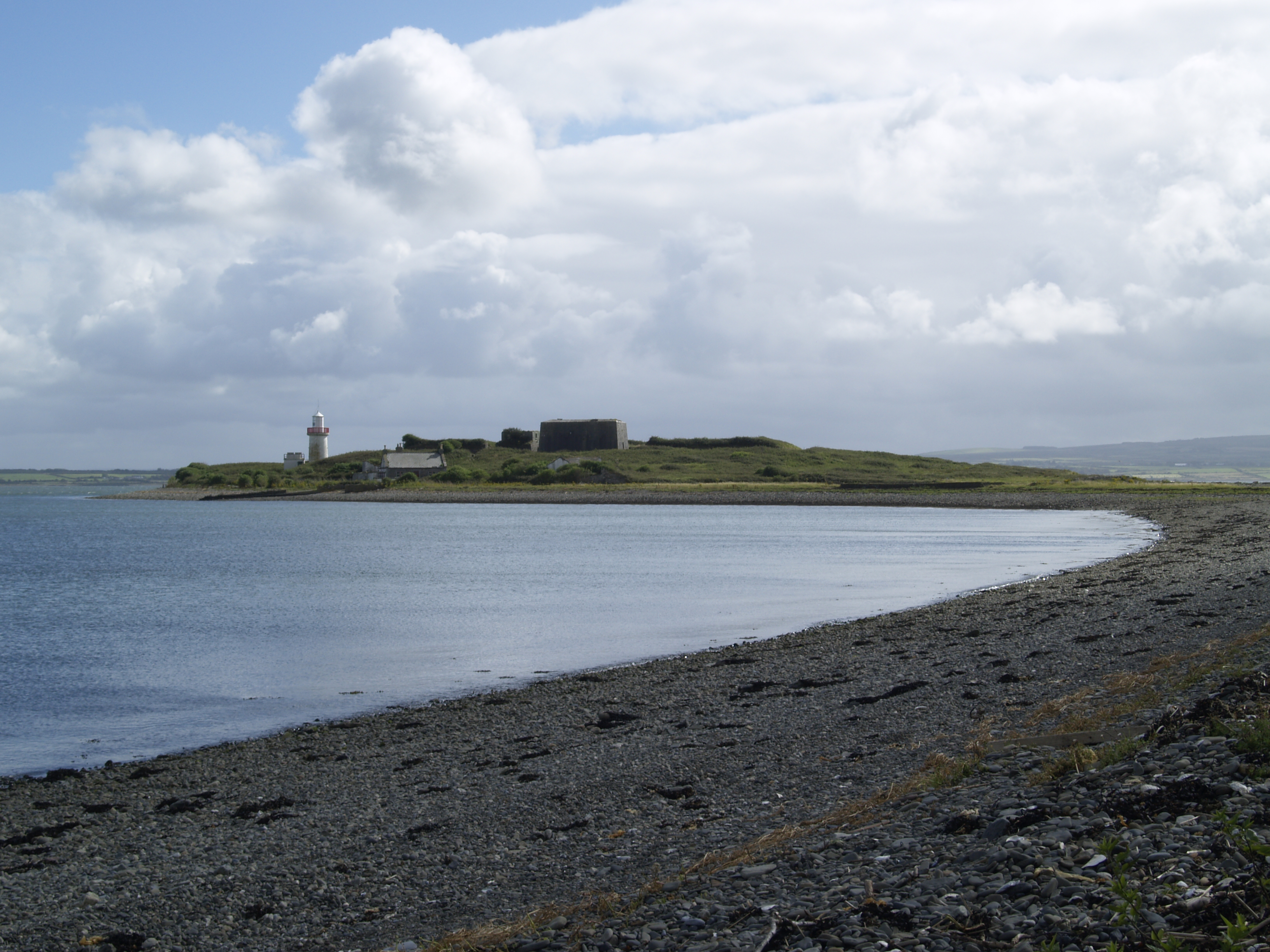
Beach with lighthouse visible

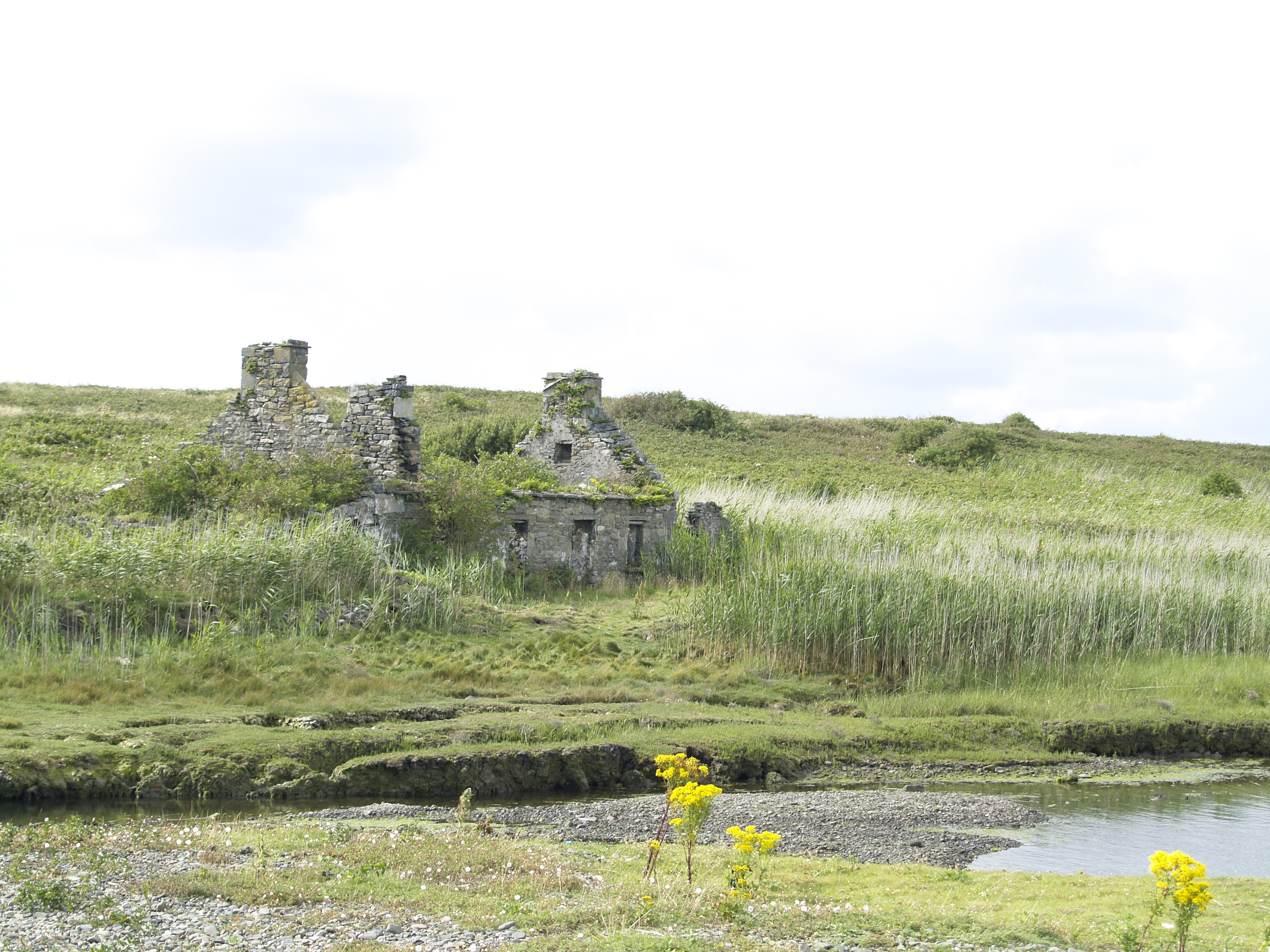
Abandoned Dwelling

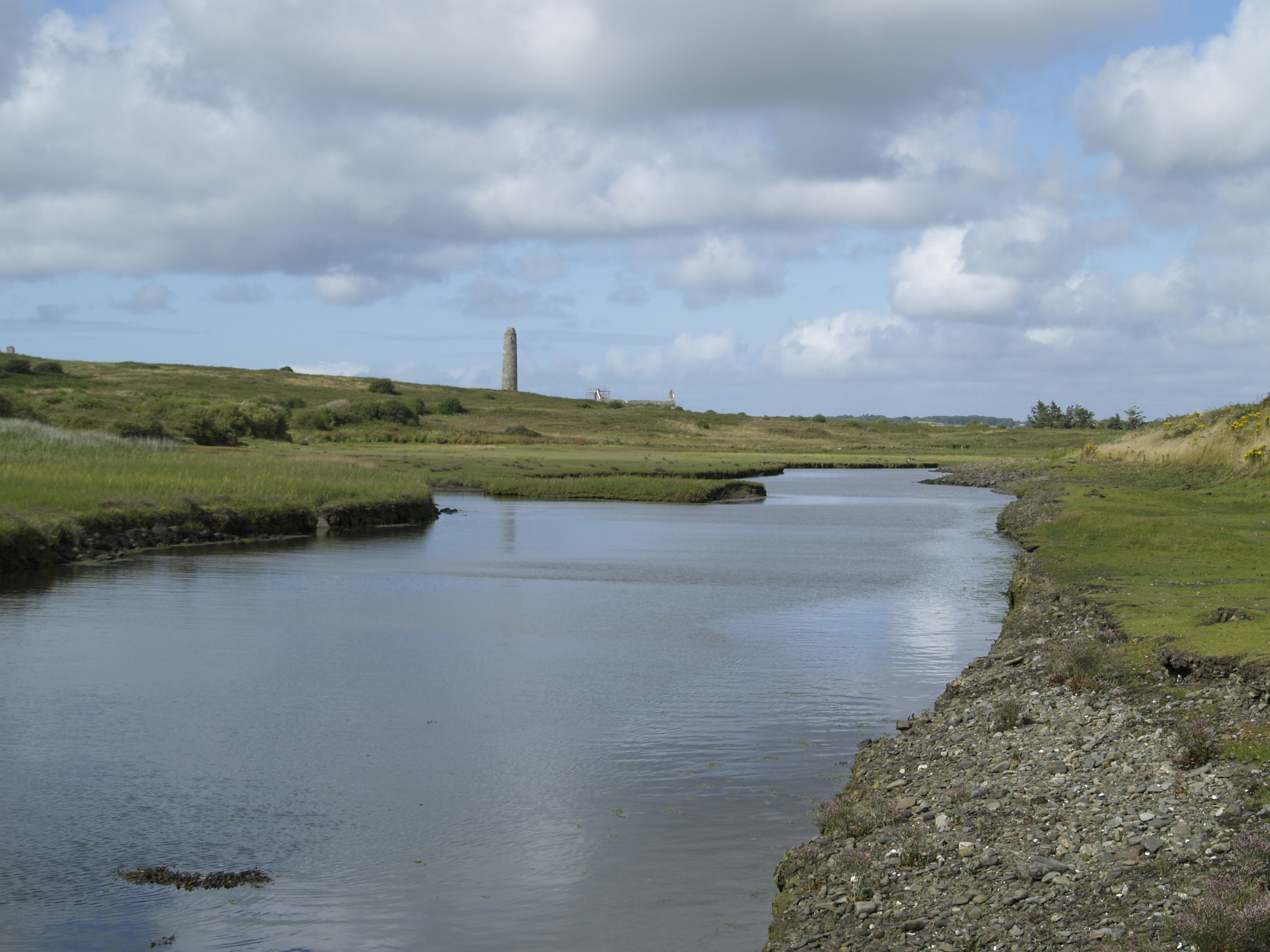
Stream

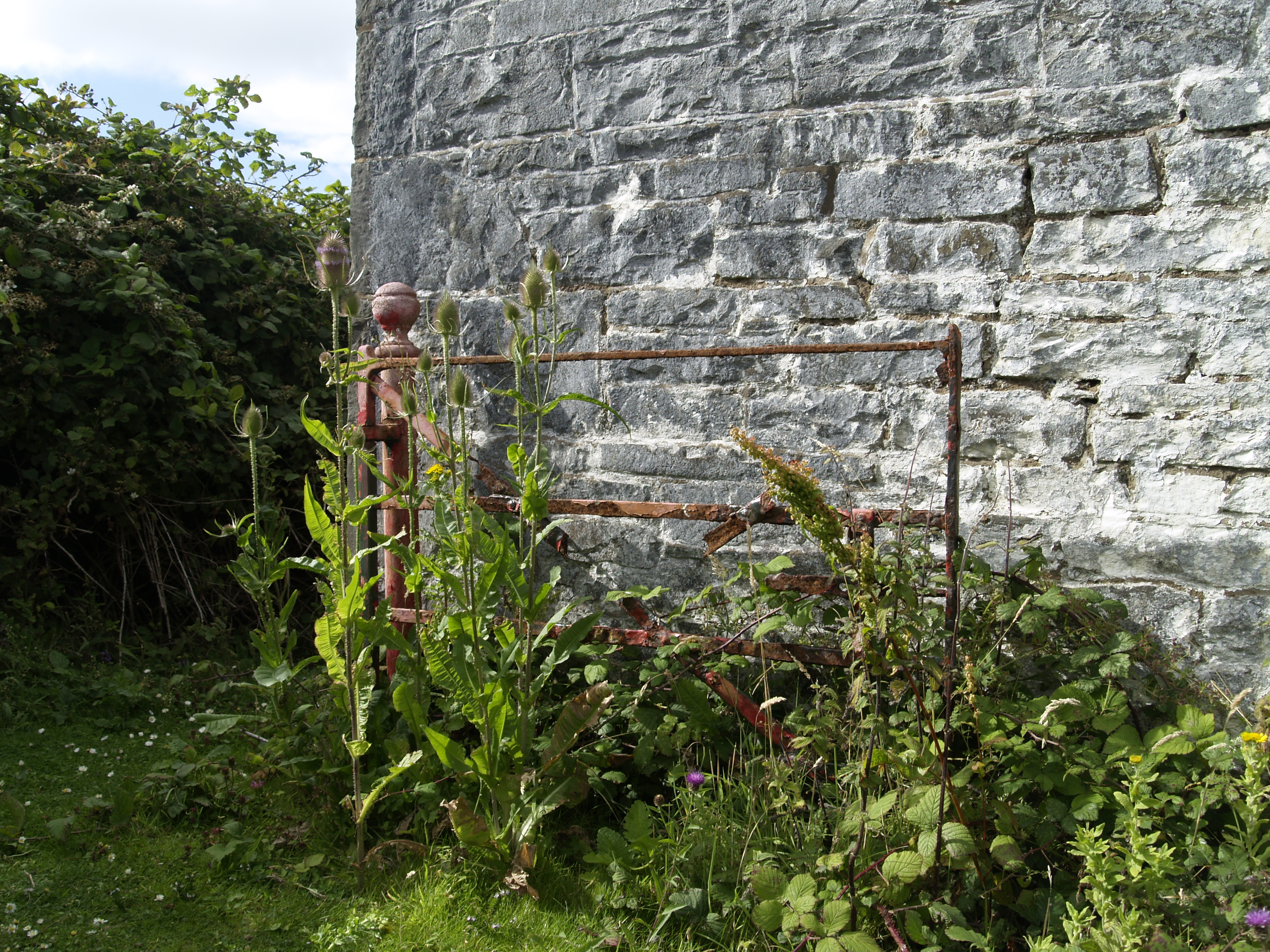
Iron gate

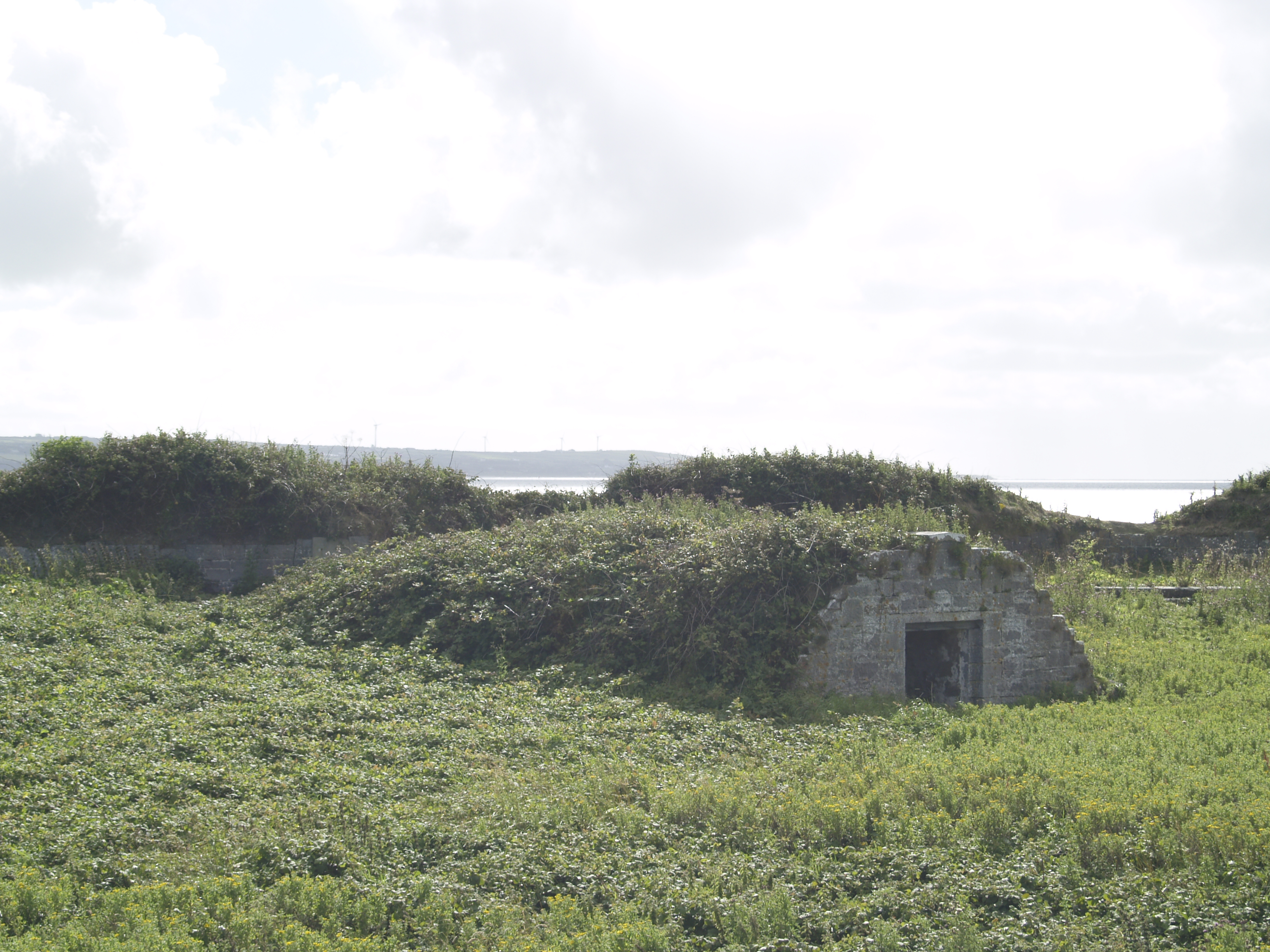
Coastal Defence Battery powder magazine

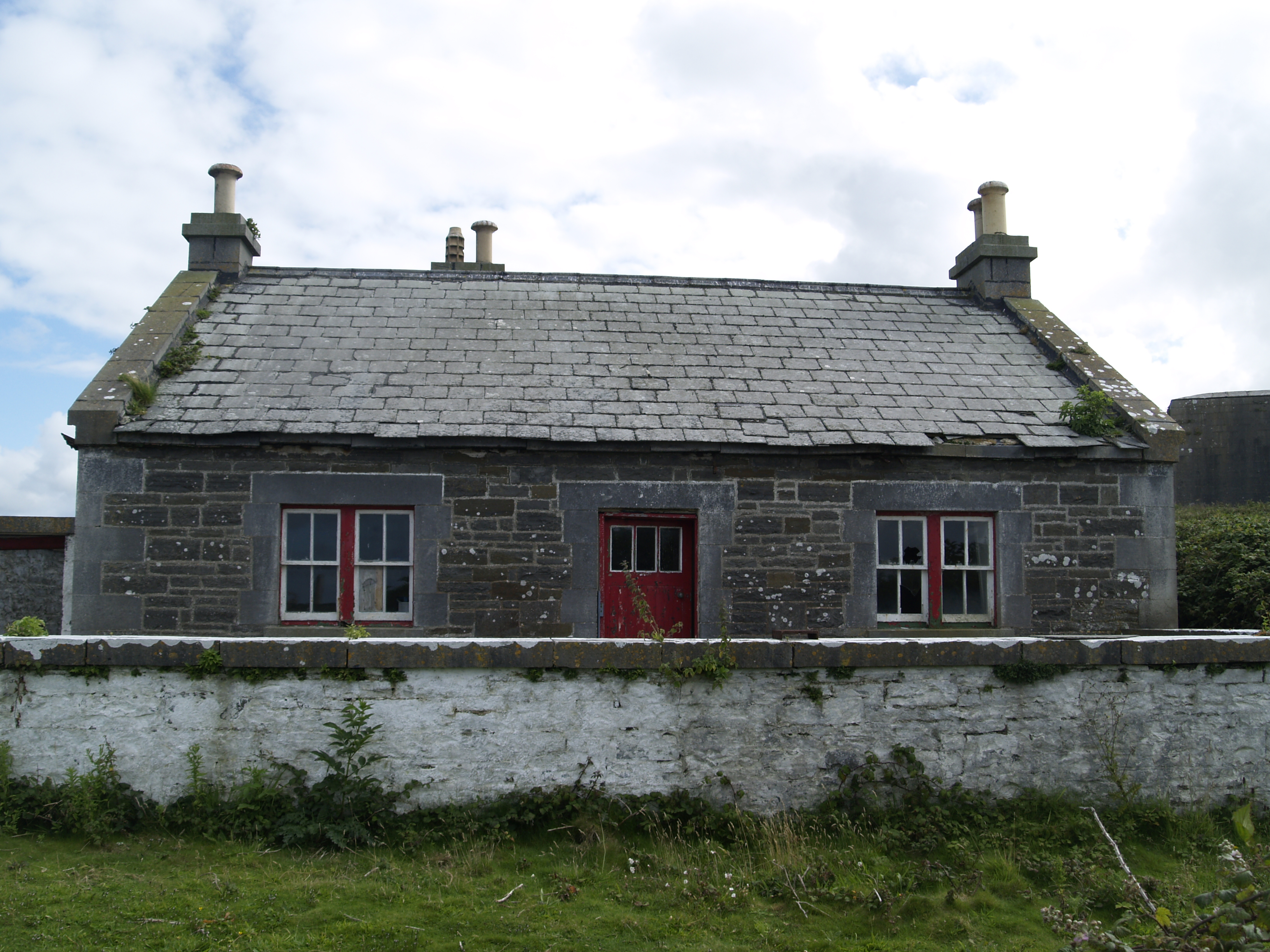
Disused cottage

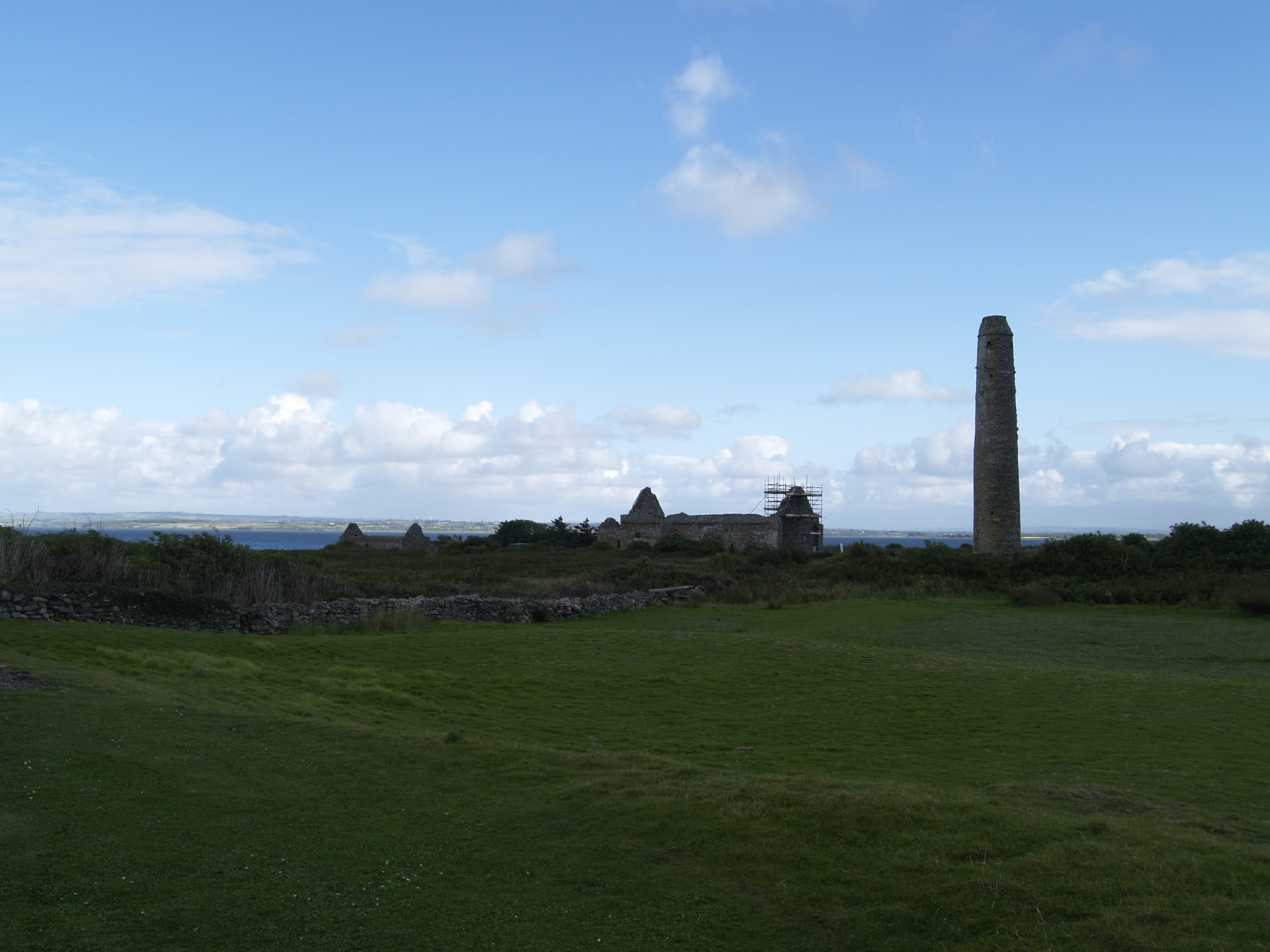
St. Senan's Church with the family graveyard partially visible.

== See also ==
- List of abbeys and priories in Ireland (County Clare)
- Lighthouses in Ireland
