= Conaire (saint) =

Irish holy woman and saint

Saint Conaire or Cainnear
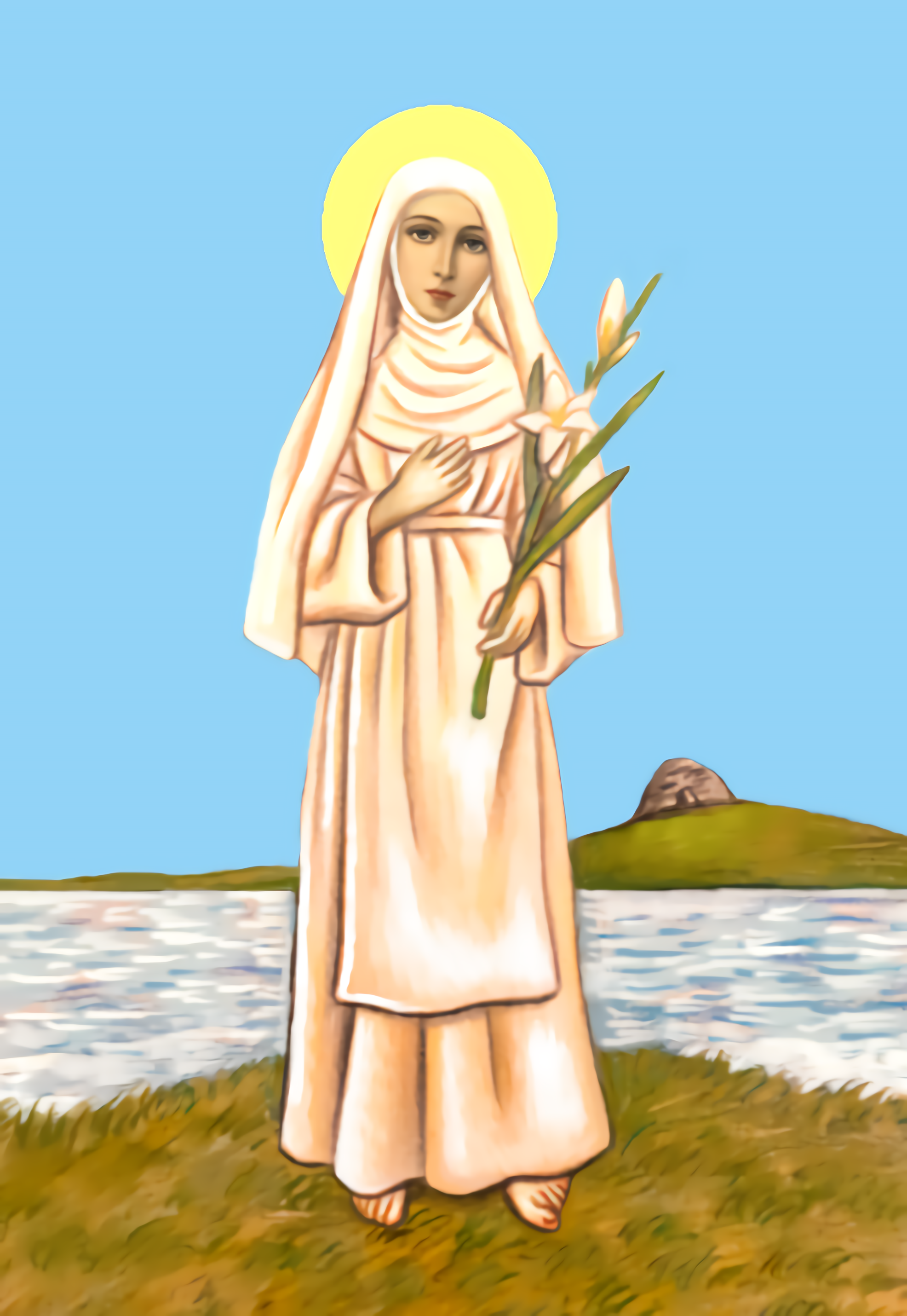
- Saint Cainnear (Cannera or Conaire) of Bantry

Chraibdech 'The Pious'
- Born: 5th or 6th century Bantry Bay, County Cork, Ireland
- Died: 530 AD; Scattery Island, County Clare
- Venerated in: Catholic Church, Eastern Orthodox Church
- Feast: 28 January
- Attributes: An ascetic holding a staff in one hand, a lily or a fish
- Patronage: Against drowning, sailors, water safety, against nyctophobia, against aquaphobia

Saint Conaire (also Cannera, Cainder or Cainnear) (feast day 28 January) was an Irish holy woman who died in 530 AD. Originally from Bantry Bay in modern County Cork, she was an anchorite who lived in a self-imposed solitude and spiritual exile from society.

== Life ==
What little is known about St. Conaire's life comes from the "Life of St. Senan" in which she is mentioned. Reputedly, while nearing the end of her life, she had a vision of all the monasteries in Ireland, and extending from each upwards to the heavens was a pillar of fire. The fire-pillar from Saint Senán mac Geircinn's monastery at Inis Cathaig, in the mouth of the River Shannon, was the highest and so Conaire set off in its direction, judging it to be the most holy.

When she arrived at the monastery, Senán and his monks refused her admittance - as their chastity vows prohibited contact with women. According to some sources, Conaire argued that "Christ came to redeem women no less than to redeem men. No less did he suffer for the sake of women than for the sake of men. No less than men, women enter into the heavenly kingdom. Why, then, should you not allow women to live in this place?".

Senán is reputed to have partially relented and, although not allowed beyond the shore of the island, Conaire was given communion before dying and was buried on the coast of the island. Her grave is marked by a simple flag. St. Conaire was listed in the ancient Irish martyrologies of Tallaght, of Donegal and of O'Gorman under 28 January.

== Name variations ==
St. Conaire is listed in the Martyrology of Donegal as Cainder. There are several variations of her name including Cannera, Canaire, Canair, Cainnear, Cainner, Cainir, Cainer and Connera. A likely reason for this is because of a medieval scribe's spelling error at one point, mistaking 'a' for 'o' which was not uncommon. Another reason is because of the lack of standardisation in the pronunciation of the Irish language, resulting in the frequent and regional mispronunciation and misspelling of the saint's name over the centuries.

== O'Mulconry clan ==
St. Conaire is the namesake of the ancient Irish bardic family Ó Maolconaire of Roscommon (descendant of the servant of Saint Conaire) who were priomhseanachie (antiquaries) to the kings in Gaelic Ireland, and ran schools of traditional poetry, history, and law throughout Ireland.

== Legacy and traditions ==
Catholic churches dedicated to Saint Conaire include St. Conaires in Carrigerry, County Clare in Ireland, and St. Canera's Church in Neosho, Missouri. A national school in Shannon, County Clare is also dedicated to her and its pupils undertake an annual pilgrimage on her feast day 28 January.

Some people believed that anyone who visited St. Conaire's church would not be drowned at sea. Similarly, pebbles from her grave site on Scattery Island were taken by sailors and placed in their boats to protect them from shipwreck.

== In popular culture ==
Thomas Moore, the Irish poet, wrote a poem entitled St. Senanus and the Lady in which he described the encounter between St. Conaire and St. Senan at Scattery Island. A modern song, titled 'Oró Canaire', was included in the Alive-O series for primary school religious education.
