= Senán mac Geirrcinn =

Early Irish monastic saint (488–544)

Saint Senan of Inis Cathaigh
- Born: 488; Moylougha, Kingdom of Munster, Gaelic Ireland (today Kilrush, County Clare, Ireland)
- Died: 544; Inis Cathaigh, Kingdom of Munster, Gaelic Ireland
- Venerated in: Roman Catholic Church, Eastern Orthodox Church
- Feast: 8 March

Senán mac Geircinn (fl. 6th century) was an Irish Christian minister. He was a resident of Munster and is important in Irish tradition, as founder of Inis Cathaigh (Scattery Island, Iniscathy) and patron of the Corco Baiscinn and the Uí Fhidgeinte. He is listed among the Twelve Apostles of Ireland.

== Life ==
He was born in 488 in a place once known as Moylougha, about four miles east of present-day Kilrush, County Clare, Ireland. According to the prose life, his mother entered labour while walking through the woods; when she grasped a tree branch for support, it is said to have blossomed to foretell the virtues of the saint. The translation of "Senan" from old Gaelic means "little old wise man." It is thought that Senan may have got his name from an earlier river god whose name gave rise to the river Shannon. He was a stepbrother of St. Cainnear and St Conainne.

While still only a child, Senan began to practice and preach self-denial, once even reproving his mother for gathering blackberries. God, he reminded her, made time for abstinence as well as for eating. The boy promised his life to God after the miracle at the estuary, where a path opened for him and the cattle he was driving at high tide.

He studied under a monk, named Cassidus from whom he received the habit and tonsure of a monk. From him, he learned sacred scriptures and the practices of the religious life. Cassidus sent him on to St Natalis at Kilnamanagh, whereupon completion of his studies he was ordained a priest. He commenced his missionary career by founding a church near Enniscorthy, in 510 (or 512), and the parish is still known as Templeshannon (Teampul Senain).

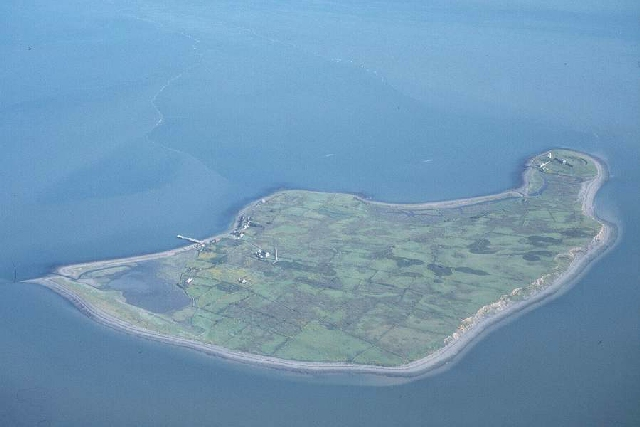
Scattery Island from the air

Senan was well-read and an exceptional traveller in such times, travelling to Britain (see the village of Senan in Cornwall), France (Plouzane in Brittany being translated as the town or church of Senan) and Rome. He returned to Ireland about 520. Studying in many monasteries in Ireland, including Glendalough and Kerry, he founded the abbey on Inishmore (or Deer) Island, leaving St Liberius to preside over it. About 534, he founded a monastery of five churches and a round tower on Inis Cathaigh or Scattery island in the bay on the estuary of the river Shannon just 3 km out from Kilrush. The rule of the monastery was extremely austere. Ciarán and Brendan, and other holy men, who had heard of his sanctity and miracles, visited him for spiritual guidance. Scattery Island became not only a famous abbey but the seat of a bishopric with Senan as its first bishop.

Only men were allowed on Scattery Island while Senan was there, and legend has it that when his sister, St Conainne died, she willed it that she would be buried near Senan. To stay true to his own edicts, Senan waited until low tide to bury her in the inter-tidal zone, which was not officially the "island", thus fulfilling his sister's wish, while not breaking his own rules. This legend seems to have been wrongly associated with Conainne as it is identical to that of the more famous St. Cainnear or Cannera of Bantry who was mentioned in the Latin life of St. Senan. It is very unlikely, though not impossible, that Conainne and Cainnear were actually the same person. A similar story has been associated with another obscure female saint named Ibie or Imy of Killimer. Perhaps these three female saints were all refused access to Scattery Island at some point by St. Senan but it is more probable that Cainnear's story has been misappropriated.

Senan is said to have died on 8 March 544. He is buried on Scattery Island, probably in Temple Senan.

The Chief Ollam of Ireland Dallán Forgaill was his friend and wrote a eulogy about Senan entitled "Amra Senáin"

== Senan and the "Cathach" ==
Legend has it that he slew a huge sea creature that inhabited the island and terrorised the locals. From his childhood he surely would have heard about the ‘Cathach’, the beast that roamed and occupied the island, so fearful and so dangerous that neither man nor beast dared to come near the place. Since it had been revealed to the man of God that this was the place where he should work and pray, he went there, trusting in the power and protection of the Almighty. On his arrival on the island, an archangel led Senan to the highest hill from which he was able to locate the Cathach. Facing the ferocious animal, the saint made the sign of the cross and commanded him to depart.

A local chief hired a druid to put a spell on Senan, but when the druid landed on a nearby island, a tidal wave enveloped him and swept him to his death. That smaller island is still pointed out as Carraig an Draoi or The Druid’s Rock, which can still be seen at low tide.

He is sometimes confused with Saint Senan of Laraghbrine

== Legacy ==
Parishes are named for him in Enniscorthy, Kilrush, Shanagolden and in Shannon. St Senan’s Church is located in Inniscarra.

St. Senan's Primary School is located on Vinegar Hill, Enniscorthy. St. Senan's National School is located in Shannon.

His patron day on 8 March was an important day of pilgrimage to Inis Cathaig.

The surname 'Gilsenan' in present-day is thought to have been the name for the followers of Saint Senan.

== Bibliography ==
- Óengus of Tallaght (1905). Stokes, Whitley (ed.). The Martyrology of Oengus the Culdee. Henry Bradshaw Society. Vol. 29. London.
- Johnston, Elva. "Munster, saints of (act. c.450–c.700)." Oxford Dictionary of National Biography. Oxford University Press, Sept 2004, online edition May 2008. Accessed: 14 Dec 2008.
- Hedderman, Fr. Senan. "Life of St Senan, Bishop, Patron Saint of West Clare". Clare Library. City: Ennis, Co. Clare, Ireland.
