= Earl of Glandore =

Earl of Glandore, in the County of Kerry, was a title in the Peerage of Ireland. It was created in 1776 for the Irish politician William Crosbie, 2nd Baron Brandon.

He was the son of Sir Maurice Crosbie, who had previously represented County Kerry in the Irish House of Commons for over forty years, and was raised to the peerage as Baron Brandon in 1758. The first Baron was succeeded by his son, the second Baron. He was a member of the Irish Parliament for Ardfert. In 1771 he was created Viscount Crosbie, of Ardfert in the County of Kerry, and in 1776 he was further honoured when he was made Earl of Glandore, in the County of Cork. Both titles were in the Peerage of Ireland. On his death, the titles passed to his son, the second Earl. He sat in the House of Lords as one of the original twenty-eight Irish representative peers. He was childless and on his death in 1815 the viscountcy and earldom became extinct.

He was succeeded in the barony by his cousin, the fourth Baron. He was the son of the Very Reverend the Hon. Maurice Crosbie, Dean of Limerick, younger son of the first Baron. Lord Brandon was a clergyman and served as Rector of Castleisland in County Kerry. His marriage to Elizabeth La Touche, daughter of Colonel David La Touche and Lady Cecilia Leeson, was notoriously unhappy, and in 1829 he brought a celebrated action for criminal conversation against William Lamb, 2nd Viscount Melbourne, then Chief Secretary for Ireland, accusing him of adultery with Lady Brandon. The action failed for lack of evidence, but public opinion was largely on the husband's side. Melbourne never admitted to the affair, but he did not, as he did in similar cases like that of Caroline Norton, publicly insist on the lady's innocence, although they remained friends. The fourth Baron and his wife had one daughter Elizabeth Cecilia, who married Henry Galgacus Redhead Yorke, but they had no surviving male issue, and on his death in 1832 the barony became extinct as well.

The family seat was Ardfert Abbey, Ardfert, County Kerry.

== Barons Brandon (1758) ==
- Maurice Crosbie, 1st Baron Brandon (1690–1762)
- William Crosbie, 2nd Baron Brandon (1716–1781) (created Viscount Crosbie in 1771 and Earl of Glandore in 1776)

== Earls of Glandore (1776) ==
- William Crosbie, 1st Earl of Glandore (1716–1781)
- John Crosbie, 2nd Earl of Glandore (1753–1815)

== Barons Brandon (1758; Reverted) ==
- William Crosbie, 4th Baron Brandon (1771–1832)
  - Hon. Maurice Crosbie (died 1816)
