= James Crosbie (Kerry politician) =

Irish politician

James Crosbie (c. 1760 – 20 September 1836) was an Irish politician from County Kerry.

Crosbie was the oldest son of Pierce Crosbie, from Ballyheigue, County Kerry, and his wife Frances, daughter of Rowland Bateman of Oak Park, County Carlow. He was educated in England at Harrow School, and in 1785 he married his cousin Elizabeth née Bateman. They had 4 sons and 2 daughters.

He was High Sheriff of County Kerry in 1792. In 1798 he was elected to the House of Commons of Ireland for both the borough of Tralee and for County Kerry, but chose to sit for the county seat. His election had been organised by his cousin John Crosbie, 2nd Earl of Glandore, whose continued support ensured his return to the House of Commons of the United Kingdom. However he ran out of money and fell out with Glandore, and with neither patronage nor money he was unable to contest the 1806 general election.

A legacy and the support of Lord Ventry secured his re-election in 1812, and he held the seat until 1826. On the death of John Crosbie, 2nd Earl of Glandore he was able to obtain the coveted post of Custos Rotulorum of Kerry, which he held until his own death in 1836.

Parliament of Ireland
Preceded by John Gustavus Crosbie; Maurice FitzGerald	Member of Parliament for County Kerry; 1798–1800; With: Maurice FitzGerald	Succeeded by Parliament of the United Kingdom
Parliament of the United Kingdom
Preceded by Parliament of Ireland	Member of Parliament for County Kerry; 1801–1806; With: Maurice FitzGerald	Succeeded by Maurice FitzGerald; Henry Arthur Herbert
Preceded by Maurice FitzGerald; Henry Arthur Herbert	Member of Parliament for County Kerry; 1812–1826; With: Maurice FitzGerald	Succeeded by Maurice FitzGerald; William Hare
