= Custos Rotulorum of Kerry =

Highest civil officer in the county

Custos rotulorum (plural: custodes rotulorum; Latin for "keeper of the rolls") is the keeper of a county's records and, by virtue of that office, the highest civil officer in the county.

This is a list of people who have served as Custos Rotulorum of County Kerry.

- 1746–1747: The 2nd Earl of Kerry
- 1770–?1781: The 1st Earl of Glandore
- 1785–1815: The 2nd Earl of Glandore
- 1815–1836: James Crosbie

For post-1831 custodes rotulorum, see Lord Lieutenant of Kerry
