= McGillicuddy =

- Pronunciation: /məˈɡɪlɪkədi/ mə-GHIL-ik-ə-dee
- Gender: Masculine
- Language: English

Origin
- Language: Irish language
- Derivation: Mac Giolla Chuda [mˠək ˌɟɪl̪ˠə ˈxʊd̪ˠə]
- Meaning: "son of the servant of St. Mochuda"

Other names
- Variant forms: MacGillacuddy, MacGillecuddy, MacGillycuddy, McGillycuddy, MacIllicuddy, MacElcuddy, MacElhuddy, Mac Giolla Coda.

McGillicuddy (Irish: Mac Giolla Chuda or Mac Giolla Mhochuda) is a surname of Irish origin, meaning "son of the servant of St. Mochuda". A variant form of the name is Mac Giolla Mhochuda. Other Anglicised forms of Mac Giolla Chuda include MacGillacuddy, MacGillecuddy, MacGillycuddy, MacIllicuddy, MacElcuddy, MacElhuddy and Mac Giolla Coda.

The female unmarried variation of the name in Irish is Nic Giolla Chuda, and the married female version of the name is Mhic Ghiolla Chuda.

The MacGillycuddy clan were a sept of the O'Sullivans. The family did not adopt this surname until the sixteenth century.

== People with the surname ==
Notable people with the surname include:

- Cornelius MacGillicuddy (d. 1712), Irish soldier and politician
- Richard Archdekin (1616–1690), who used the alias McGillicuddy
- Connie Mack (Cornelius McGillicuddy, Sr., 1862–1956), American professional baseball player, manager, and team owner
- Connie Mack III (Cornelius Alexander McGillicuddy III, born 1940), former Republican politician
- Connie Mack IV (Cornelius Harvey McGillicuddy IV, born 1967), U.S. Representative for Florida's 14th congressional district
- Daniel J. McGillicuddy (1859–1936), United States Representative from Maine
- John McGillicuddy (1930–2009), American banking industry executive
- Valentine McGillycuddy (1849–1939), surgeon from Detroit and Indian agent in Nebraska

== Fictional characters with the surname ==
- Dr. Aloysius McGillicuddy, putative inventor of Fireball Cinnamon Whisky and Dr. McGillicuddy's liqueurs
- Lucy McGillicuddy Ricardo, fictional character from the American television series I Love Lucy
- Mrs Elspeth McGillicuddy, main character in the Agatha Christie crime novel 4:50 from Paddington
- Mrs McGillicuddy, citizen of the town of Popperville in the children's book Mike Mulligan and His Steam Shovel by Virginia Lee Burton
- Mez McGillicuddy is the name of a party guest who plays the French horn, played by the composer David Amram, in the 1959 short film Pull My Daisy.
- MacGillicuddy, a recurring character played by Jack Blessing in the third to fifth seasons (1986-1989) of the TV series Moonlighting.

== See also ==
- McGillicuddy Highland Army, the fighting wing of New Zealand's Clan McGillicuddy
- McGillycuddy of the Reeks, one of the hereditary Chiefs of the name of Ireland
- McGillicuddy Serious Party, satirical political party in New Zealand politics
- McGillicutty (disambiguation), a similar surname
