= The Wizard of New Zealand =

New Zealand educator, comedian, magician, and politician (born 1932)

The Wizard of New Zealand QSM
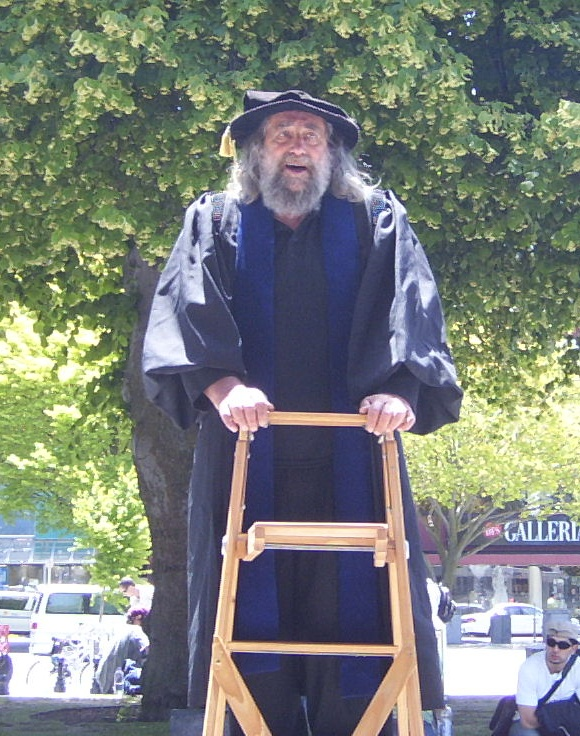
- The Wizard speaking in Cathedral Square in December 2006
- Born: Ian Brackenbury Channell; 4 December 1932 (age 93); London, England
- Education: Framlingham College; Bromley Grammar School for Boys; University of Leeds
- Partner: Alice Flett
- Website: wizard.gen.nz

The Wizard of New Zealand (born Ian Brackenbury Channell; 4 December 1932) is a British-born New Zealand educator, comedian, illusionist, and politician. He is also known by his shorter name, The Wizard.

== Life and career ==
=== England ===
The Wizard was born Ian Brackenbury Channell on 4 December 1932 in London, England. He was educated at Framlingham College, Suffolk, and from 1945 to 1951 at Bromley Grammar School for Boys, now Ravensbourne School. In 1951, he was called up for national service in the Royal Air Force. Although he initially trained to be a pilot, he was later transferred to navigator training in Canada and was subsequently posted as the adjutant at RAF Duxford. He left the RAF in 1953 and became a sales representative for a paper merchant. In 1956, he married his girlfriend, Monica, and from 1958 spent two years teaching English in Iran. He then returned to England in order to attend the University of Leeds and graduated with a double honours degree in psychology and sociology in 1963. While a student at Leeds, he represented the institution on the quiz show University Challenge, playing on a team against the University of Manchester during the show's inaugural episode in 1962.

=== Australia ===
Shortly after his graduation in 1963, he was recruited by the University of Western Australia Adult Education Board to run their community arts programme. In 1967, he became a teaching fellow at the newly opened School of Sociology at the University of New South Wales in Sydney. He was required to study towards a PhD thesis, but was informally promised a lectureship once completed.

During this time he created a direct action reform movement called Alf (Action for Love and Freedom) and implemented what he called "The Fun Revolution". In 1968, he separated from his wife and his thesis was terminated due to insufficient progress. As his position was dependent on the continuation of his studies, he was consequently dismissed as a teaching fellow. The next year he was appointed as "Wizard" (effectively an events officer) of the University of New South Wales. He would also take on another persona, when elected as dictator of the student union. In late 1969, he was made Wizard by the World University Service of Australia and toured university campuses throughout 1970. He was able to persuade the Melbourne University Union Activities Department to appoint him their unpaid "Cosmologer, Living Work of Art and Shaman" in 1971. The vice-chancellor gave him the use of the Old Pathology Lecture Theatre for his classes in synthetic cosmology and the director of the National Gallery of Victoria accepted the offer of his live body as a living work of art. At this time, shocked when the student pacifist society sent money to the Viet Cong, he founded Alf's Imperial Army devoted to sensational but non-violent warfare and regularly organised battles on campus. He founded the Imperial British Conservative Party to provide a counterbalance to international capitalism and the various forms of Nazism. The Wizard produced an upside-down map using the Hobo–Dyer projection which placed New Zealand and Australia top-centre.

The Wizard stood unsuccessfully in three Australian federal elections, contesting Sydney in 1969, and Kooyong in 1972 and 1974.

=== New Zealand ===
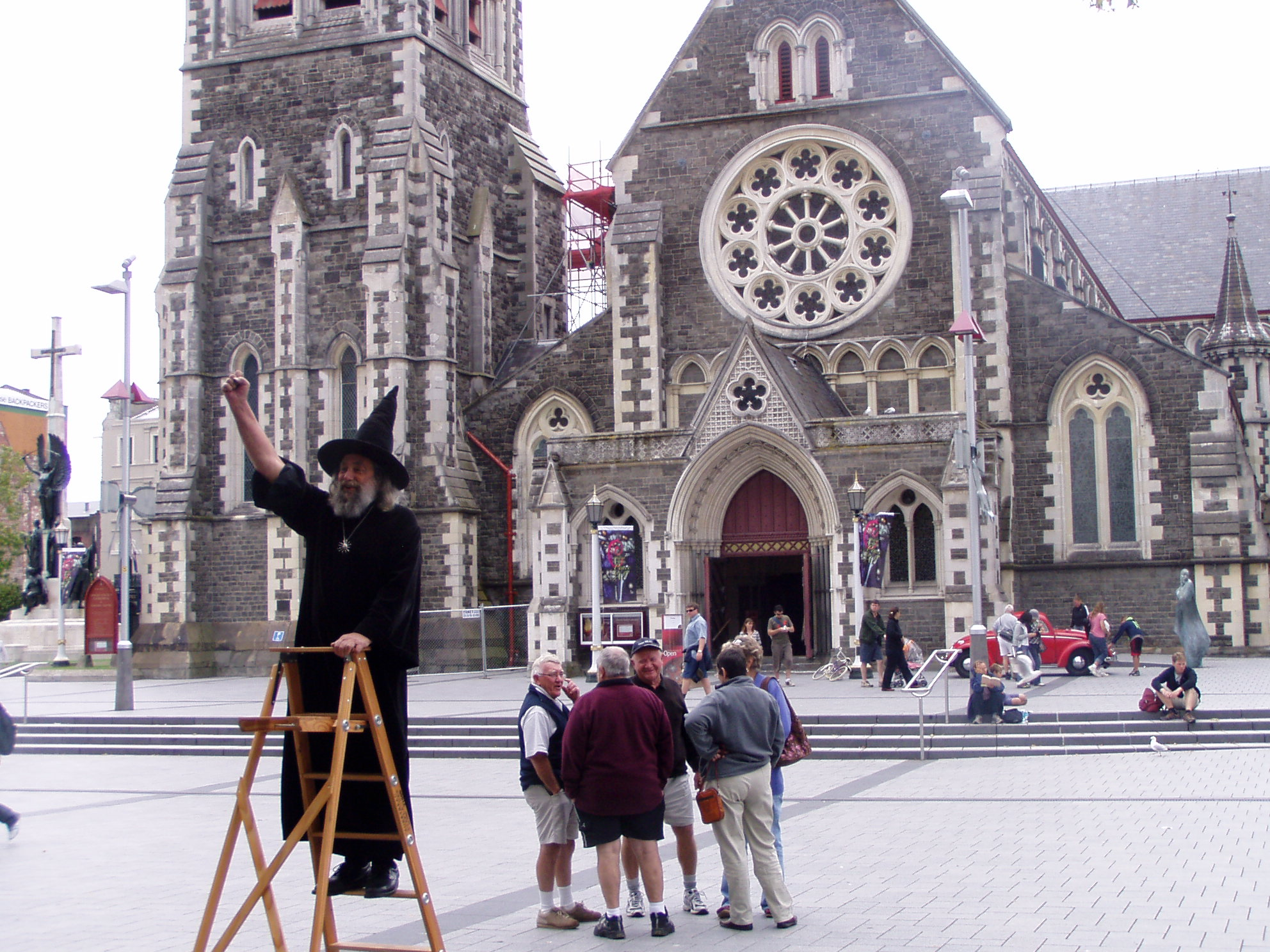
The Wizard in front of Christchurch Cathedral in January 2007

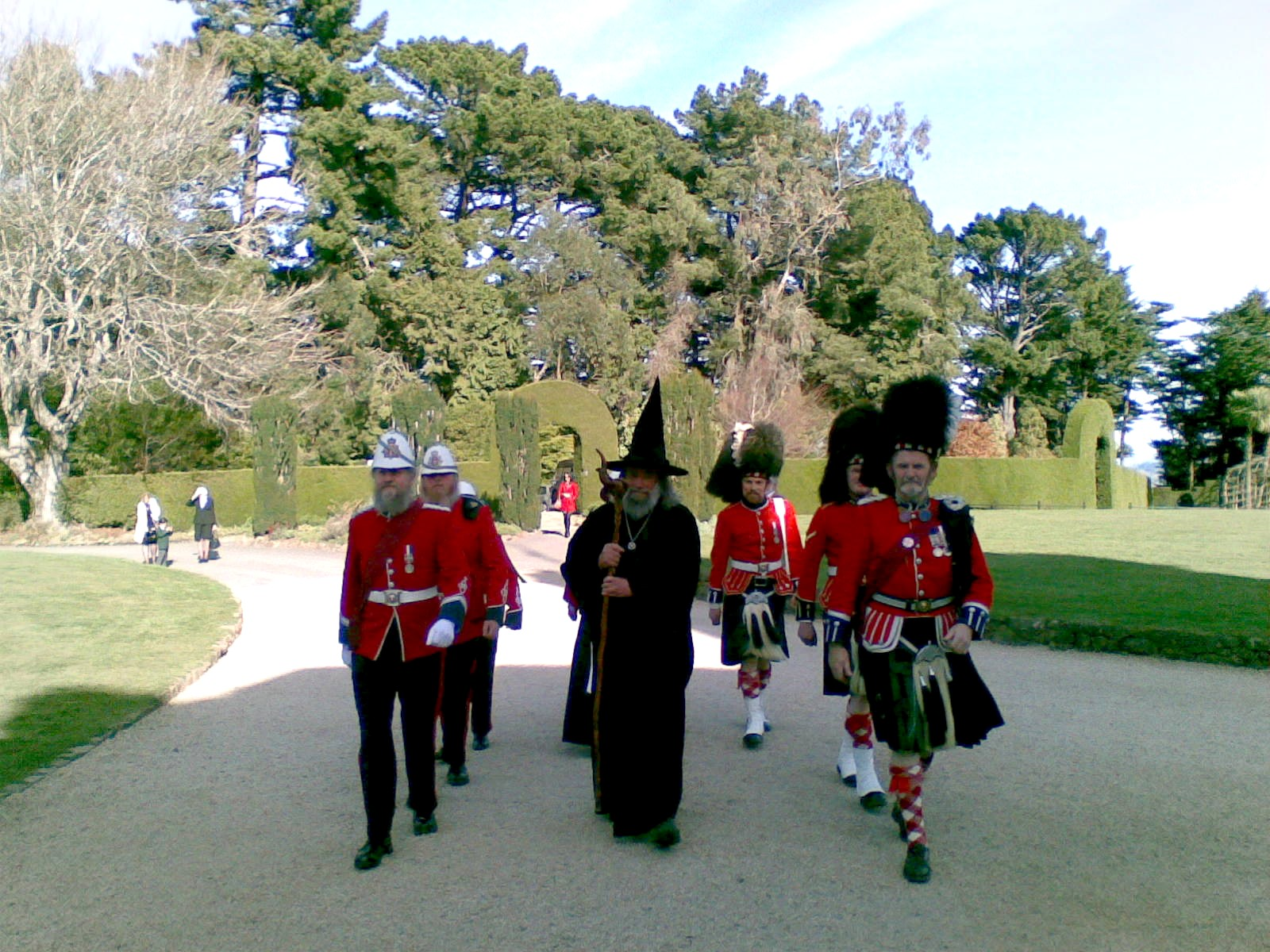
The Wizard of New Zealand escorted by members of Alf's Imperial Army at his investiture with the Queen's Service Medal, 2009

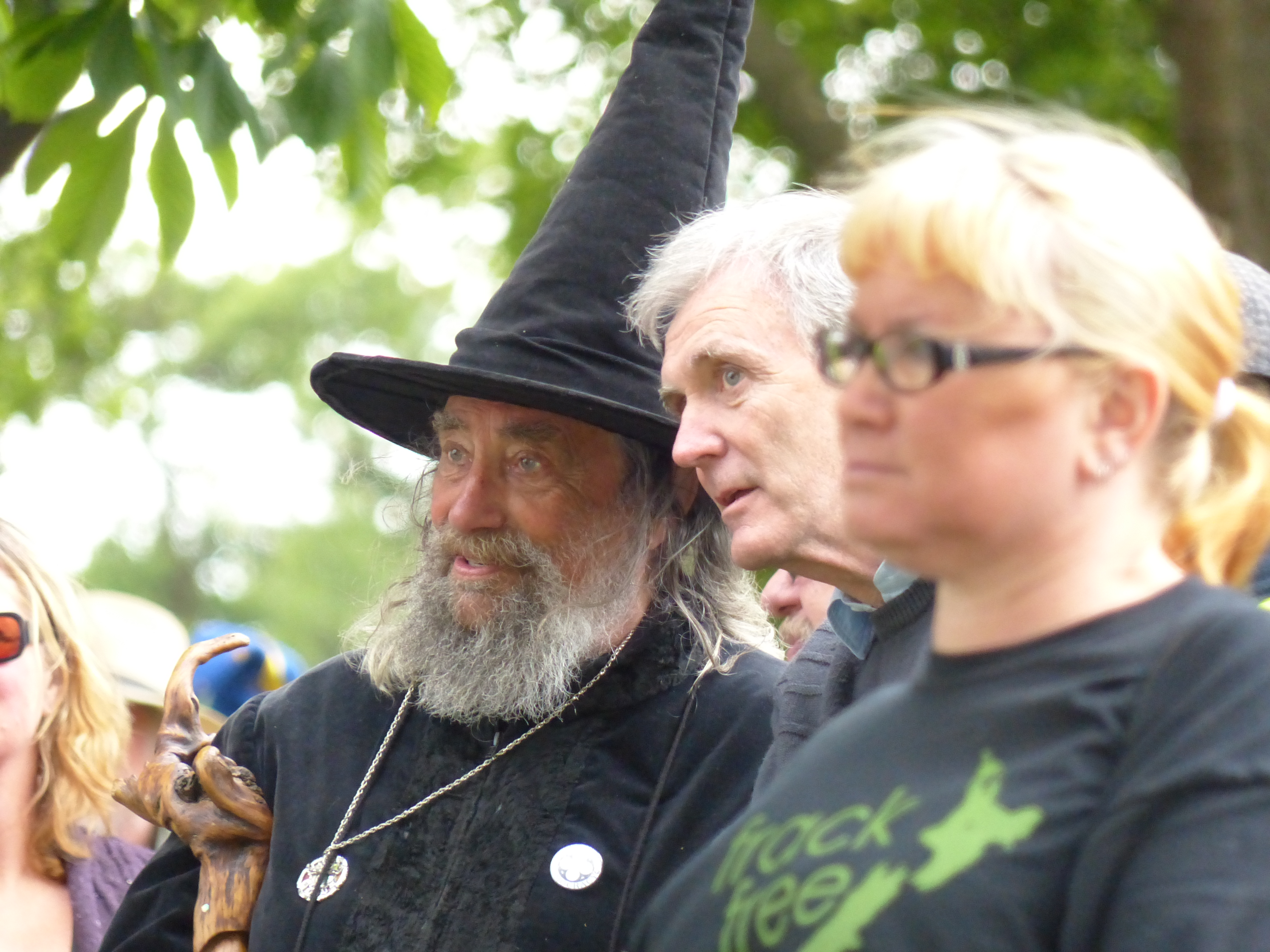
The Wizard in December 2012

In 1974, the Wizard migrated to Christchurch in New Zealand and began to speak on a ladder in Cathedral Square. The city council attempted to have him arrested, but he became so popular that they made the square a public speaking area. Wearing his costume as a false prophet of the Church of England, or his wizard's pointy hat, he has spoken there at lunchtimes in the summer months.

He confronted Telecom over the colour of public telephone boxes, played for the local rugby team, heckled Christian evangelist Ray Comfort, evaded the compulsory New Zealand census and performed rain dances in Canterbury, Auckland and the Australian outback.

In 1982, the New Zealand Art Gallery directors association issued a statement that in their opinion the Wizard was an authentic living work of art and the city council appointed him "Wizard of Christchurch". In 1990, the Prime Minister of New Zealand, Mike Moore, an old friend, appointed him the official "Wizard of New Zealand".

With the help of the mayor, Vicki Buck, the city of Christchurch hosted a wizards' conclave in 1995 when visiting colleagues gathered to help build a wizard's nest on top of the university library tower, to witness the Wizard hatching from a giant egg in the city art gallery, sky diving whilst chanting a spell for a major rugby match and performing various rituals round the city. Soon afterwards, accompanied by 49 assistant wizards, he came down by gondola from the Port Hills with tablets bearing the address of his new website.

He initially provided his services free. In 1998, the Christchurch City Council signed a contract with him to "provide acts of wizardry and other wizard-like-services – as part of promotional work for the city of Christchurch" for an annual fee of $16,000. The Wizard also received financial support from his partner, Alice Flett. In 1998, an autobiography titled My Life as a Miracle was published.

On 8 September 2003, the Wizard's large wooden house was destroyed by a fire, which Christchurch police treated as arson. The "Wizardmobile", constructed from the front halves of two VW Beetles, was also attacked and damaged. The Wizard was awarded the Queen's Service Medal in the 2009 Queen's Birthday Honours for service to the community.

After the February 2011 Christchurch earthquake, the Wizard planned to retire and permanently leave Christchurch, saying that the town he loved had gone and that it was the end of an era. After it was announced by the Canterbury Earthquake Recovery Authority and the Anglican bishop that the remains of Christchurch Cathedral would be demolished, the Wizard returned to Christchurch to oppose the demolition. The Wizard continues to speak on the need to preserve Christchurch's heritage buildings.

Between 2014 and 2021, Ari Freeman was the Wizard's apprentice. He distanced himself from the Wizard due to the latter's "divisive politics" and public comments about women and drag storytime events.

In October 2021, the Christchurch City Council ended its contract with the Wizard after he received criticism over comments about striking women, stating that the city was pursuing a new and modern direction. The Wizard said he was disappointed but would continue to appear in the city. The Wizard stood as a candidate in the 2022 Christchurch mayoral election, receiving 2,474 votes and coming in fifth place.

== Documentaries ==
The Wizard of New Zealand QSM, directed by Grant John Neville and director of photography Karlos Filipov, includes interviews with the Wizard, Mike Moore and many others. Among other topics, the documentary details the Wizard's views that women cause wars through their shopping habits and that governments with monarchies are more stable. It was awarded Best Short Documentary at the Beijing International Film Festival 2010, and Best Film about Real People at the Official Best of Fest 2010.

The Wizard and the Commodore – Chathams Islands/New Zealand, directed by Samuel A. Miller, follows the subject on a trip to the Chatham Islands, about 900 km east of mainland New Zealand. The film premiered on 1 July 2016 in New Zealand.
