= Governor of Cork =

Historic military role in Cork, Ireland

The Governor of Cork was a military officer who commanded the garrison at Cork in Ireland. The office became a sinecure and in 1833 was abolished from the next vacancy.

== List of governors of Cork ==
=== Governors ===
- 1644: Major Muschamp
- 1651: Colonel Robert Phaire (for Parliament) (page 175)
- 1672: Francis Boyle, 1st Viscount Shannon
- 1678: Richard Boyle, 2nd Viscount Shannon
- 1689: Daniel O'Brien, 3rd Viscount Clare and M. Boileau (for King James II)
- 1690: Richard Power, 1st Earl of Tyrone and Roger McElligott (for King James II)
- 1690: Colonel Hales and Colonel Hastings (for King William)
- 1691: Charles Boyle, 2nd Earl of Burlington
- 1691: Sir Richard Cox
- 1692: Sir Toby Purcell
- 1698: Sir James Jeffreys
- 1698–1700: Position abolished
- 1701: Sir James Jeffreys
- 1722: James Jeffreys (son of above)
- 1746–?1750: Gervais Parker
- 1752–1764: Lieut-General Sir James St Clair
- 1764–1768: Lord Robert Bertie
- 1768–1778: Col. John Wynne
- 1778–1782: Nicholas Lysaght
- 1782–1789: Thomas Pigott
- 1789–1792: Mountifort Longfield
- 1792–1811: The Earl of Massereene
- 1811–1820: The Lord Beresford
- 1820–1828: Sir Brent Spencer
- 1829–1835: Sir William Inglis

=== Lieutenant-governors ===
- c.1760–1765?: James Molesworth
- 1764–1768: John Wynne
- 1768–1769: James St John Jeffereyes
- 1772–1778: William Hull a.k.a. William Tonson, 1st Baron Riversdale
- 1778–: John Leland
- 1796–1808: John Leland
- 1808–1815: Col. William Dickson
- 1815–1834: James Stirling
