= William Crosbie, 1st Earl of Glandore =

Irish politician

William Crosbie, 1st Earl of Glandore (May 1716 – 11 April 1781), known as The Lord Brandon between 1762 and 1771 and as The Viscount Crosbie between 1771 and 1776, was an Irish politician.

Crosbie was the son of Maurice Crosbie, 1st Baron Brandon, by Lady Elizabeth Anne, daughter of Thomas FitzMaurice, 1st Earl of Kerry. He was educated at Trinity College Dublin.

He was returned to the Irish House of Commons for Ardfert in 1735, a seat he held until 1762, when he succeeded his father in the barony and entered the Irish House of Lords. In 1770 he was appointed Custos Rotulorum of Kerry. He was created Viscount Crosbie, of Ardfert in the County of Kerry, in 1771, and was further honoured when he was made Earl of Glandore, in the County of Cork, in 1776.

== Marriages and succession ==
Lord Glandore was twice married. He married firstly Lady Theodosia, daughter of John Bligh, 1st Earl of Darnley and Theodosia Bligh, 10th Baroness Clifton, in 1745. They had two sons and three daughters. After her death in May 1777 he married secondly Jane, daughter of Edward Vesey and widow of John Ward, in 1777, six months after his first wife died. They had no issue. He died in April 1781 and was succeeded in the earldom by his only surviving son from his first marriage, John. The Countess of Glandore died in September 1787.

Parliament of Ireland
Preceded by Henry Rose; William Crosbie	Member of Parliament for Ardfert; 1735–1762; With: William Crosbie 1735–1743; Edmond Malone 1743–1758; Maurice Copinger 1758–1762	Succeeded by Maurice Copinger; Lancelot Crosbie
Peerage of Ireland
New creation	Earl of Glandore; 1776–1781	Succeeded by John Crosbie
New creation	Viscount Crosbie; 1771–1781	Succeeded by John Crosbie
Preceded by Maurice Crosbie	Baron Brandon; 1762–1781	Succeeded by John Crosbie
