= McGillicutty =

McGillicutty may refer to:

- Beulah McGillicutty a female wrestler in 1995 to 2009
- Dale McGillicutty a Teenage Mutant Ninja Turtles character in 1988–1989
- Elroy McGillicutty, a character in the 2006 season of Supernatural (TV series))
- Michael McGillicutty a male wrestler in NXT then WWE from 2010 to 2012, now known as Curtis Axel.

== See also ==
- McGillicuddy, a similar surname
