= Siege of Cork =

1690 siege of the Williamite War in Ireland

- Part of the Williamite War
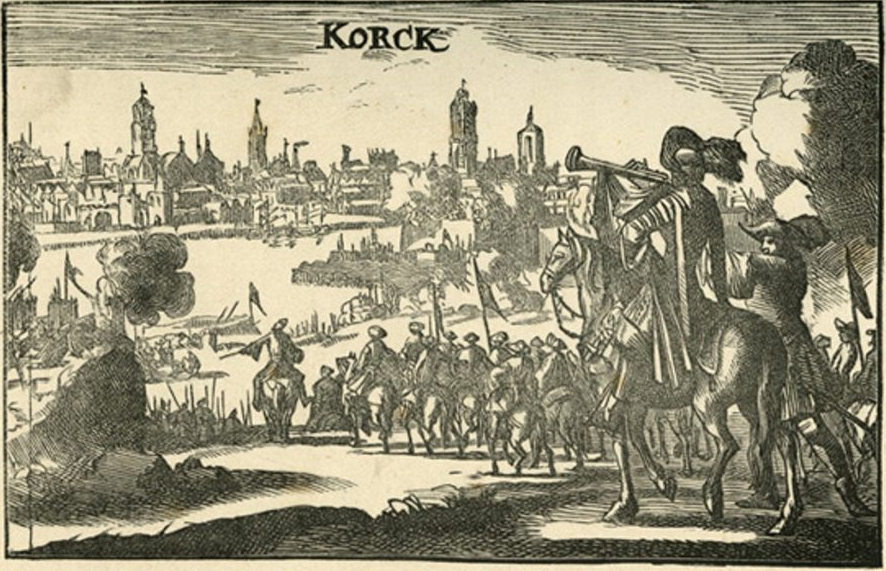
- Illustration titled "King William besieging Cork. Fac simile from a contemporary print" in A History of the City and County of Cork (1875) by M F Cusack
Date	September 1690
Location	Cork and Kinsale
Result	Williamite victory

Belligerents
Williamites and allies - English Army and Danish Auxiliary Corps	Jacobites

Commanders and leaders
Earl of Marlborough; Duke of Wurttemberg; Duke of Grafton †	Roger McElligott; Cornelius O'Driscoll †; Sir Edward Scott

Strength
9,000 troops and a naval fleet	Unknown

The siege of Cork took place during the Williamite war in Ireland in the year of 1690. It happened shortly after the Battle of the Boyne during James II's attempt to retake the English throne from King William III. In a combined land and sea operation, the Williamite commander, John Churchill, took the city and captured 5,000 Jacobites.

== Background ==
After the Battle of the Boyne, William occupied Dublin and the Jacobites retreated to the west of Ireland. William assaulted and besieged Limerick in August 1690 but was repulsed. To secure the Jacobite-held ports of Cork and Kinsale on the southern coast, he dispatched a force under John Churchill (then 1st Earl of Marlborough).

== Sieges ==
=== Cork ===
Marlborough reached Cork by sea on 21 September 1690. His English forces were 5,000 strong and he also had at his disposal a fleet which blockaded the port of Cork. He captured several of the harbour's defences (including Fort Camden) and landed troops at Passage West on 24 September, before setting up his base at Red Abbey, to the south of the walled city. Approaching from the northern, landward, side were 4,000 Danish troops under the Duke of Wurttemberg.

The Williamites took the forts (such as Elizabeth Fort) which commanded the hills around Cork and commenced a bombardment of the city from the heights. When a breach was opened in the city walls, the city's garrison opened surrender negotiations, asking to be allowed to leave Cork and join the main Jacobite army at Limerick. Marlborough refused the request, although Württemberg was in favour of granting the terms.

A few days later, the Williamites mounted a joint English-Danish assault of the breach from the south. Henry FitzRoy, Duke of Grafton was reputedly mortally wounded while leading this assault. After the Williamites reached the walls, the Governor of Cork, Roger McElligott, opened new surrender talks and agreed that the garrison would become prisoners and would surrender their arms and stores. Marlborough accepted and the city surrendered.

In spite of this, the Williamite troops sacked the city, did a great deal of damage, looting much property and abusing the Catholic inhabitants. Many civilians were killed before Württemberg and Marlborough restored order.

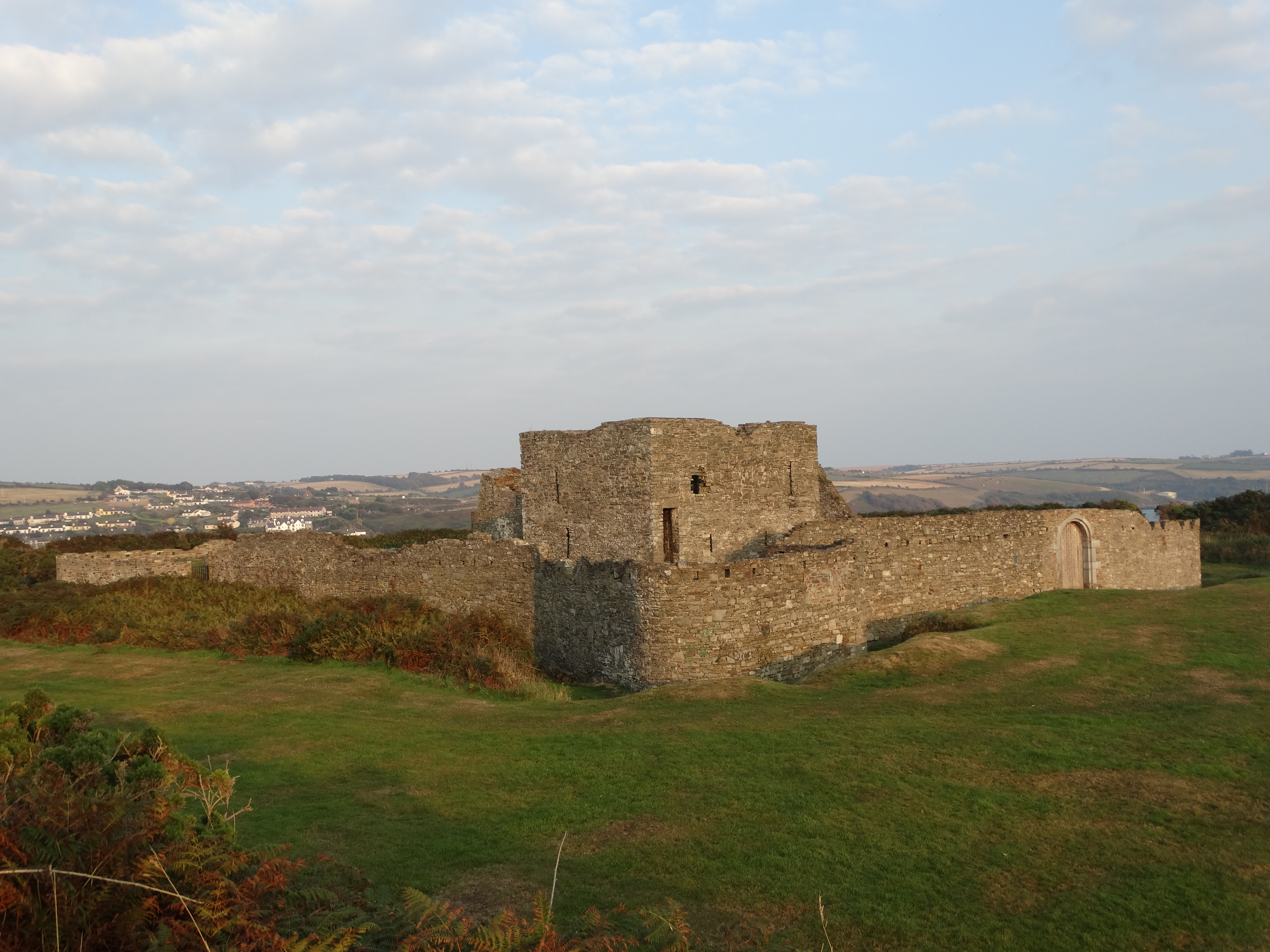
James's Fort, near Kinsale, was captured following an explosion in its gunpowder magazine

=== Kinsale ===
It remained for the Williamites to take nearby Kinsale which was strongly defended by two forts, the Old Fort, also known as James' Fort, and the New Fort or Charles Fort. Marlborough assaulted these fortifications but was unable to take them by storm. The Old Fort, defended by the Governor Colonel Cornelius O'Driscoll, fell after an assault was made possible by an accidental explosion in its gunpowder magazine, which killed 40. After some 200 were slain in the following assault, including Colonel O'Driscoll, the rest surrendered, receiving quarter. Charles Fort, however, held out for ten days and surrendered only after receiving guarantees that its 1,200-strong garrison could march away to Limerick. It was defended by the elderly and experienced Governor Sir Edward Scott, and his Deputy Governor Colonel Daniel O'Donovan.
