= Ardfert =

Village in County Kerry, Ireland

Ardfert Ard Fhearta
- Village
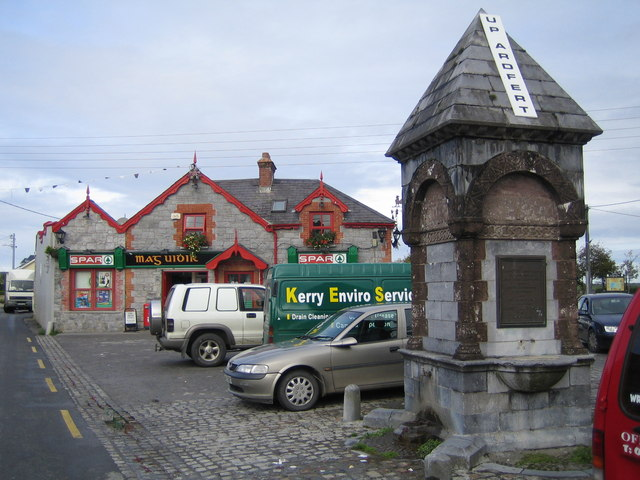
- Fountain at The Square in Ardfert

- Location in Ireland
- Coordinates: 52°21′00″N 9°41′00″W
- Country: Ireland
- Province: Munster
- County: County Kerry
- Elevation: 78 m (256 ft)

Population (2022)
  - Total: 771
- Time zone: UTC+0 (WET)
  - Summer (DST): UTC-1 (IST (WEST))
- Irish Grid Reference: Q782211

Ardfert (Irish: Ard Fhearta, meaning 'the hill of miracles') is a village and civil parish in County Kerry, Ireland. Historically a religious centre, the economy of the locality is driven by agriculture and its position as a dormitory town, being only 8 km (5 mi) from Tralee. The population of the village was 749 at the 2016 census.

== Origin ==
The village's name signifies, according to Sir James Ware, "a wonderful place on an eminence", or as some interpret it, "the hill of miracles." Ardfert has also been considered a corruption of Ard Ert, "the high place of Ert or Erc", so called after the fifth century Irish Bishop Saint Erc, who made the place a bishop's seat. Ardfert was written by the Four Masters as Ard-ferta, the height of the grave.

== History ==
Ardfert is a parish in the Barony of Clanmaurice, County Kerry, Ireland, anciently in the territory of Ui Fearba/Hy Ferba, of which the O'Laeghain (O'Leyne, Leen or Lane) were once the Gaelic Lords, until Norman invasion of Ireland.

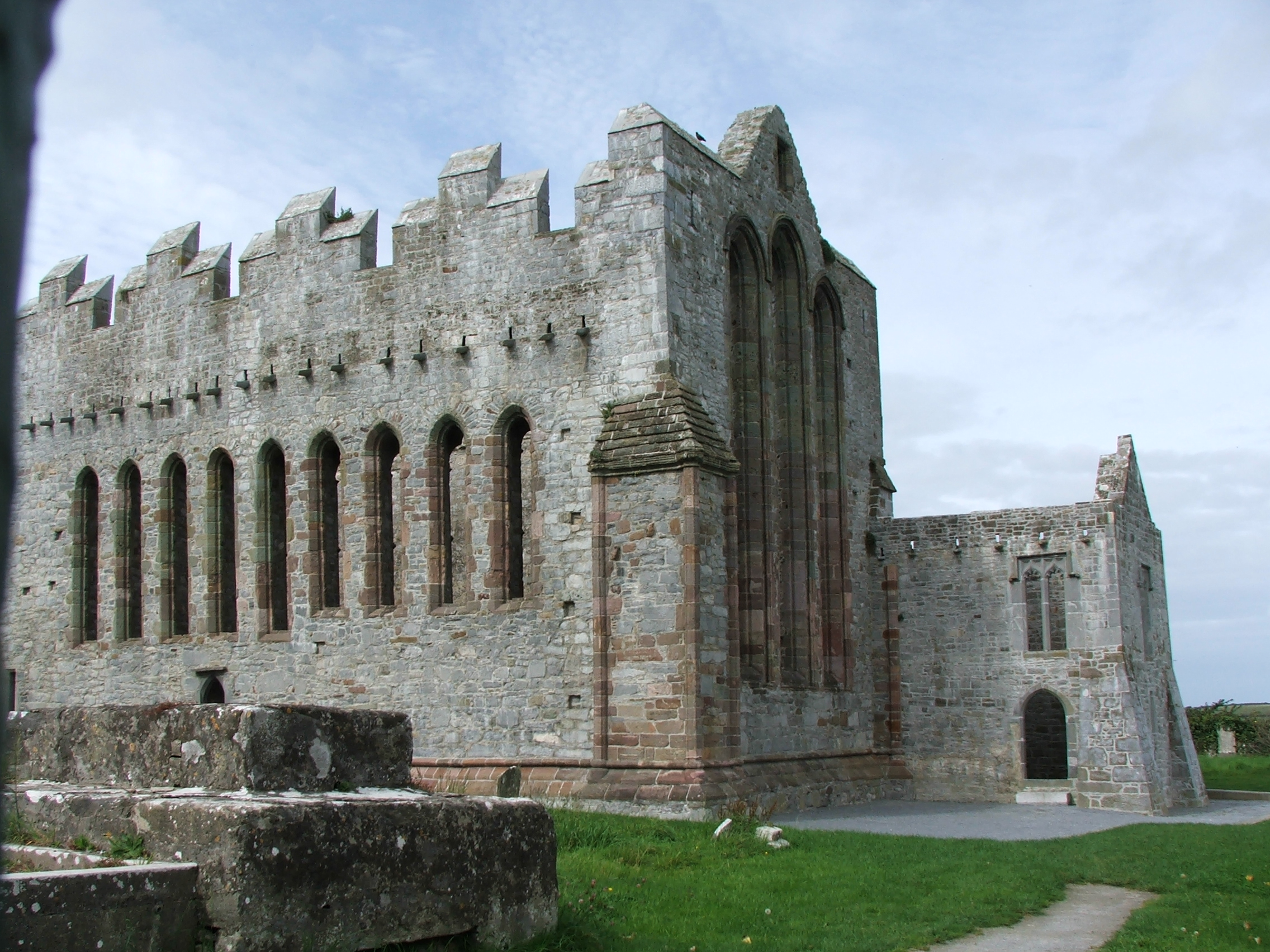
Ardfert Cathedral

Ardfert is the home of St. Brendan's Ardfert Cathedral, which was destroyed in the Irish Rebellion of 1641, and the birthplace of St. Brendan the Navigator, who was educated about the year 500 AD. He founded a monastery there in the sixth century, but both town and monastery were destroyed by fire in 1089, and again in 1151.

The Norman influence can still be seen not only in the architecture, but also in local family surnames such as the Cantillons (Barons de Ballyheigue), and Fitzmaurices, and in place names, such as Ballintobeenig, a nearby townland below Mt. Crusline called after St. Aubin. Thomas FitzMaurice, 1st Baron Kerry founded a Franciscan friary there in 1253, and Nicholas, the 2nd Lord Kerry, built a leper house there in 1312. It was the seat of a bishopric until 1660.

The Crusader Knights Hospitaller of the Order of Saint John of Jerusalem (later known as Knights of Malta), also had some rights in Ardfert, although there is a record of a dispute between them and the Franciscans in 1325 about the market cross and pillory. They had already been established in the area in c. 1200 when Meiler FitzHenry, grandson of King Henry I of England, and Justiciar of Ireland under King John, established a preceptory at Rattoo under a Fra' William from Dublin. Under the terms of a royal grant in letters patent of James I of England on 6 July 1612, the Lord of Kerry (FitzMaurice) could hold courts baron and leet.

The Annals of the Kingdom of Ireland, recount how in 1601, Prince Hugh Roe O'Donnell, on his way to the Battle of Kinsale, sent some of his kinsmen troops there to reconquer Ardfert, Lixnaw, and Ballykeally for his ally FitzMaurice. En route, he visited and venerated a relic of the True Cross (Holy rood) on the Feast of St. Andrew, on 30 November 1601, at Holy Cross Abbey, near Thurles, County Tipperary, which was a rallying point for the defence of religious freedom and for Irish sovereignty. From there he sent an expedition to Ardfert, to win a quick victory and recover the territory of his ally, Fitzmaurice, Lord of Kerry, who had lost it and his 9-year-old son, to Sir Charles Wilmot. The expedition captured Caislean Gearr (Short Castle, of which no trace remains), adjacent to the Cathedral in Ardfert. An O'Donnell from Tyrconnell remained behind in stewardship to hold it, according to "The Life of Hugh Roe O'Donnell, Prince of Tyrconnell"written by Lughaidh O'Cléirigh, circa 1603 in Gaelic.

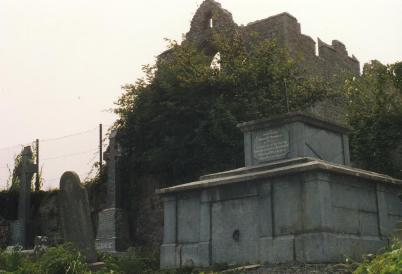
Tomb of John O'Donnell in the grounds of Ardfert Cathedral

A large tomb in the grounds of the cathedral was built much later by John O'Donnell (1803–1879), the most prominent descendant two centuries later, and whose own direct male descendant was the late Patrick Denis O'Donnell (1922–2005), the Irish military historian. He owned the summit overlooking Ardfert (Mt. Crusline, Ballintobeenig, from where his ancestral O'Donnell of Tyrconnell, under authority of Prince Hugh Roe O'Donnell would have launched the battle to regain Ardfert for Lord Kerry in 1601). The family seat of John O'Donnell, at Tubrid mentioned by Samuel Lewis in his 1837 Topographical Dictionary of Ireland, passed through a female line to the O'Carrolls. The house expanded by John O'Donnell in Tubridmore was listed as an intended "protected structure" in the archaeological monuments section of the draft Kerry County Development Plan 2015–2021.

In the early 19th century, the Earl of Listowel (Hare) was Lord of the manor and held court every three weeks in Ardfert, through an appointed Seneschal, having bought those rights from the Earl of Kerry, Fitzmaurice.

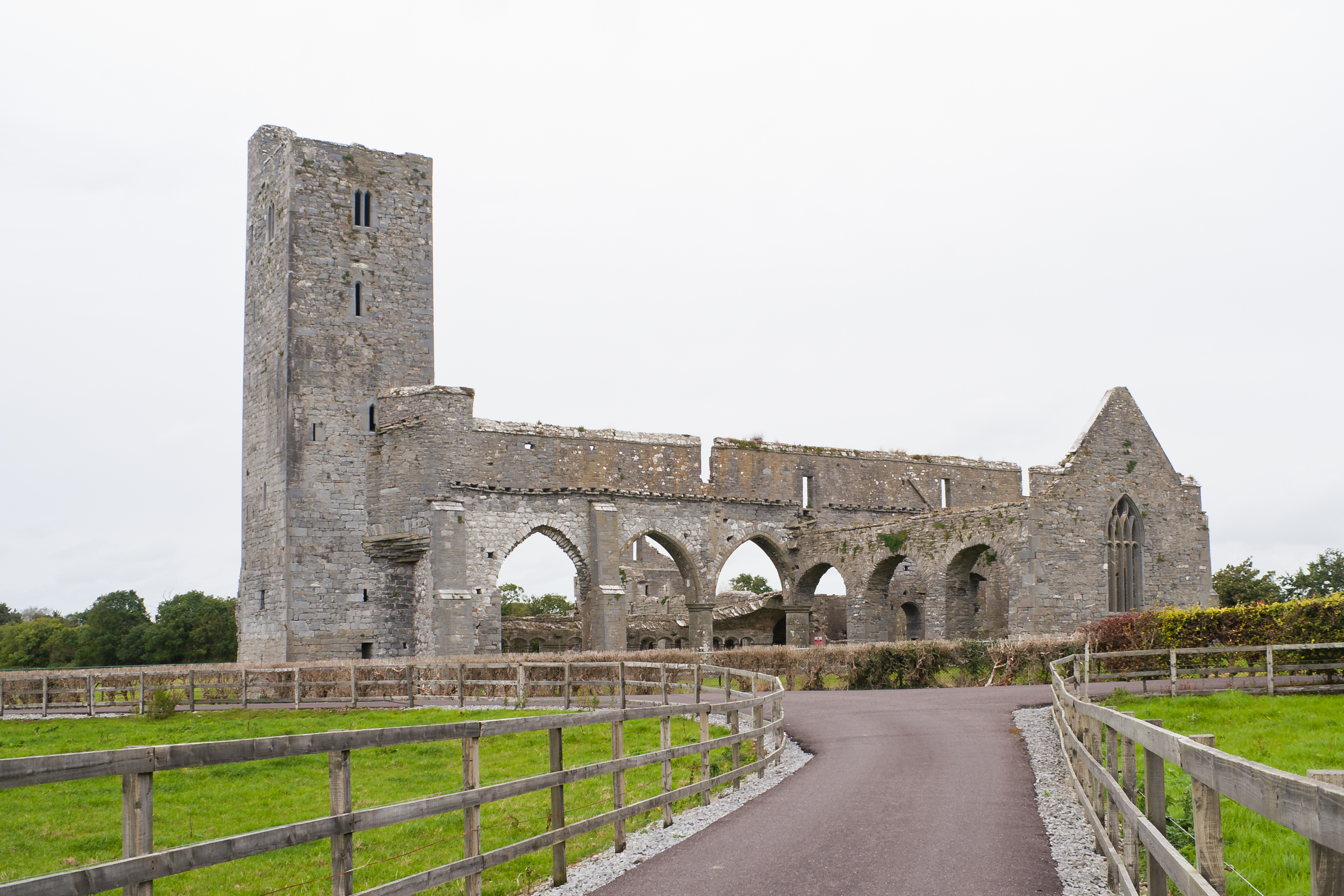
Ardfert Friary

The area's archaeological heritage includes the medieval cathedral, St. Brendan's, and associated churches, Temple na Hoe (Church of the young Virgin) and Temple na Griffin. Several have these have become heritage tourism attractions in the Kerry area due to their central location. The 13th century Franciscan Friary, to the north east of the village, was once an integral part of Ardfert Abbey - not an abbey at all but the name of the Talbot-Crosbie mansion destroyed by fire in 1922 by the IRA.

Five other structures included on the Record of Protected Structures (RPS) are located in Ardfert; St Brendan's Catholic Church (consecrated in 1855), the Old Gates of the Earl of Glandore's Demesne, the Talbot-Crosbie Memorial, the Ardfert Parish Room (now a site registered as derelict by Kerry County Council) and Brandon House. There are also many other structures within the village which are not included in the RPS, but are considered to be of considerable architectural and heritage value, such as the Ardfert Retreat Center. Also nearby are the surviving estate walls which contribute to the character and identity of the village.

== Geography and development ==
From the 17th century (possibly 1639) until 1800 the area was a borough constituency. The borough corporation (its local council) elected two members of the Irish House of Commons. The borough was disenfranchised by the Act of Union 1800, and from 1801 the area was represented as part of the county constituency of Kerry. Ardfert lost borough status under section 13 of the Municipal Corporations (Ireland) Act 1840. It was one of fifty-eight borough corporations dissolved on 25 October 1840. At this time, about a half-mile east of the cathedral, Ardfert Abbey was the home of the Crosbies, Baron Brandon, and contained the ruins of the old Franciscan Abbey. They also maintained a well-stocked deer-park and gardens.

In the 20 years between the 1996 and 2016 census of Ireland, the population of Ardfert village increased from 648 to 749 inhabitants.

It is located within an agricultural area, surrounded by flat and low-lying land. The main Tralee-Ballyheigue road bisects the village in an east–west axis, with road width restrictions on the western side of the village. To the north of the village, the Tyshe River traverses the village road network. The village settlement pattern is radial and dispersed and consists of a mixture of single site depth development along radial roads interspersed with housing estates. Within the core of the village there is a mix of dwelling types of various traditional designs. More modern design predominates in the one-off housing on the radial routes. The development of a central retail and social node has been constrained to some extent by need to protect historic buildings and monuments within the village.

== Economy and amenities ==
The village provides a number of goods and services to the local area and surrounding agricultural hinterland. Other developments have increased its role as a dormitory suburb for Tralee. The village also acts as a convenience stop for tourist and local through traffic. The village is served by social and retail services, including a Garda station, An Post post office, health centre, garage, petrol station and a number of retail outlets and public houses. In addition there is a Roman Catholic Church, a school and a community centre with gym and launderette. Planning permission for residential development has recently been permitted on the existing Gaelic Athletic Association (GAA) grounds, with replacement facilities planned elsewhere on the periphery of the village.

== Transport ==
Ardfert is located on the R551 regional road from Tralee to Ballyheigue. The village centre is located at a crossroads between the R551 and several local roads. The traffic is increased by the quarry to the north east of the village which generates HGV traffic movements through the village. During the summer months, the situation is exacerbated by tourist traffic to coastal locations. The Tralee-Ballyheigue road at the northern end of the village sees bottleneck delays in traffic into and out of the village.

Ardfert railway station, on the line from Limerick to Tralee via Newcastle West, opened on 20 December 1880. The station closed to passengers on 4 February 1963, and to freight on 2 June 1978. The track was lifted in 1988.

== Sport ==
=== Gaelic games ===
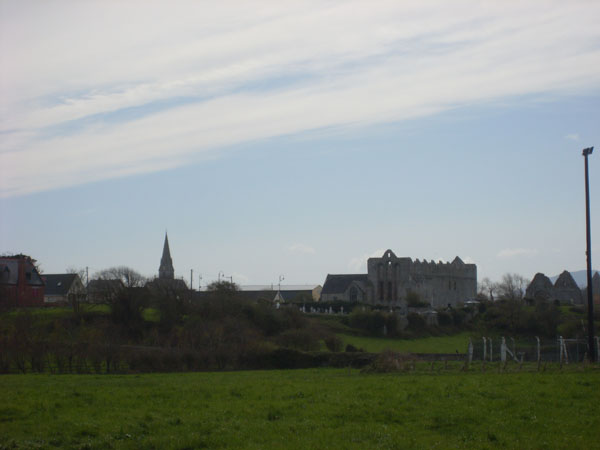
Ardfert from the G.A.A. field

Ardfert GAA, the local Gaelic football club, won the All-Ireland Junior Club Football Championship in Croke Park on 19 February 2006 beating Loughrea of Galway. The club's accomplishments also include winning the 2007 All-Ireland Intermediate Club Football Championship, defeating Derry and Ulster Champions Eoghan Rua, on 10 March 2007 again in Croke Park.

The local hurling club is St Brendan's, Ardfert. They have won the Kerry Senior Hurling Championship on 8 occasions, most recently in 2013.

=== Other sports ===
A short lived greyhound racing track was opened in the village on 21 August 1929. The venture run by the Kingdom Greyhound Racing Club and only lasted until Wednesday 25 September 1929. The last race was the Ardfert Stake which was won by Captain Off, the even money favourite. The main reason for the closure was that a larger track called Oakview Park (to the south in Oakview Village) was due to open.

The eventing horse "Village Gossip", ridden between 1976 and 1985 by British team rider Lucinda Green (née Prior Palmer), was born and bred in Ardfert. He completed Badminton Horse Trials on several occasions, placing second in 1978 and was the fastest competitor at the World Three Day Event in Lexington, Kentucky, the same year.

== See also ==
- Ardfert (constituency)
- List of abbeys and priories in Ireland (County Kerry)
- List of towns and villages in Ireland
