= Alf's Imperial Army =

Pacifist organisation in New Zealand

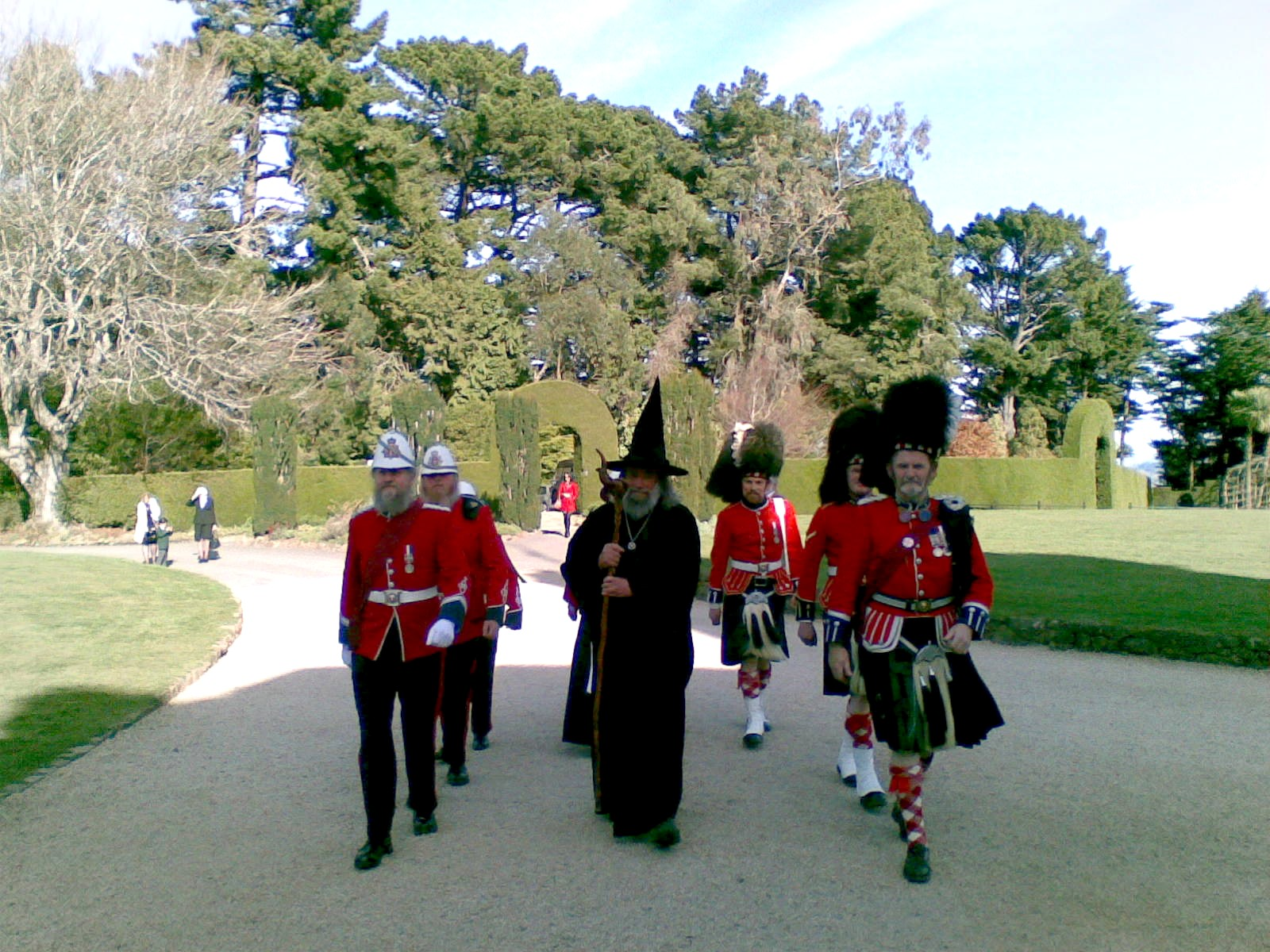
The Wizard of New Zealand escorted by members of Alf's Imperial Army

Alf's Imperial Army is an organisation in New Zealand centred on the idea of "pacifist warfare", a form of mock combat. It is very loosely organised along military lines, and has or had regiments present in several towns and cities in the country. As a self-declared "army," it exists to "battle" using strictly non-harmful weapons. The group identifies their battles as akin to theatrical performances.

== History ==
Alf's Imperial Army, along with the concept of pacifist warfare, was created by Ian Brackenbury Channell, who is now known as the Wizard of New Zealand, in 1972 at the University of Melbourne. In 1973, Anthony Catford, a follower of the Wizard, moved to New Zealand and founded the 1st Canterbury Crusaders Regiment (later renamed the 1st Canterbury Light Infantry) in Christchurch. He organised the group's first battle at the city's University of Canterbury before moving to Wellington.

By late 2023, the Army had reduced public engagements and largely withdrawn from university campuses. Active regiments are still present in Christchurch, Hamilton, and Oamaru, The Wizard still fills the role of Spiritual Leader of the Army.

== Mythos and activities ==
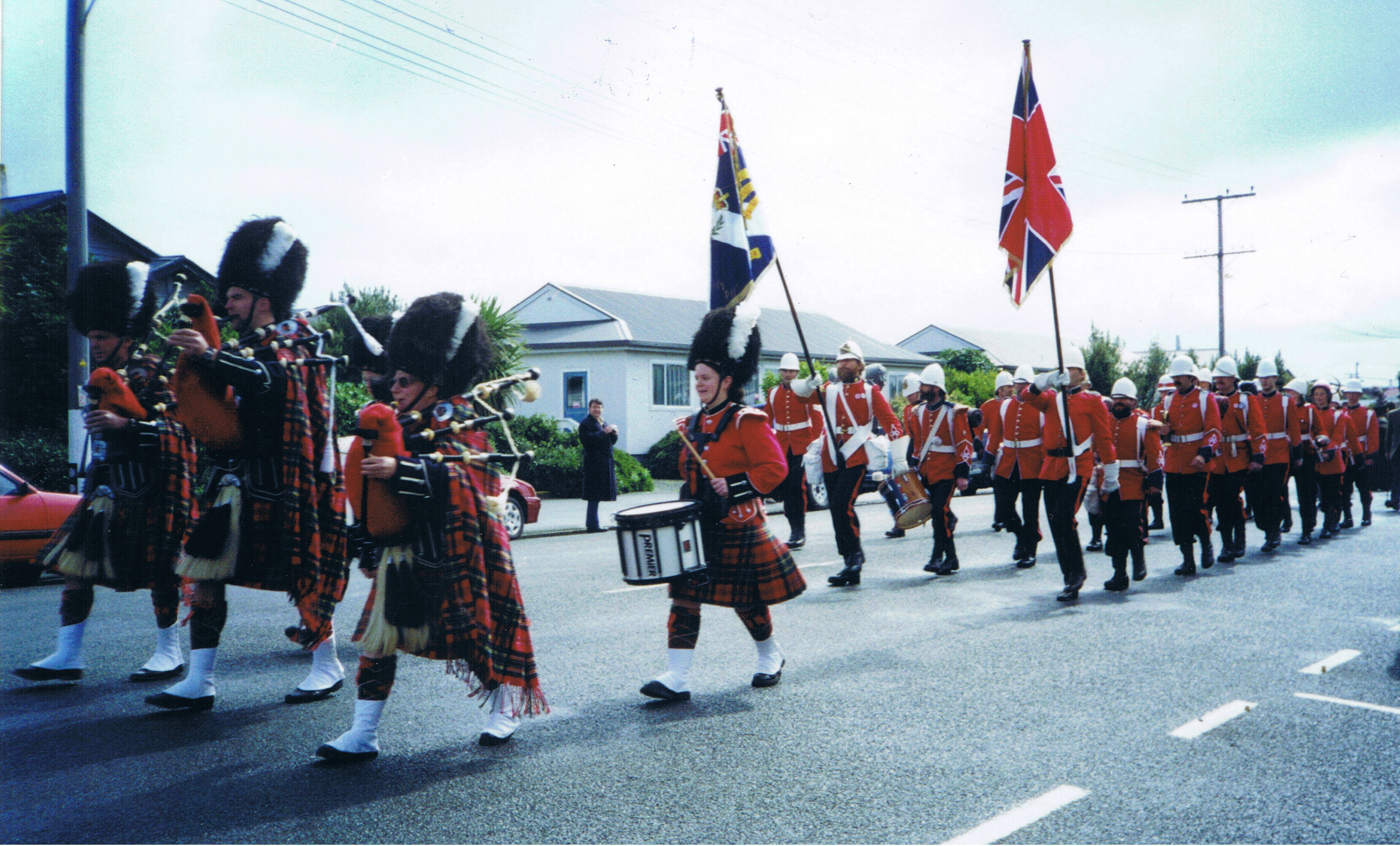
Alf's Imperial Army march to battle the Green Party in October 2000.

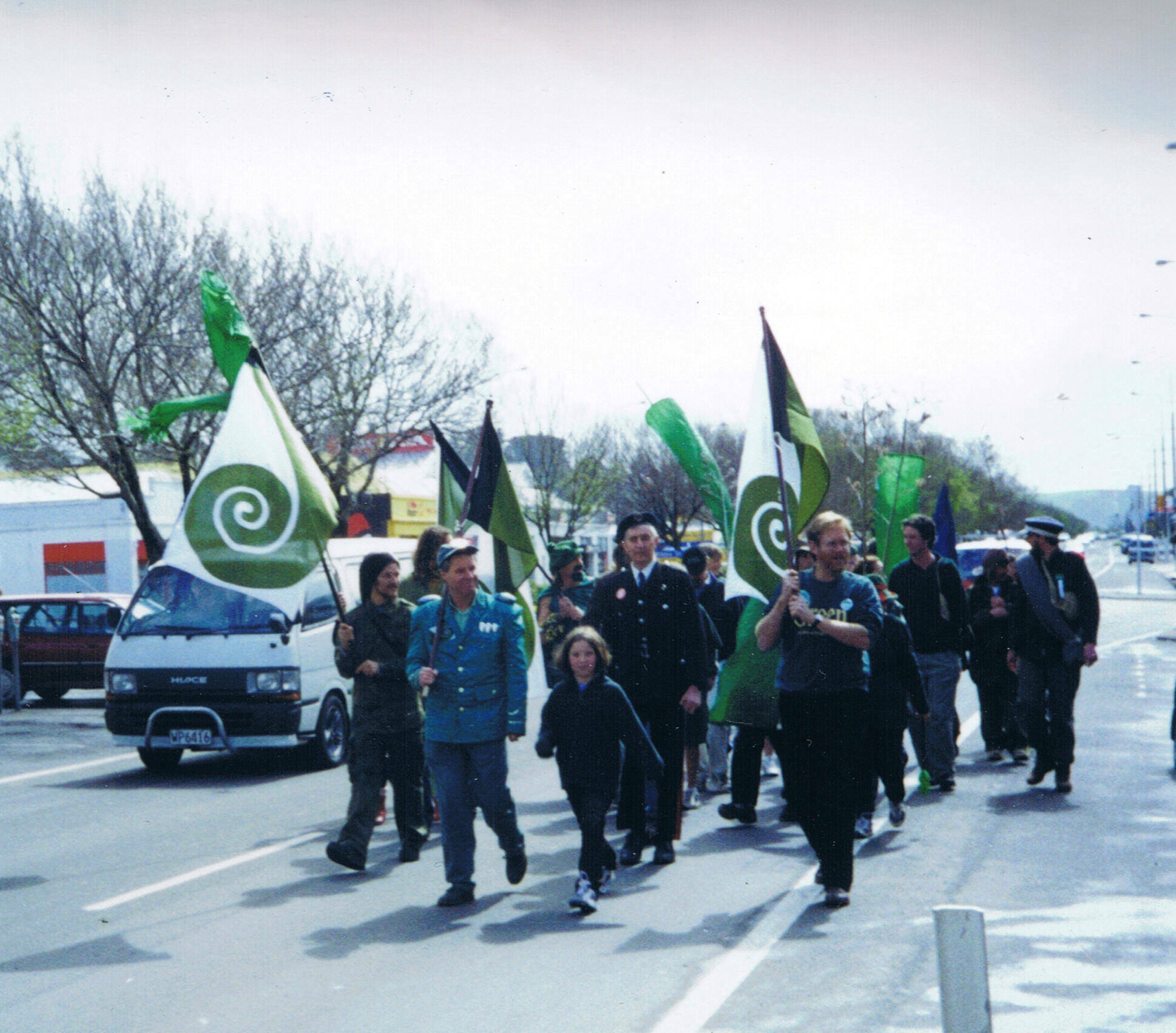
Green Party Forces march to battle Alf's in October 2000.

The Army fights battles in the name of King Charles III as self-declared monarchists. Battles between the Army and other groups usually occur in public places and are intended as theatrical displays rather than historical reenactment. Though the mythos and uniforms are modeled after Victorian British soldiers, particularly redcoats, the uniforms and weapons are not historically accurate and no past event is reenacted.

As proponents of "pacifist warfare", the Army fights using strictly non-harmful weapons, such as newspaper swords and cardboard shields, other "weapons" include bombs filled with water, flour, and porridge; "mass effect" weapons include large slingshots and mortars armed with soft fruit, water bombs, or flour bombs. The group's psychological warfare tactics include can-can charges, "assault" poetry, group singing, and taunting. In battle, participants wear costumes or uniforms and play roles such as scouts, magicians, witches, scribes, and photographers. Nurses, medics, and surgeons have the ability to bring "dead" fighters back to life by dispensing candy as medication and liquid (often port wine or water) as elixirs. Unlike live-action role-playing (which came into existence after Alf's Imperial Army), battle participants do not play individual named characters and there are no hit points or character generation or levels. There is no larger fictive role-playing world that battles are part of and there is generally no ongoing story from battle to battle.

There is no fixed way to determine the winner and groups may agree to disagree on the outcome as an excuse to battle again in the future. Winning may also depend on which group is best at telling a story or writing the history of the battle, or who the audience thinks performed most memorably. Some battles are pre-scripted.

In October 2000, the Army battled 40 New Zealand Green Party members, who fought under the name Green Republicans, in Oamaru. The Green Party group was led by Keith Locke and claimed afterwards that they had won since all Alf's Imperial Army soldiers died by "suicide". The Army has also fought against other political parties, the New Zealand Police, student clubs, student hostels, Outward Bound, community organisations, sea cadets, schools, TV stations, nudist organisations, and other pacifist warfare groups. Since the inception of Alf's Imperial Army, other similar pacifist warfare groups, many of them unaffiliated with the Army, have been established around New Zealand, including the McGillicuddy Highland Army, the Waitati Militia, and the Czarist Russia-influenced First Lindskii Regiment. One of the Army's main rivals was the McGillicuddy Highland Army.

== Regiments ==
=== Active ===
- 1st Canterbury Light Infantry (1973), Christchurch. Rarely active. The regiment has a 'B Company' in Tākaka.
- 2nd Duke of Wellington's Own (Boots) Regt (1975), Wellington. Disbanded in 1999; reformed and reactivated as a "Messing" Regiment in 2006.
- 5th Waikato Dragoons (1985), Hamilton. Actively battles every 4–5 weeks.
- 7th Whitestone Grenadiers (1988), Oamaru. Re-established as 8th Regiment after a period of inactivity.
- KNUTS Artillery Regiment (2008), Christchurch
- 13th Lady Penelope's Own Mounted Defaulters (2022), Tauranga. Established as a Platoon for Initiated Alfs serving a sentence of Field Punishment.

=== Inactive ===
- 0th Melbourne Regt (1972), Melbourne
- 3rd New Edinburgh Highland Regt (1977), Dunedin. Reformed in 1981 when the Scottish-themed originals became the Highland Co. and the Arrows Musical Appreciation and Drinking Society became the Grenadier Co. The latter's leader, Algy Larsen, is credited with introducing formal uniforms to the Army.
- The Auckland Regiment (1979), Auckland. Never formally numbered, disbanded.
- The Hawke's Bay Militia (1979), Hawke's Bay. Never formally numbered, disbanded.
- 4th Lady Massey's Volunteers (1980–1986), Palmerston North
- 5th Waikato Cavalry (1980-82), Hamilton. Disbanded 1982.
- 6th Irish Light Infantry (1986), Gisborne.
- 7th Cargill Dragoons (1987), Invercargill. Left Alf's Army.
- 8th Bombay Grenadiers (1988), Auckland.
- 10th Auckland Grenadiers (1989), Auckland. Merged with 8th Bombay Grenadiers
- 10th Podian Phoenix Regt (1990), London.
- 12th New Plymouth Regt of Foot (1991), New Plymouth.
- 16th Wellington Wegiment (2004–2018), Wellington.
- 17th Cotswold Volunteers (2011–2012), Auckland
