= Roger McElligott =

Irish Jacobite soldier and politician

Colonel Roger McElligott (died after 1714) was an Irish Jacobite soldier and politician.

== Biography ==
McElligott raised a regiment in County Kerry for James II of England, which was located at Hampton Court in 1688. That year McElligott and his regiment returned to Ireland. Following the Glorious Revolution, McElligott was the Member of Parliament for Ardfert in the short-lived Patriot Parliament called by James in 1689. In 1690 he was appointed Governor of Cork, in which capacity he surrendered the city to Williamite forces following the Siege of Cork.

McElligott was taken prisoner and imprisoned in the Tower of London until June 1697, when he was released. He travelled immediately to France, where he became colonel of the Regiment of Clancarty in the Irish Brigade. The regiment was present at the Siege of Barcelona in 1713–14. It is unknown when or where McElligott died, although he likely remained in French service for the rest of his life.

Parliament of Ireland
Preceded by Thomas Amory; John Carricke	Member of Parliament for Ardfert; 1689; With: Cornelius MacGillicuddy	Succeeded by Christopher Dominick; Andrew Young
Military offices
Preceded by Viscount Clare	Governor of Cork; 1690	Succeeded by Colonel Hales; Colonel Hastings
