= Cornelius MacGillicuddy =

Irish politician (died 1712)

For other people with the same name, see McGillicuddy

Cornelius MacGillicuddy (died November 1712) was an Irish Jacobite politician.

MacGillicuddy was the son of Donough MacGillicuddy. In 1688 he was granted a commission as a captain in Lord Slane's Regiment of Foot. MacGillicuddy was elected as a Member of Parliament for Ardfert in the short-lived Patriot Parliament summoned by James II of England in 1689. Despite his Jacobitism, he was included in the pardon afforded by the Articles of Limerick and in 1694 he took an oath of allegiance to William III of England. He experienced great financial difficulties, and in 1698 he mortgaged his entire property to David Crosbie of Ardfert. He died in 1712.

Parliament of Ireland
Preceded by Thomas Amory; John Carricke	Member of Parliament for Ardfert; 1689; With: Roger McElligott	Succeeded by Christopher Dominick; Andrew Young
