= Ardfert Abbey =

Ruined Franciscan friary in Kerry, Ireland

- Mainistir Ard Fhearta
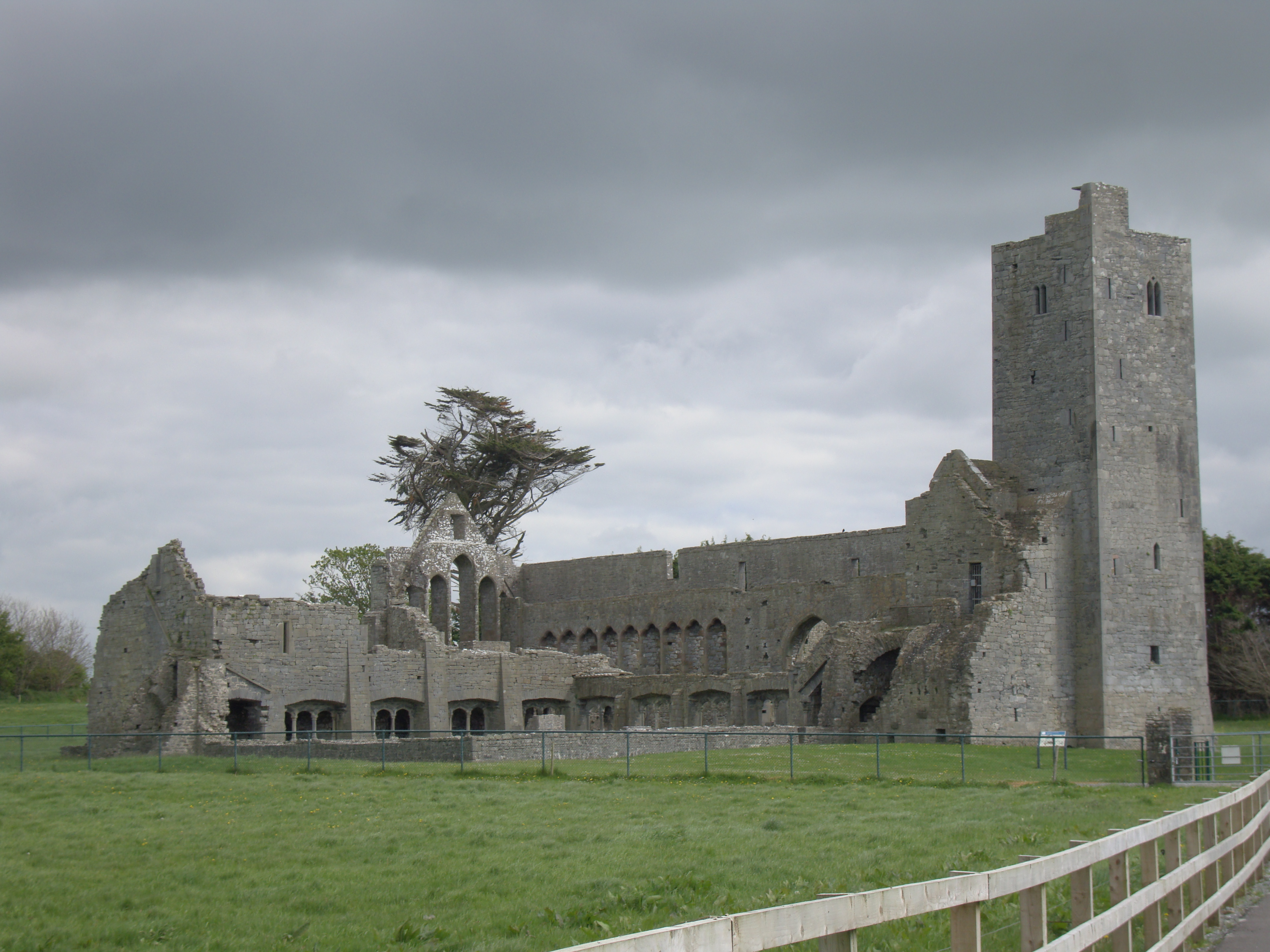
- Ruins of the abbey church

- Location within Ireland
- Interactive map of Ardfert Abbey

Monastery information
- Other names: Ard-ferta-brenainn; Hertfert; Hyferte; Ifert
- Order: Order of Friars Minor Conventual
- Established: c. 1253
- Disestablished: 1584
- Diocese: Ardfert and Aghadoe

People
- Founder: Thomas Fitzmaurice, 1st Baron Kerry

Architecture
- Status: Inactive
- Style: Late Gothic

Site
- Location: Ardfert, County Kerry
- Coordinates: 52.330162°N 9.773831°W
- Visible remains: choir, nave, cloister, dormitory
- Public access: yes

Ardfert Abbey (Irish: Mainistir Ard Fhearta), also known as Ardfert Friary, is a ruined medieval Franciscan friary and National Monument in Ardfert, County Kerry, Ireland. It is thought to be built on the site of an early Christian monastic site founded by Brendan the Navigator. The present remains date from the mid-thirteenth century, with the residential tower being added in the 15th century. The friary was dissolved in 1584.

== History ==
It is thought that Ardfert was the original site of the monastery founded by Brendan the Navigator, which burned down c.1089.

Ardfert Friary was founded for the Order of Friars Minor Conventual c. 1253 by Thomas Fitzmaurice, 1st Baron Kerry; he was purportedly buried here c. 1280–81. In 1310 a disagreement with the Bishop of Ardfert and Aghadoe Nicol Ó Samradáin led to some friars suffering violent beatings.

A residential tower was added to the west end of the church in the 15th century.

It was refounded in 1517 for the Observant Franciscan Friars and finally dissolved in 1584; Col. John Zouche turned it into a barracks. Some friars remained in the area. In 1590 it belonged to James FitzGerald, 1st Earl of Desmond.

In 1636 the friary was absorbed into the estate of the Earls of Glandore (Crosbie family). In 1670 the 15th-century window of the church was moved to Ardfert Cathedral; it was returned to the friary in 1815.

== Buildings ==
The layout of the building follows the standard layout of most Franciscan friaries: a large church, a cloister, and residential offices.

The church features a long nave and a chancel. A residential tower was added to the west end in the 15th century. It contains five floors, some with window seats and garderobes.

There is a thirteenth-century window divided into five lights at the east gable which would have lit up the choir. There are also nine lancet windows in the south wall; the design appears to be copied from Ardfert Cathedral.

Below the nine south windows there are 5 niche tombs added in the later centuries.

== Gallery ==
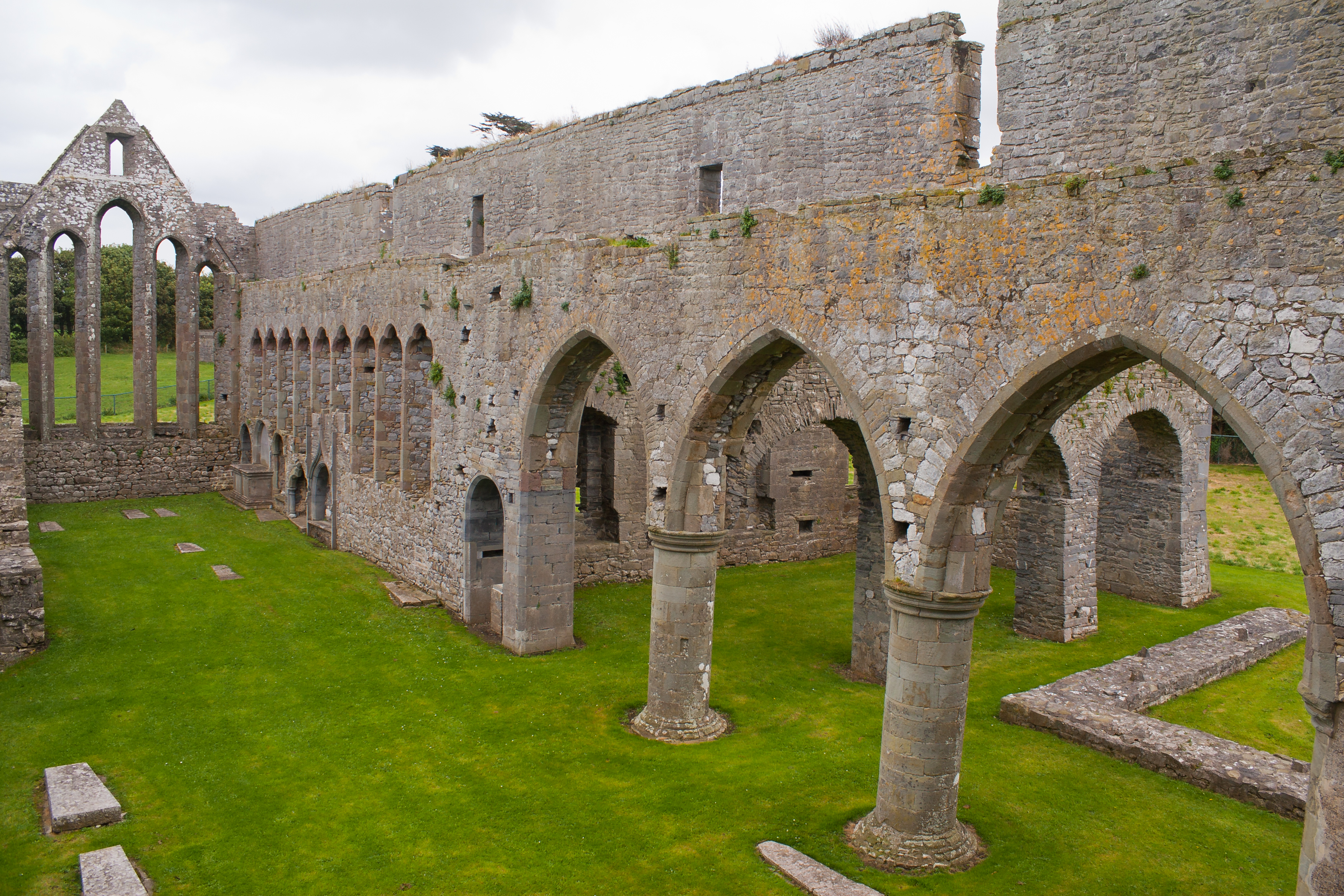
Nave and choir

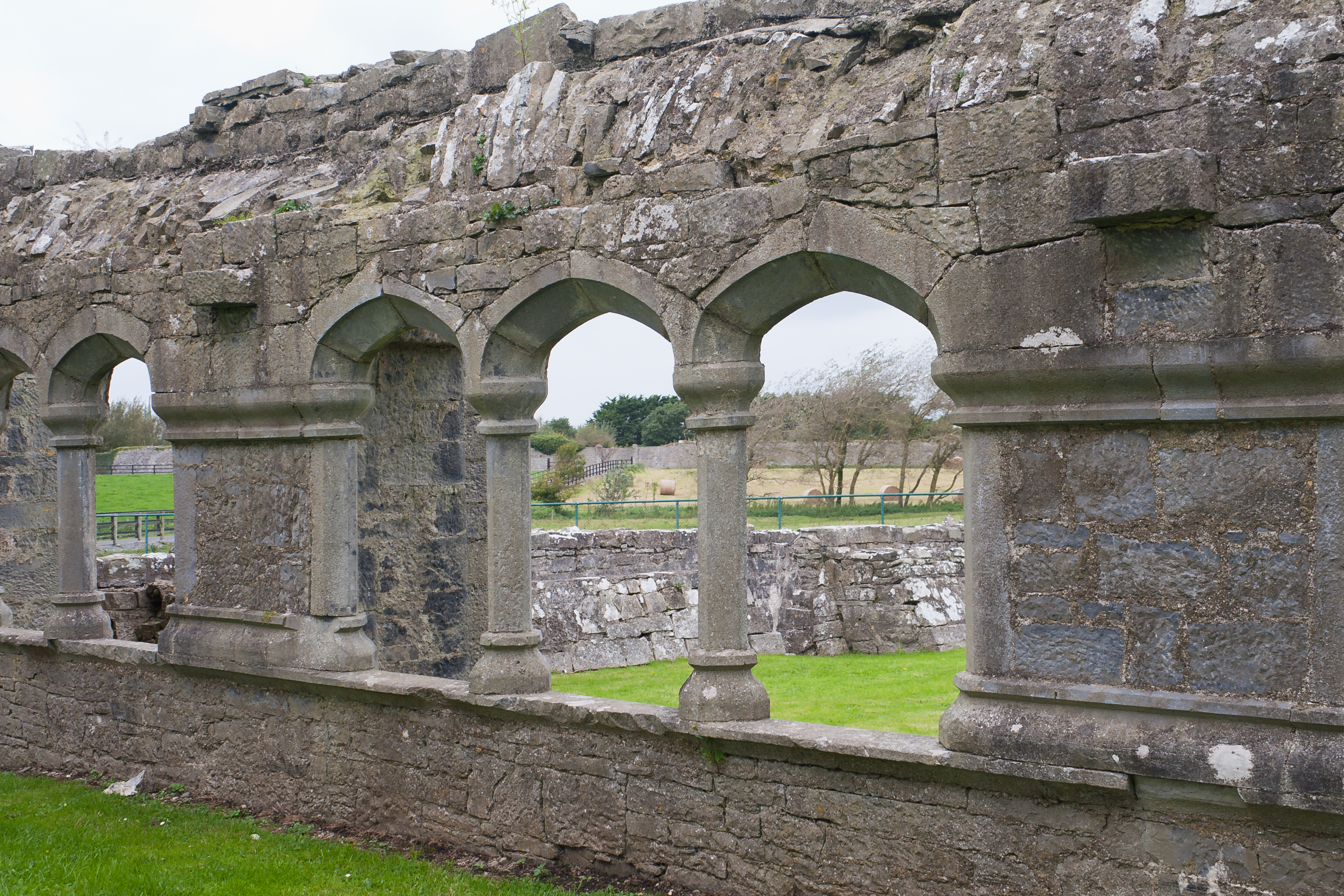
Cloister walk

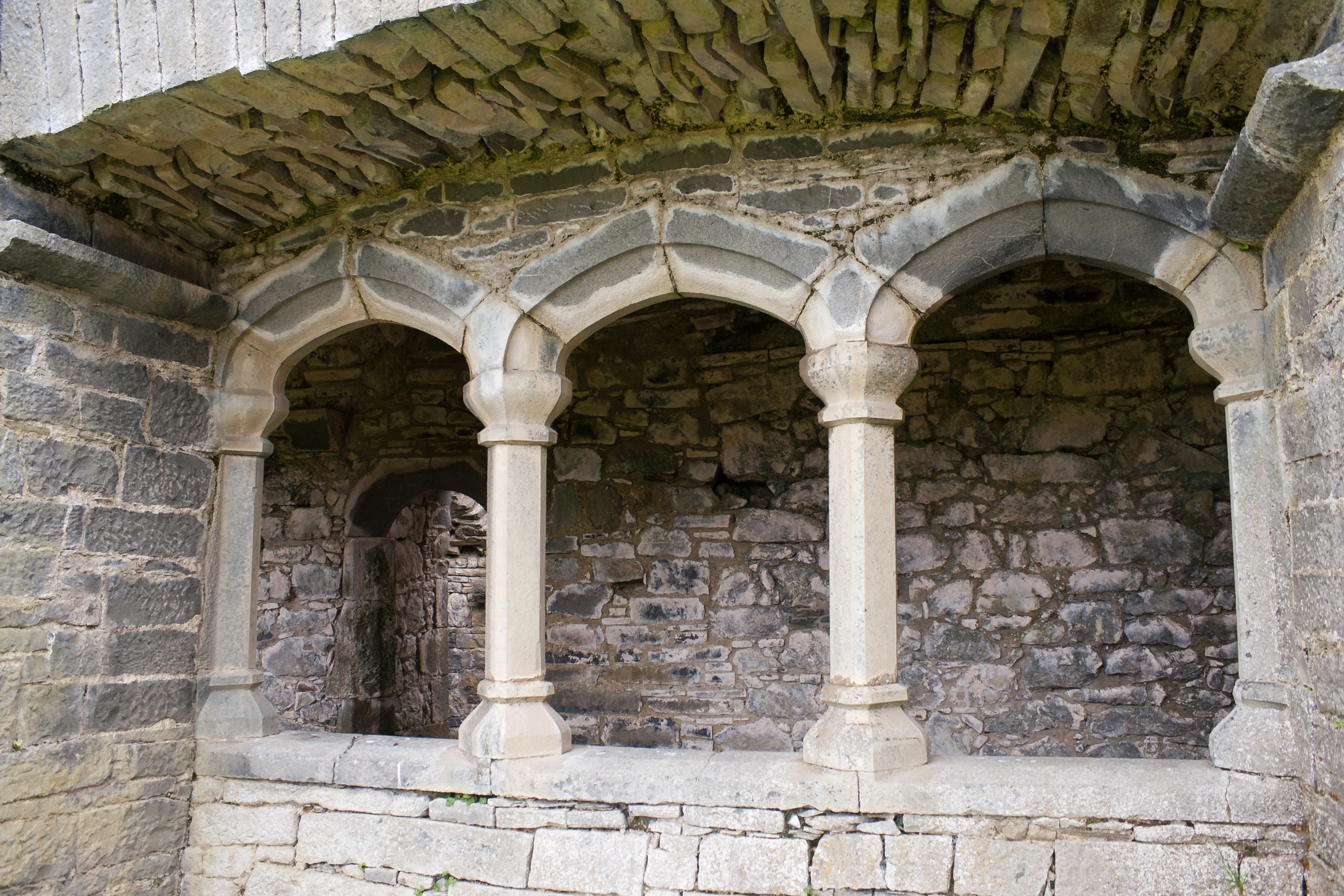
Cloister arcades

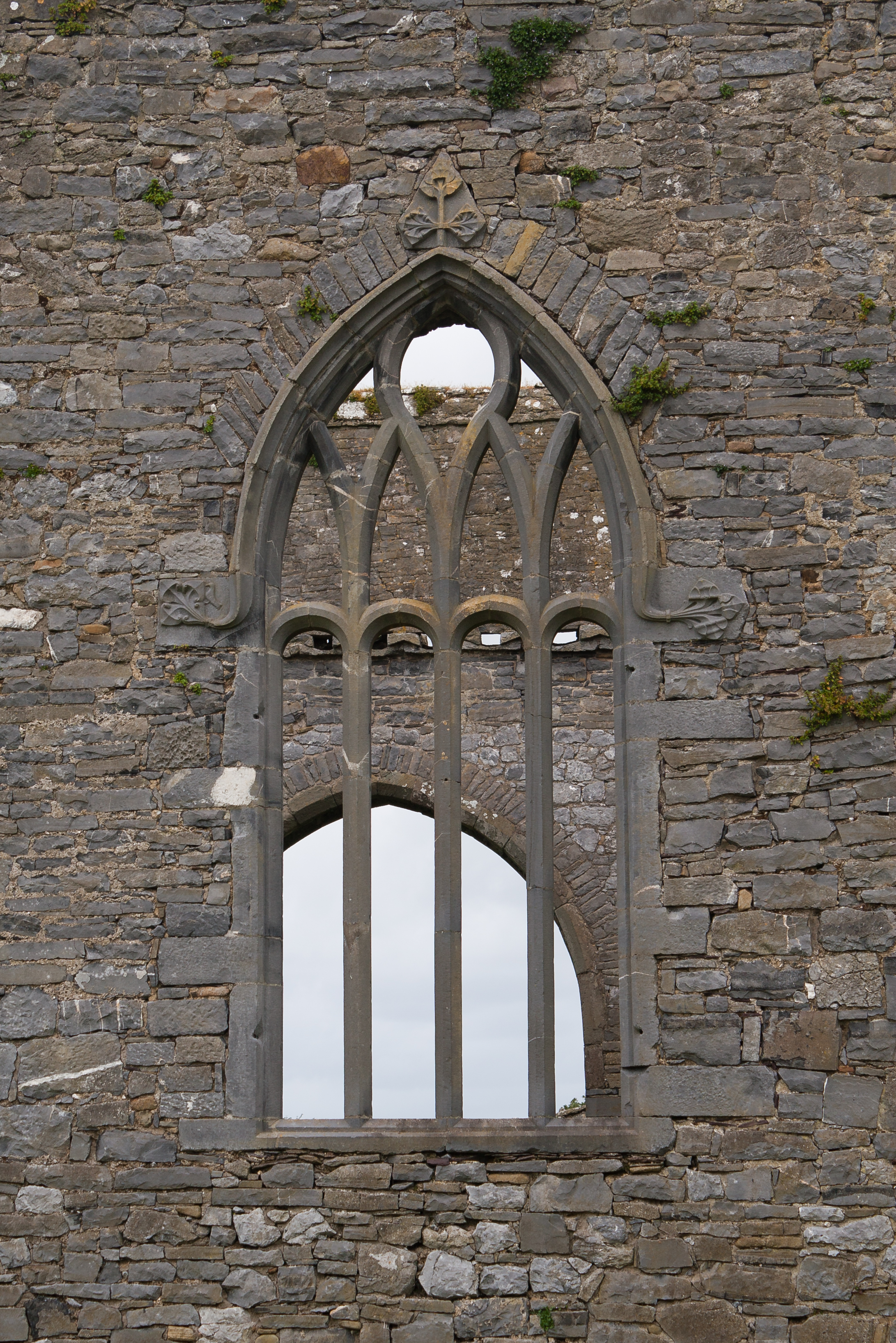
South window

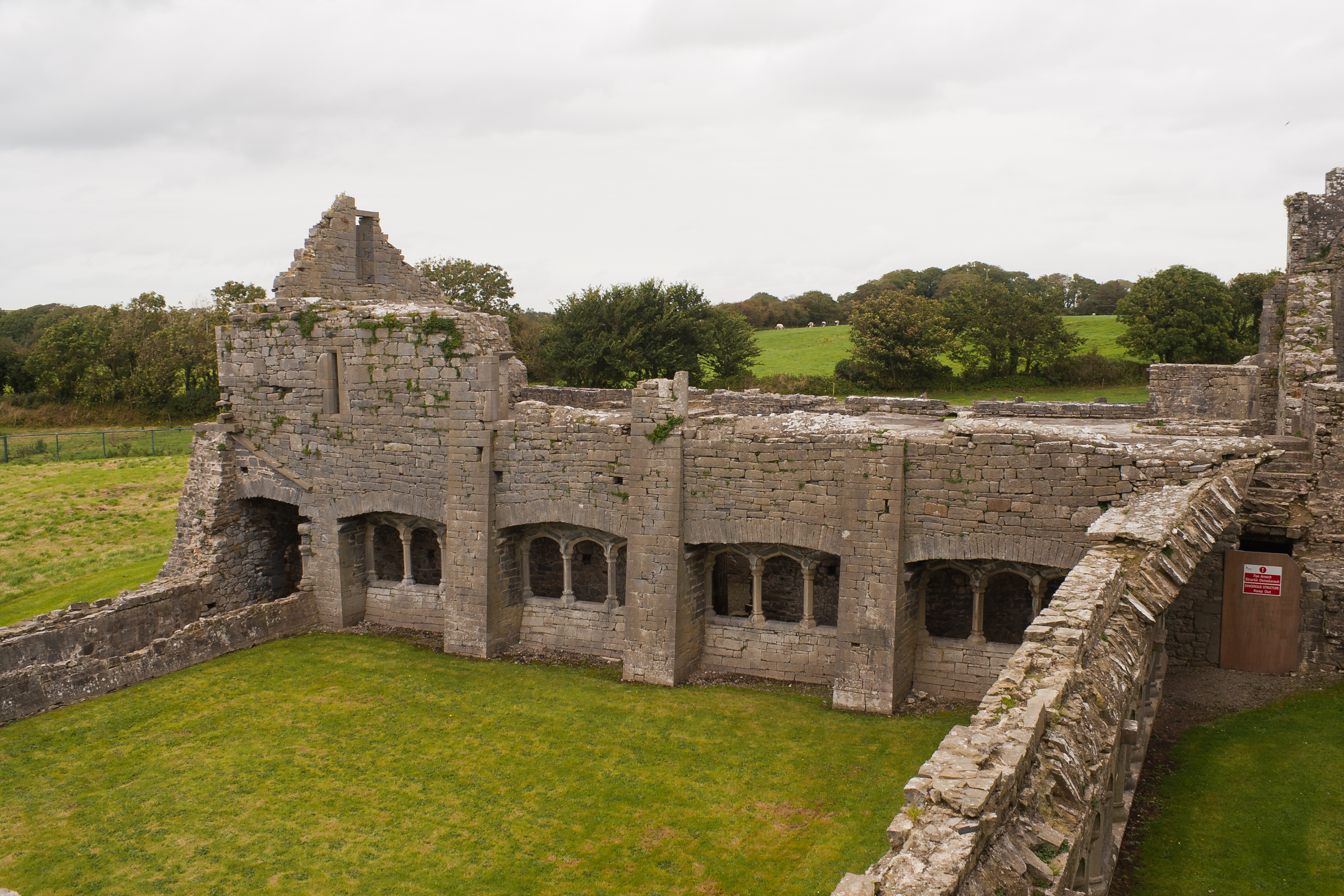
Cloister and dormitory

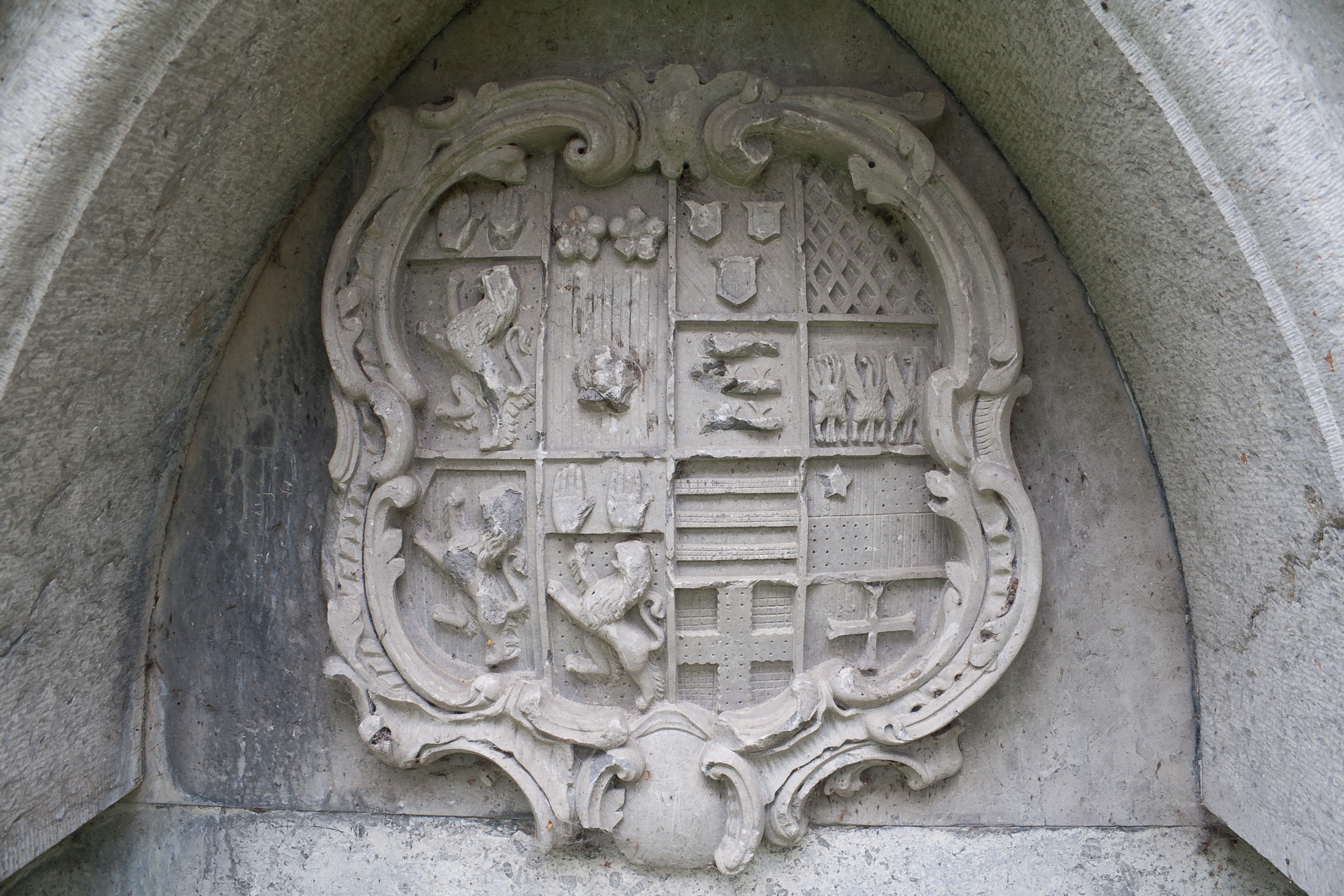
Arms of Susan Ann Crosbie

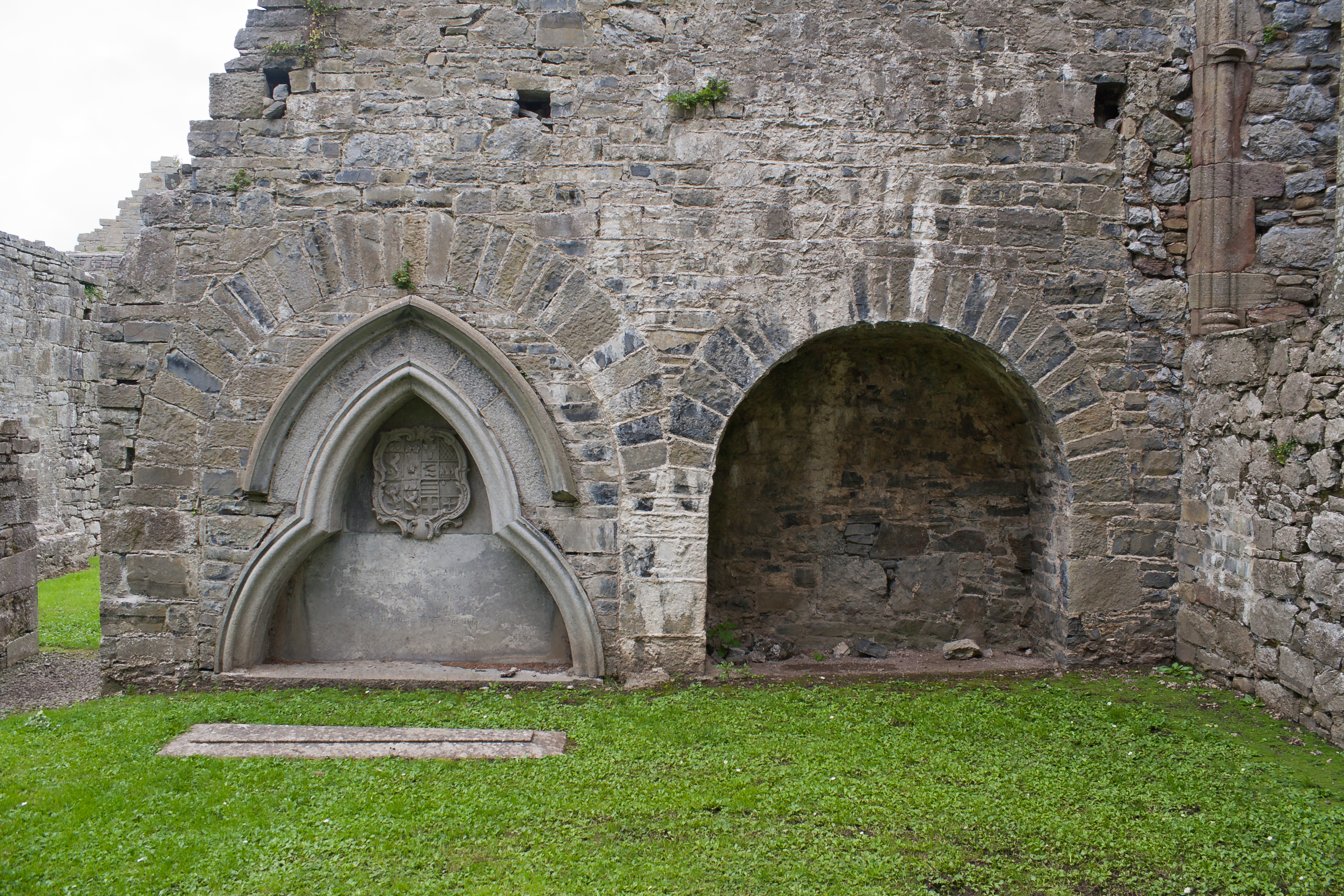
Tomb niches

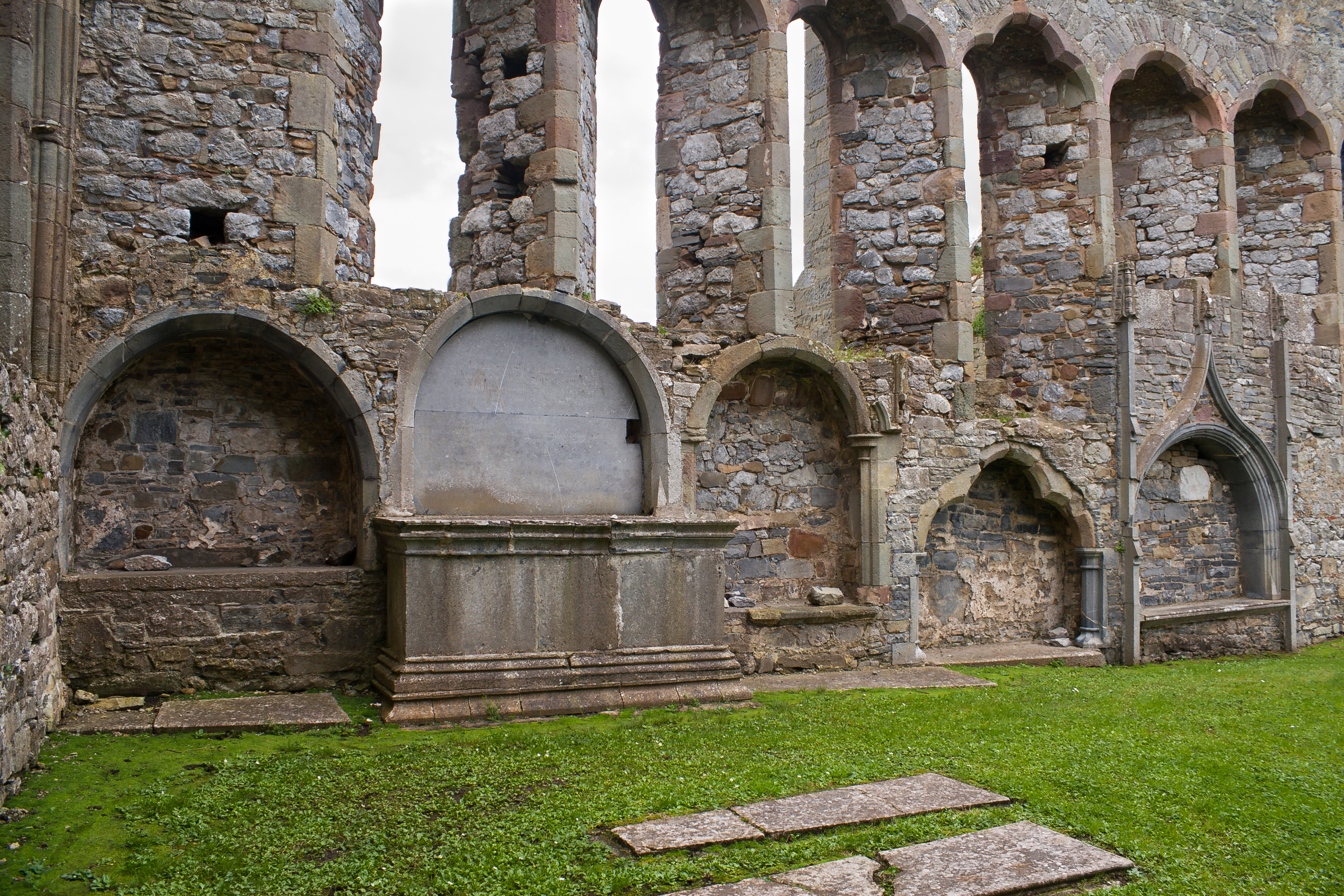
Tomb niches
