= McGillicuddy Highland Army =

Joke army in New Zealand

McGillicuddies at the Battle of Wellington St Beach, Hamilton, New Zealand, October 2002.

The McGillicuddy Highland Army is the fighting wing of New Zealand's Clan McGillicuddy and does battle with enemies of the Clan in accordance with the rules of the pastime of pacifist warfare. Battles have taken place at wide range of locations and events around the country. During the period 1984–1999 it shared many members in common with the Clan's political wing, the better-known McGillicuddy Serious Party.

== Origins ==
The McGillicuddy Highland Army (McGHA) was established in Hamilton, New Zealand, in 1978 as the McGillicuddy Highland Regiment, the battling wing of the Clan McGillicuddy. Its foundation was inspired by a pacifist battle that Clan leader Graeme Cairns, the Laird of Hamilton, had taken part in Dunedin earlier that year involving Alf's Imperial Army (Alf's).

== Weapons ==
As required by the rules of pacifist warfare, the McGHA fights its battles using strictly non-harmful weapons, such as newspaper swords and cardboard shields for personal duelling. 'Mass effect' weapons such as water bombs, flour bombs, porridge bombs, funnelators (huge slingshots), and meths mortars armed with soft or rotten fruit are also used (though water and flour bombs are the most common). 'Psychological Weapons' such as the Can-Can charge, heavy duty assault poetry, mass singing and vicious taunting are also permissible.

== Uniforms ==
The basic uniform of the McGHA regiments was a white shirt, kilt, and bonnet with a white cockade, with a doublet faced in the regiment's colour. How strongly military the uniform looked varied depending upon the individuals in a regiment; whilst there were very strong variations between the regiments themselves. Appearances ranged from 17th century Scottish Jacobites to 19th century Victorian British Scots, to South American Presidential Guard, to hippies or anarchists, with the only article in common being a kilt. One regiment even wore tartan trousers combined with Russian-style jackets and fur hats.

== Enemies ==
The Clan McGillicuddy being a Jacobite Clan, its Army naturally fought for the restoration of the Stuarts to the throne of New Zealand and Scotland. A strong rivalry with Alf's Imperial Army soon developed, as the McGHA evolved their own idiosyncratic interpretation of pacifist warfare.

The regiments developed into the Clan's 'standing army' with uniformed troops ready to swing into battle against the McGillicuddy Serious Party's political opponents, the Cambridge Borough Council, and various 'irregular' pacifist warfare groups such as folkies, nudists, hippies, anarchists, Outward Bound, student clubs and student hostels.

Other uniformed 'regular' opponents, include such groups as Alf's Imperial Army, The Fort Custard Fire Dept, Black Mac's Death's Head Hussars, the Seaweed People, the Knights of the Brown Bottle, the Auckland Revolutionary Army, The Knights of the Order, the Lindskiis, and the NZ Colonial Brigade.

== Battle locations ==
Battles have taken place in towns and cities all around New Zealand, and at public events such as University Orientation weeks and capping events, folk festivals, local carnivals, wine and food festivals, snow festivals, swimming-pool openings, school gala days, and "Summer City" programs.

== Brief history ==
The 1st Flying Claymores were the first company in the regiment, quickly followed by the 2nd McBormann Fusiliers, both based in Hamilton.

The name was changed to the McGillicuddy Highland Army in 1985, shortly after the Wellington-based 3rd Laird's Own Borderers (established in March 1984) was officially incorporated into the Army, and its members welcomed into the Clan.

The success of the Clan's political wing, the McGillicuddy Serious Party in the 1987 and 1990 NZ General Elections saw a rapid growth in McGHA membership, with new regiments founded in Auckland (The 5th Thane of Gordonton's Own Islemonn), Christchurch (The 6th Jahkirk Highland Tossers), and Dunedin (The Blues and Greys). At its peak in late 1992, the McGHA consisted of some eight uniformed regiments boasting a combined membership of over 100 pacifist warfarers.

== Current status ==
As of 2024, the Clan McGillicuddy has no 'standing' uniformed regiments, although the Army has never been formally demobbed. Many Clan members still answer the Laird's calls to arms, and the Clan will still happily meet in battle any opponents who wish to challenge them. Battles have also occurred regularly every two years as part of the Clan's self-described "Xtreme Picnics'. For example, on December 31, 2007 the Clan McGillicuddy "Martians" took on Alf's Imperial Army in Oamaru in an enactment of the "War of the Worlds".; while in January 2014 and again in 2020 the Clan invaded the small township of Waitati. https://www.odt.co.nz/news/dunedin/video-militia-mayhem-and-madness-waitati https://www.odt.co.nz/news/dunedin/%E2%80%98battle-blueskin%E2%80%99-full-fun

== Sources ==
Largely taken from issues of the Clan McGillicuddy's magazine Th'Noo in particular issue number 10/11. Available in the National Library of New Zealand. ISSN 1170-6333 Hamilton [N.Z.] : Och-a-non Publishing, [1988-
