= Ardfert (Parliament of Ireland constituency) =

Pre-1801 Irish constituency

- Former borough constituency for the Irish House of Commons
- County: County Kerry
- Borough: Ardfert

1639–1801
- Seats: 2
- Replaced by: Disfranchised

Ardfert was a constituency represented in the House of Commons of the Parliament of Ireland until its abolition in 1801 under the Acts of Union 1800.

== Area ==
This constituency was based in the town of Ardfert in County Kerry.

== History ==
Ardfert in County Kerry was enfranchised as a borough constituency, by a charter in 1639 with a Provost, 12 Burgesses and freemen. It had a Corporation, and the electorate consisted of 13 burgesses and 50 freemen. The parliamentary representatives of the borough were elected using the bloc vote for two-member elections and first past the post for single-member by-elections. In the Patriot Parliament of 1689 summoned by King James II, Ardfert was not represented.

It continued to be entitled to send two Members of Parliament to the Irish House of Commons until the Acts of Union merged the Parliament of Ireland into the Parliament of the United Kingdom on 1 January 1801. The constituency was disenfranchised on 31 December 1800.

Thereafter the borough was represented in the House of Commons of the United Kingdom as part of the county constituency of County Kerry.

== Members of Parliament, 1634–1801 ==
Election	First MP	Second MP
1634	David Crosbie	James FitzJames Pierce
1639	David Crosbie	Anthony Stoughton
1661	Thomas Amory	John Carricke
1689	Roger McElligott	Cornelius MacGillicuddy
1692	Christopher Dominick	Andrew Young
1699	Theobald Purcell	Andrew Young
1703	Henry Rose	Andrew Young
1713	Henry Rose	William Crosbie
1735	William Crosbie (Note: Styled as The Honourable from 1758)	William Crosbie
1743	William Crosbie	Edmond Malone
1758	William Crosbie	Maurice Coppinger
1762	Lancelot Crosbie	Maurice Coppinger
1776	Viscount Crosbie	Maurice Coppinger
1781	Edward Gleadowe	Maurice Coppinger
October 1783	John Scott (Note: Also elected for Portarlington in 1783, for which he chose to sit)	Sir Frederick Flood, 1st Bt
1783	John Tydd	Sir Frederick Flood, 1st Bt
1790	Robert Day	Richard Archdall
January 1798	Robert Day	Arthur Wolfe (Note: Also elected for Dublin City in 1798, for which he chose to sit)
1798	Robert Day	Lord Charles FitzGerald
1798	Lorenzo Moore	Lord Charles FitzGerald
February 1800	John Talbot	Lord Charles FitzGerald
September 1800	Matthew Franks (Note: Elected, but never took his seat)	Lord Charles FitzGerald
1801	Disenfranchised	

== Bibliography ==
- O'Hart, John (2007). The Irish and Anglo-Irish Landed Gentry: When Cromwell came to Ireland. Vol. II. Heritage Books. ISBN 978-0-7884-1927-0.
- Johnston-Liik, E. M. (2002). History of the Irish Parliament, 1692–1800, Publisher: Ulster Historical Foundation (28 February 2002), ISBN 1-903688-09-4,
- T. W. Moody, F. X. Martin, F. J. Byrne, A New History of Ireland 1534-1691, Oxford University Press, 1978
- Leigh Rayment's historical List of Members of the Irish House of Commons. Cites: Johnston-Liik, Edith Mary (2002). The History of the Irish Parliament 1692-1800 (6 volumes). Ulster Historical Foundation.
