= John Crosbie, 2nd Earl of Glandore =

Irish politician (1753–1815)

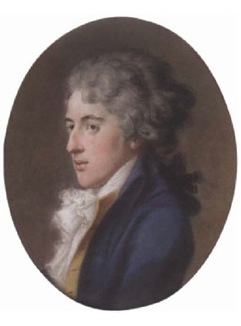
Portrait of John Crosbie, 2nd Earl of Glandore by Hugh Douglas Hamilton

John Crosbie, 2nd Earl of Glandore PC, FRS (25 May 1753 – 23 October 1815), styled Viscount Crosbie between 1777 and 1781, was an Irish politician.

Crosbie was the only surviving son of William Crosbie, 1st Earl of Glandore, by his first wife Lady Theodosia, daughter of John Bligh, 1st Earl of Darnley. He was educated at Trinity College, Dublin. In 1775 he was returned to the Irish House of Commons for Athboy. The following year he was elected for both Tralee and Ardfert. He chose to sit for the latter, and held the seat until 1781, when he succeeded his father in the earldom and entered the Irish House of Lords. He was sworn of the Irish Privy Council in 1785. In 1789, he was appointed Joint Master of the Rolls in Ireland alongside the Earl of Carysfort. They both held the post until 1801. The office was then a sinecure and did not require any legal qualifications. In 1800, he was elected as one of the 28 original Irish representative peers to sit in the House of Lords.

Lord Glandore was married in London in 1771 by Frederick Cornwallis, Archbishop of Canterbury, to the Honourable Diana, daughter of George Germain, 1st Viscount Sackville. The marriage was childless. She died in August 1814, aged 58. Lord Glandore survived her by a year and died in October 1815, aged 62. The earldom and viscountcy of Crosbie became extinct on his death while he was succeeded in the Barony of Brandon by his cousin William Crosbie.

Parliament of Ireland
Preceded by Thomas Bligh; William Tighe	Member of Parliament for Athboy; 1775–1776; With: William Tighe	Succeeded by Edward Tighe; William Chapman
Preceded by Maurice Copinger; Lancelot Crosbie	Member of Parliament for Ardfert; 1776–1781; With: Maurice Copinger	Succeeded by Maurice Copinger; Edward Gleadowe
Legal offices
Preceded by The Duke of Leinster	Master of the Rolls in Ireland; 1789–1801; With: The Earl of Carysfort	Succeeded by Michael Smith
Parliament of the United Kingdom
New title	Representative peer for Ireland; 1800–1815	Succeeded by The Earl of Farnham
Peerage of Ireland
Preceded by William Crosbie	Earl of Glandore; 1781–1815	Extinct
Preceded by William Crosbie	Baron Brandon; 1781–1815	Succeeded by William Crosbie
