= List of Irish MPs 1790–1797 =

This is a list of members of the Irish House of Commons between 2 July 1790 and 11 July 1797. There were 300 MPs at a time in this period.

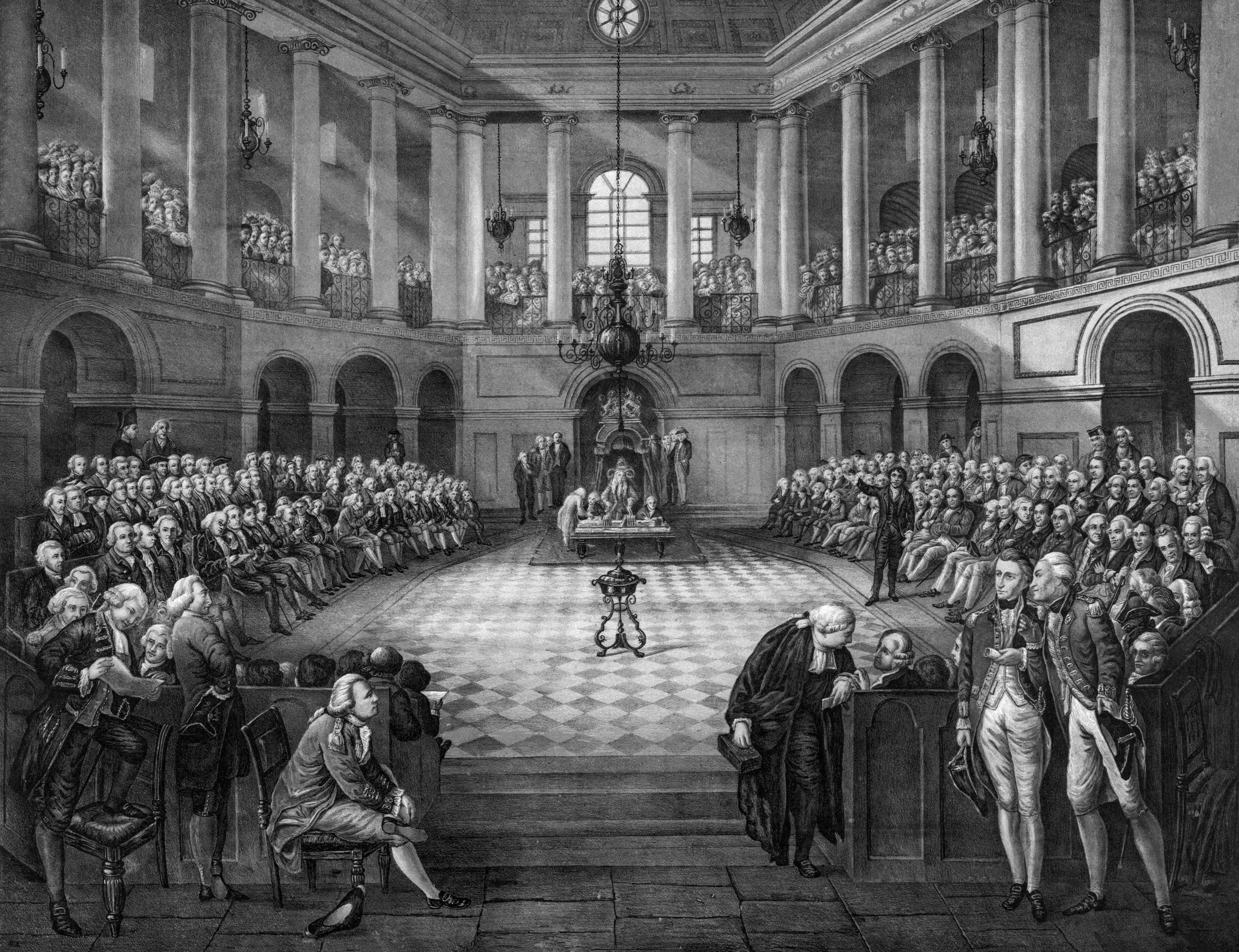
Print of painting of Irish Parliament of 1790.

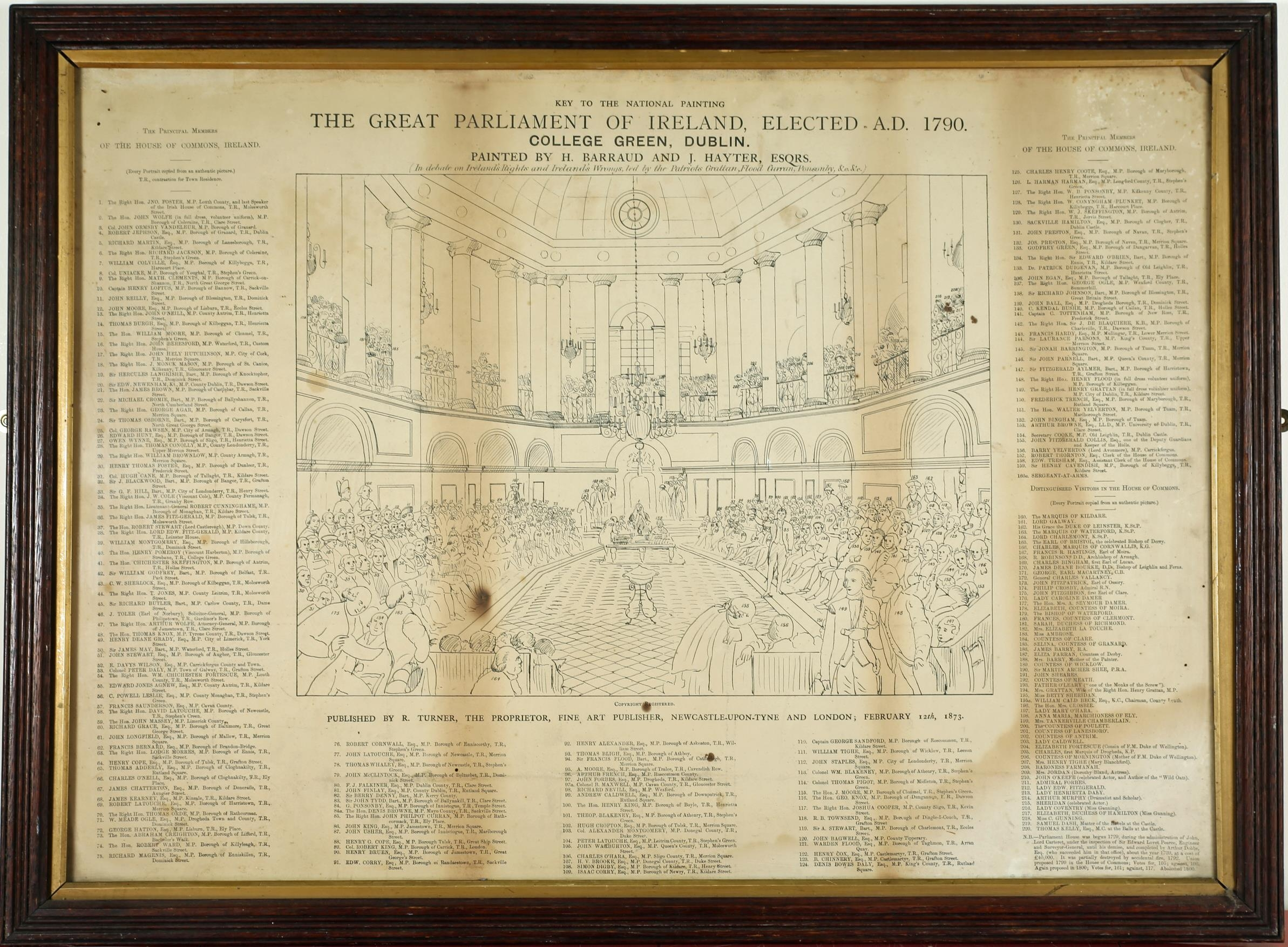
Key to image.

Name	Constituency	Notes
Thomas Adderley	Clonakilty	1790–1791 (died May 1791)
Henry Alcock	Waterford City	
Benjamin Stratford	Baltinglass	
John Stratford	Baltinglass	
John Armstrong	Kilmallock	1790–1791 (died September 1791)
Henry Alexander	Askeaton	
Richard Annesley	Newtownards	
Mervyn Archdall	County Fermanagh	
Richard Archdall	Ardfert	
Sir Fitzgerald Aylmer	Harristown	1790–1794 (died February 1794)
John Bagwell	Doneraile; Tipperary	resigned 1790; 1792–1797
John Ball	Drogheda	1796–1797
Jonah Barrington	Tuam	
Thomas Barton	Fethard (County Tipperary)	
Hon. John Beresford	County Waterford	
Charles Bury	Kilmallock	1792–1797
Humphrey Butler	Donegal	
John Claudius Beresford	Swords	
Marcus Beresford	St Canice	1790–1794 (resigned 1794)
Marcus Beresford	Dungarvan	
James Bernard	County Cork	1790 (died July 1790)
Sir John Blackwood	Bangor	
Joseph Blake	County Galway	
Theophilus Blakeney	Athenry	
William Blakeney	Athenry	
James Blaquiere	Carlingford	
John Blaquiere	Charleville	
Thomas Cherburgh Bligh	Athboy	
Sir James Bond	Naas	
Hugh Boyd	County Antrim	1794–1795 (died November 1795)
Augustus Cavendish-Bradshaw	Carlow	1790–1796
Henry Vaughan Brooke	County Donegal	
Arthur Browne	Dublin University	
Denis Browne	County Mayo	
William Browne	Portarlington	
William Brownlow	County Armagh	
William Brownlow	County Armagh	
Henry Bruen	County Carlow	1790–1795 (died 14 December 1795)
George Bunbury	Thomastown	
Arthur Burdett	Harristown	
George Burdett	Thomastown	
Thomas Burgh	Kilbeggan	
Peter Burrowes	Enniscorthy	
Francis Nathaniel Burton	County Clare	
William Henry Burton	County Carlow	
Charles Kendall Bushe	Callan	1796–1797
Gervase Parker Bushe	Lanesborough	1790–1793 (died August 1793)
Hon. John Wandesford Butler	Kilkenny City; County Kilkenny	1792–1796 (resigned February 1796); 1796 (died April 1796)
Sir Richard Butler	County Carlow	1796–1797
Hugh Cane	Tallow	1790–1793 (died January 1793)
Robert Shapland Carew	Waterford City	
Hugh Carncross	Newtown Limavady	1795–1797
Ephraim Carroll	Bannow	
William Handcock	Athlone	
George Cavendish	St Johnstown (County Longford)	
Sir Henry Cavendish	Lismore; Killybegs	1790–1791 (not duly elected); 1791–1797
Richard Cavendish	Portarlington	
William Tankerville Chamberlain	Clonmines	1791–1793
James Chatterton	Doneraile	
Jonathan Chetwood	Downpatrick	
Thomas Pelham	Clogher	1795–1797; Chief Secretary for Ireland, 1795–1798
Broderick Chinnery	Bandonbridge	
Richard Trench	Newtown Limavady	1796–1797
Henry Theophilus Clements	County Leitrim	1790–1795 (died October 1795)
Nathaniel Clements	Roscommon; Carrick	1790–1791; 1791–1797
Nicholas Coddington	Dunleer	
Thomas Coghlan	Augher	1790–1794 (died February 1794)
Vesey Colclough	Enniscorthy	1790–1794 (died July 1794)
John Cole	County Fermanagh	
Arthur Cole-Hamilton	Enniskillen	
Sir Nicholas Colthurst, Bt	Clonakilty	1792–1795 (died 1795)
Thomas Conolly	County Londonderry	
William Burton Conyngham	Ennis	1790–1796 (died May 1796)
Edward Cooke	Old Leighlin	
Joshua Edward Cooper	County Sligo	
Charles Henry Coote	Maryborough	
Eyre Coote	Ballynakill	
Henry Cope	Tulsk	
Maurice Coppinger	Belturbet	
Robert Cornwall	Enniscorthy	1794–1797
Edward Corry	Randalstown	1794–1797
Isaac Corry	Newry	
Sir James Cotter	Castlemartyr	
Rogerson Cotter	Charleville	
Hon. Henry Wellesley	Trim	1795
Abraham Creighton	Lifford	
Abraham Creighton	Lifford	
Sir Edward Crofton	County Roscommon	
Sir Michael Cromie	Ballyshannon	
William Arthur Crosbie	Trim	1795–1797
William Cuffe	Kilkenny City	1790–1792 (died October 1792)
Robert Cuninghame	Monaghan	1790–1796
John Philpot Curran	Rathcormack	
William Dalrymple	Duleek	1796–1797
Denis Daly	Galway Town	1790–1791 (died October 1791)
Denis Bowes Daly	King's County	
Peter Daly	Galway Town	1792–1797
George Damer (styled Viscount Milton after 1792)	Naas	1795–1797; Chief Secretary for Ireland, 1794–95
Arthur Dawson	Midleton	
Robert Day	Ardfert	
Sir Barry Denny	County Kerry	1790–1794 (died April 1794)
Sir Barry Denny	County Kerry	1794 (died Oct 1794)
Thomas Dickson	Ballyshannon	
Simon Digby	Kildare	1790–1796 (resigned March 1796)
Sylvester Douglas	St Canice	1794–1796; Chief Secretary for Ireland, 1793–94
William Downes, 1st Baron Downes	Donegal	
John Doyle	Mullingar	
James Blackwood	Killyleagh	
Patrick Duigenan	Old Leighlin	1791–1797
George Dunbar	Gowran	
John Dunn	Randalstown	
Henry Duquerry	Armagh; Rathcormack	1790; 1790–1797
John Egan	Tallow	
Charles Eustace	Clonmines	1794–1797
William Elliot	St Canice	1796–1797
John Finlay	County Dublin	1791–1797
William Fletcher	Tralee	1795–1797
Sir John Evans-Freke	Baltimore	
Sir Frederick Falkiner	Athy	
Warden Flood	Taghmon	
Hon. William Forward-Howard	St Johnstown (County Donegal)	
Thomas Skeffington	Dunleer	1793–1797
Sir Thomas Fetherston	County Longford	1796–1797
Lord Charles James FitzGerald	Cavan	
Lord Edward FitzGerald	County Kildare	
Edward FitzGerald	Castlebar	
Lord Henry FitzGerald	Dublin City	
James FitzGerald	Tulsk	
Maurice FitzGerald	County Kerry	1795–1797
Sir Frederick Flood	Carlow	1796–1797
John Forbes	Drogheda	1780–1796 (died 1797)
Thomas James Fortescue	County Louth	1790–1795 (died July 1795)
William Charles Fortescue	County Louth	1796–1797
Hon. John Foster	Dunleer	1790–1792 (died February 1792)
John Foster	County Louth	
Luke Fox	Fethard (County Wexford)	1793–1797
Stephen Francis William Fremantle	Fore	1790–1794 (died September 1794)
Arthur French	County Roscommon	
Daniel Gahan	Fethard (County Tipperary)	
Sir William Gleadowe-Newcomen	County Longford	
Sir William Godfrey	Belfast	1792–1797
Hamilton Gorges	County Meath	1792–1797
Hon. Arthur Acheson	Old Leighlin	1790 (ennobled September 1790)
Richard Grace	Baltimore	
Henry Grattan	Dublin City	
Robert Graydon	Kildare	
Alexander Hamilton	Carrickfergus	
John Stuart Hamilton	Strabane	
Sackville Hamilton	Clogher; Armagh	1790–1795 (resigned); 1796–1797
Henry Pomeroy	Strabane	
Richard Hardinge	Knocktopher	1796–1797
Francis Hardy	Mullingar	
William Hare	Cork City	1796–1797
Caleb Harman	County Longford	1793–1796 (murdered January 1796)
Jones Harrison	Kildare	1796–1797
George Hatton	Lisburn	
Henry Hatton	Fethard (County Wexford)	1793 (died November 1793)
Samuel Hayes	Maryborough	1990–1995 (died November 1795)
Thomas Taylour	County Meath	1794–1795 (ennobled February 1795)
Francis Hely	Dublin University	
Richard Townsend Herbert	Clogher	
Bartholomew Hoare	Dingle	1795–1797
Hon. Christopher Hely	Taghmon	1794–1797
John Hely	Cork City	
Hon. John Hely	Taghmon	1790–1794 (died September 1794)
Joseph Hewitt	Belfast	1790–1791 (died 1794)
Arthur Hill	County Down	ennobled October 1793
George Fitzgerald Hill	Coleraine; Londonderry City	1790–1795; 1795–1797
Hugh Hill	Londonderry City	1790–1795 (died February 1795)
Edward Hoare	Banagher	
Joseph Hoare	Askeaton	
Robert Hobart	Armagh	1790–1797; Chief Secretary for Ireland, 1789–1793
John Hobson	Castlemartyr	1792–1797
Peter Holmes	Kilmallock	
John Cradock	Castlebar	
Hon. Hugh Howard	St Johnstown (County Donegal)	
Hugh Howard	Athboy	
William Hume	County Wicklow	
William Irvine	Ratoath	
George Jackson	Coleraine	1790–1796 (resigned February 1796)
Denham Jephson	Mallow	
Richard Mountney Jephson	Charlemont	1794–1797
Hon. George Jocelyn	Dundalk	
Robert Jocelyn	Dundalk	
Robert Johnson	Hillsborough	
Sir Richard Johnston	Blessington	1790–1795 (died April 1795)
Theophilus Jones	County Leitrim	
Edward Jones-Agnew	County Antrim	1792–1797
Bryan Kavanagh	Kilkenny City	1796–1797
John Keane	Bangor	
James Kearney	Kinsale	
Maurice Keatinge	County Kildare	
David Ker	Blessington	1796–1797
Edward King	Carrick	1790–1794
Henry King	Boyle	
Robert King	County Cork	
Robert Edward King	Jamestown	1796–1797
William Knott	Duleek	resigned 1796
Hon. George Knox	Dungannon	
Hon. John Knox	Dungannon	1790–1794 (resigned 1794)
Hercules Langrishe	Knocktopher	
Robert Langrishe	Knocktopher	1790–1796
David La Touche	Newcastle	
David La Touche	Newcastle	
John La Touche	Newtownards	1790–1796
John La Touche	Newtownards	1796–1797
Robert La Touche	Harristown	1794–1797
Peter La Touche	County Leitrim	1796–1797
Hon. Clotworthy Taylor	Trim; County Meath	1791–1795 (resigned 1795); 1795–1797
Hon. Hercules Rowley	County Antrim	1790–1791 (ennobled 1791)
William Lecky	Londonderry City	
Francis Leigh	Wexford	
Robert Leigh	New Ross	
Charles Powell Leslie	County Monaghan	
Thomas Lighton	Tuam	
John Lloyd	Inistioge	
John Loftus	County Wexford	
Thomas Loftus	Fethard (County Wexford)	1790–1792 (died January 1792)
William Loftus	Fethard (County Wexford)	1796–1797
John Longfield	Philipstown	1795–1797
John Longfield	Mallow	
Mountifort Longfield	Enniscorthy	
Richard Longfield	Cork City	1790–1795 (ennobled 1795)
Gorges Lowther	County Meath	1790–1792 (died February 1792)
Gorges Lowther	Ratoath	
Sir John Macartney	Fore	1793–1797
Richard Magenis	Enniskillen	
Richard Magenis	Fore	1794–1797
Eyre Massey	Swords	
John Massy	County Limerick	
John Monck Mason	St Canice	
Hon. Francis Mathew	County Tipperary; Callan; County Tipperary	1790–1792 (not duly elected); 1796; 1796–1797
John Maxwell	County Cavan	1793–1797
John Maxwell-Barry	Doneraile	1792–1797
Sir James May	County Waterford	
John McClintock	Belturbet	
Francis McNamara	County Clare	
William Meade-Ogle	Drogheda	
William Meeke	Callan	
John Metge	Banagher	
Charles Stanley Monck	Gorey	
Alexander Montgomery	County Donegal	
John Montgomery	County Monaghan	
William Montgomery	Hillsborough	
William Domville Stanley Monk	Coleraine	1795–1797
Crosbie Morgell	Tralee	1790–1794 (suicide November 1794)
Lodge Evans Morres	Bandonbridge; Ennis	1790–1795 (resigned 1795); 1796–1797
Charles Moore	Queen's County	1790–1791 (unseated due to insanity)
John Moore	Clonmel	1792–1797
John Moore	Lisburn	
Stephen Moore	Lanesborough	
Stephen Moore	Clonmel	1790 (ennobled 1790)
William Moore	Clonmel	
Abraham Morris	County Cork	1791–1797
George Sandford	Roscommon	
Henry Sandford	Roscommon	1791–1797
John Bourke	Naas	1790–1794 (ennobled August 1794)
Thomas Nesbitt	Cavan	
Edward Newenham	County Dublin	
Richard Nevill	Wexford	
Hon. George Nugent	Fore	1790–1792 (ennobled September 1792)
John Toler	Gorey	
Sir Edward O'Brien	Ennis	1795–1797
Sir Lucius O'Brien	Ennis	1790–1795 (died January 1795)
Arthur O'Connor	Philipstown	1790–1795 (resigned 1795)
Charles O'Hara	County Sligo	
Charles O'Neill	Clonakilty	1790–1792
John O'Neill	County Antrim	1790–1793
George Ogle	County Wexford	
John Butler	Kilkenny City	1790–1791 (ennobled 1791)
Walter Butler	County Kilkenny	1790–1795 (ennobled December 1795)
Hon. James Wandesford Butler	Kilkenny City; County Kilkenny	1796–1796 (never took seat, resigned May 1796); 1796–1797
Arthur Ormsby	Athy	
Charles Montague Ormsby	Duleek	
Charles Osborne	Carysfort	
Sir Thomas Osborne	Carysfort	
Thomas Pakenham	Kells	
Sir John Parnell	Queen's County	
Richard Pennefather	Cashel	
William Pennefather	Cashel	
John Pomeroy	Trim	1790 (died June 1790)
Chambré Brabazon Ponsonby	Dungarvan	
George Ponsonby	Inistioge	
George Ponsonby	Lismore	1796–1797
John Brabazon Ponsonby	Tallow	1794–1797
William Ponsonby	Bandonbridge	1796–1797
William Brabazon Ponsonby	County Kilkenny	
Thomas Prendergast	Clonakilty	1795–1797
Cromwell Price	Monaghan	1791–1797
Hon. Thomas Knox	County Tyrone	
George Rawson	Armagh	1790–1796
John Reilly	Blessington	
William Richardson	Armagh	
Sir Boyle Roche	Tralee	
John Staunton Rochfort	Coleraine	1796–1797
Clotworthy Rowley	Downpatrick	
Laurence Parsons	County Longford	1790–1792 (ennobled 1792)
Lawrence Parsons	King's County	1791–1797
Sir William Parsons	King's County	1790–1791 (died May 1791)
Edmund Henry Pery	Limerick City	1790–1794 (ennobled July 1794)
John Richardson	Newtown Limavady	1790–1795 (resigned 1795)
Robert Rochfort	County Westmeath	
Robert Ross	Newry	
Hon. Hercules Langford Rowley	County Meath	1790–1794 (died March 1794)
William Rowley	Kinsale	
William Parkinson Ruxton	Ardee	
William Sankey	Philipstown	
Francis Saunderson	County Cavan	
Francis Savage	County Down	1794–1997
Henry Boyle	Clonakilty	1793–1797
Richard Sheridan	Charlemont	1790–1794
William Sherlock	Kilbeggan	
Henry Skeffington	Belfast	
Hon. Chichester Skeffington	Antrim	
William John Skeffington	Antrim	
Michael Smith	Randalstown	1791–1793 (appointed judge 1793)
Sir William Smith	Lanesborough	1794–1797
John Prendergast Smyth	Limerick City	
Sir Skeffington Smyth	Galway Town	
William Smyth	County Westmeath	
Nathaniel Sneyd	Carrick	1794–1797
Sir Richard St George	Athlone	
Edmond Stanley	Augher	
John Staples	Newtown Limavady; County Antrim	1790–1795 (resigned 1795); 1796–1797
Annesley Stewart	Charlemont	
Charles Stewart	County Cavan	1790–1793
James Stewart	County Tyrone	
Sir John Stewart	Augher	1794–1797
John Preston	Navan	
Joseph Preston	Navan	
Robert Taylor	Kells	
Robert Stewart	County Down	
Richard Wogan Talbot	County Dublin	1790–1791 (ruled not duly elected)
John Taylor	St Johnstown (County Longford)	
Thomas Tenison	Boyle	1792–1797
Edward Tighe	Wicklow	
William Tighe	Wicklow	
Daniel Toler	County Tipperary	1790–1796 (died January 1796)
Charles Tottenham	Fethard (County Wexford)	1790–1795 (died September 1795)
Charles Tottenham	New Ross	
Nicholas Loftus Tottenham	Clonmines	
Ponsonby Tottenham	Bannow	
John Townsend	Dingle	
Richard Boyle Townsend	Dingle	1790–1795 (resigned 1795)
William Trench	County Galway	
John Tydd	Ballynakill	
James Cuffe	County Mayo	
James Uniacke	Youghal	
Robert Uniacke	Youghal	
John Ormsby Vandeleur	Carlow	
John Ormsby Vandeleur	Granard	
Thomas Pakenham Vandeleur	Granard	
Charles Vereker	Limerick City	1794–1797
James Verner	Dungannon	1794–1797
Hon. John Vesey	Maryborough	1796–1797
Sir Charles des Voeux	Carlingford	
John Waller	County Limerick	
Henry Beresford	County Londonderry	
Hon. Robert Ward	Killyleagh	
Ezekiel Davys Wilson	Carrickfergus	
John Warburton	Queen's County	1791–1797
Nathaniel Warren	Callan	1790–1796 (died January 1796)
Hon. Arthur Wellesley	Trim	
Patrick Welch	Gowran	
Nicholas Westby	County Wicklow	
Henry Westenra	Monaghan	1796–1797
Arthur Wolfe	Jamestown	
John Wolfe	Killybegs	
John Wolfe	Ardee	
Henry Wood	Jamestown	resigned 1796
Benjamin Blake Woodward	Midleton	
Robert Wynne	Sligo	
Owen Wynne	Sligo	
