= List of Irish MPs 1798–1800 =

This is a list of members of the Irish House of Commons between 9 January 1798 and 31 December 1800. There were 300 MPs at a time in this period.

Name	Constituency	Notes
Henry Alcock	Fethard (County Wexford)	1798–1799 (resigned 1799)
William Congreve Alcock	Waterford City	
Benjamin Stratford	Baltinglass	
John Stratford	Baltinglass	
Robert Aldridge	Carysfort	1799–1800
Henry Alexander	Londonderry City	
Richard Annesley	Blessington	1798–1800
Mervyn Archdall	County Fermanagh	
Richard Archdall	Killybegs	Tory Party
William Henry Armstrong	Wicklow	
Arthur Gore	County Donegal	1800 Tory Party
Frederick Trench	Portarlington	
David Babington	Ballyshannon	
John Bagwell	County Tipperary	
Richard Bagwell	Cashel	1799–1800
William Bagwell	Rathcormack	Tory Party
William Bailey	Augher	
Charles Ball	Clogher	March 1800
John Ball	Drogheda	
Jonah Barrington	Clogher	Irish Patriot Party
John Beresford	County Waterford	
John Beresford	Coleraine	
John Claudius Beresford	Dublin City	Tory Party
Marcus Beresford	Swords	
Hans Blackwood	Killyleagh	1799–1800
Sir John Blackwood	Killyleagh	1798–1799 (died February 1799)
Joseph Blake	County Galway	
Theophilus Blakeney	Athenry	
William Blakeney	Athenry	
John Blaquiere	Newtownards	
Edward Bligh	Athboy	1800
Thomas Cherburgh Bligh	Athboy	
Thomas Borrowes	Longford	1800
Charles Boyle	Charleville	1798–1800
Henry Vaughan Brooke	County Donegal	
Arthur Browne	Dublin University	
Denis Browne	County Mayo	
Sir Stewart Bruce	Lisburn	
George Bunbury	Gowran	1798–1800
George Burdett	Gowran	
Thomas Burgh	Clogher	1798–1800
Thomas Burgh	Fore	1800
Peter Burrowes	Enniscorthy	February 1800 Irish Patriot Party
Francis Nathaniel Burton	County Clare	
William Henry Burton	County Carlow	
Charles Kendal Bushe	Callan	1798–1799
Charles Kendal Bushe	Donegal	1799–1800
Sir Richard Butler	County Carlow	
Du Pré Alexander	Newtownards	
James Cane	Ratoath	
Robert Shapland Carew	Waterford City	
Thomas Casey	Kilmallock	1800
Richard Handcock	Athlone	1800
William Handcock	Athlone	
Robert Stewart, Viscount Castlereagh	County Down	Tory Chief Secretary for Ireland
Francis Caulfeild	County Armagh	1798–1799 (ennobled 1799)
George Cavendish	Cavan	
Sir Henry Cavendish	Lismore	
Thomas Pelham	Armagh	1798–1799 (Chief Secretary for Ireland 1795-3 November 1798)
Broderick Chinnery	Bandonbridge	
Richard Trench	County Galway	1798–1800
John Bingham	Tuam	1798–1799 (ennobled 1800)
Nathaniel Clements	County Leitrim	
Richard Dawson	County Monaghan	
Faithful William Fortescue	Monaghan	1800
William Fortescue	Monaghan	1798–1800
William Charles Fortescue	County Louth	
Charles Cobbe	Swords	1798 (died July 1798)
Henry Coddington	Dunleer	1798–1800
John Cole	County Fermanagh	
Lowry Cole	Enniskillen	
Arthur Cole-Hamilton	Enniskillen	
Henry Parnell	Maryborough	
John Congreve	Belfast	February 1800
Thomas Conolly	County Londonderry	1798–1800
Edward Cooke	Old Leighlin	
Joshua Edward Cooper	County Sligo	
Charles Coote	Queen's County	
Eyre Coote	Maryborough	
Robert Camden Cope	County Armagh	1799–1800
Somerset Lowry	County Tyrone	1798–1800
Isaac Corry	Newry	Chancellor of the Exchequer, 1799-1804
James Cotter	Castlemartyr	
Rogerson Cotter	Charleville	
Abraham Creighton	Lifford	
John Creighton	Lifford	
George Crookshank	Belfast	1798–1800
James Crosbie	County Kerry	
William Arthur Crosbie	Trim	
Robert Crowe	Philipstown	1798–1800
James Cuffe	Tulsk	
John Philpot Curran	Banagher	1800
Sir William Cusack	Donegal	
Denis Bowes Daly	King's County	
St George Daly	Galway Town	
Arthur Dawson	Banagher	
Thomas Dawson	Enniscorthy	June 1800
George Augustus Chichester	Carrickfergus	1798–1799 (ennobled January 1799)
Noah Dalway	Carrickfergus	1799–1800
Henry Verney Lovett Darby	Gowran	1800
John Dennis	Clonmel	1800
Quintin Dick	Dunleer	1780
Francis Dobbs	Charlemont	Anti-Union
James Blackwood	Killyleagh	
Patrick Duigenan	Armagh	
George Dunbar	Thomastown	1798–1800
Edward Dunne	Maryborough	1800–1800
Valentine Quin	Kilmallock	1799–1800
Richard Lovell Edgeworth	St Johnstown (County Longford)	1798–1800
John Egan	Tallow	
William Elliot	St Canice	
Charles Eustace	Fethard (County Wexford)	
Henry Eustace	Clonmines	1800
George Evans-Freke	Baltimore	
Sir John Evans-Freke	Baltimore	
Sir Frederick Falkiner	County Dublin	
Andrew Ferguson	Londonderry City	1798–1800
James Fitzgerald	Kildare	
Sir William Gleadowe-Newcomen	County Longford	
Brydges Henniker	Kildare	
Sir Thomas Lighton	Carlingford	
Richard Magenis	Carlingford	
John Maxwell	County Cavan	1798–1800
John Maxwell	Newtown Limavady	
Thomas Skeffington	Dunleer	
Sir Thomas Fetherston	County Longford	
Charles FitzGerald	Ardfert	
Maurice FitzGerald	County Kerry	
Robert Uniacke Fitzgerald	County Cork	
Chichester Fortescue	Trim	
Chichester Fortescue	Hillsborough	1800
John Foster	County Louth	
Matthew Franks	Ardfert	September 1800
Arthur French	County Roscommon	
Luke Fox	Clonmines	1798–1799 (resigned 1799)
Luke Fox	Mullingar	1799–1800
James Galbraith	Augher	
William Gardiner	Thomastown	1800
William Gore	Carrick	
Hamilton Gorges	County Meath	
Charles Vereker	Limerick City	
Archibald Acheson	County Armagh	
Thomas Gould	Kilbeggan	1800
Henry Deane Grady	Limerick City	
Henry Grattan	Wicklow	1799-1800 Irish Patriot Party
William Gregory	Portarlington	1800
Willian Fulke Greville	Granard	January 1798
Alexander Hamilton	Belfast	1798–1800
Hans Hamilton	County Dublin	
Richard Hardinge	Midleton	1798–1799 (resigned 1799)
Edward Hardman	Drogheda	
Francis Hardy	Mullingar	
Richard Hare	Athy	
William Hare	Athy	
George Hatton	Lisburn	
Francis Hely	Naas	
John Hely	Cork City	
Richard Townsend Herbert	Granard	1800
Sir George Hill	Londonderry City	January 1798
Edward Hoare	Askeaton	
Joseph Hoare	Banagher	1798–1800
John Hobson	Clonakilty	
Peter Holmes	Doneraile	
Sir Francis Hopkins	Kilbeggan	1798–1800
Hugh Howard	Athboy	1798–1800
John Cradock	Midleton	1799
John Cradock	Thomastown	May 1800
William Hume	County Wicklow	1798 (killed October 1798)
William Hoare Hume	County Wicklow	1799–1800
Hon. Hugh Howard	St Johnstown (County Donegal)	
Hon. William Forward-Howard	St Johnstown (County Donegal)	
Vere Hunt	Askeaton	
Henry Irvine	Tulsk	
George Jackson	Randalstown	
George Jackson	County Mayo	
Denham Jephson	Mallow	
George Jocelyn	Dundalk	1798 (died March 1798)
John Jocelyn	Dundalk	
Robert Johnson	Hillsborough	January 1800
William Johnson	Roscommon	1799–1800
Robert Johnston	Philipstown	1800
Theophilus Jones	County Leitrim	
Walter Jones	Coleraine	
Thomas Kavanagh	Kilkenny City	1798–1799
John Keane	Youghal	
James Kearney	Thomastown	1798–1800
Maurice Keatinge	County Kildare	
John Kelly	Lanesborough	1800
Henry Kemmis	Tralee	
Charles King	Belturbet	1798–1800
John King	Clogher	March 1800
George King	County Roscommon	1798–1799
Gilbert King	Jamestown	
Henry King	Boyle	
John King	Jamestown	
William Knott	Taghmon	
Andrew Knox	Strabane	1798–1800
Hon. Charles Knox	Dungannon	1798–1799
Francis Knox	Philipstown	1798–1800
George Knox	Dublin University	
James Knox	Taghmon	
David La Touche	Newcastle	
David La Touche	Newcastle	
John La Touche	County Kildare	
John La Touche	Harristown	
Robert La Touche	Harristown	
Gerard Lake	Armagh	1799–1800
Gustavus Lambart	Kilbeggan	
Clotworthy Rowley	County Meath	1798–1800
Hercules Langrishe	Knocktopher	1798–1800
Edward Lee	Dungarvan	
Francis Leigh	Wexford	
Robert Leigh	New Ross	
John Loftus	County Wexford	
William Loftus	Bannow	1798–1800
Charles Vane	Thomastown	March 1800
Charles Vane	County Londonderry	May 1800
Robert King	Boyle	
Thomas Lindsay	Castlebar	1798–1800 (resigned 1800)
Thomas Lindsay	Castlebar	1798–1800
John Longfield	Ballynakill	
John Longfield	Mallow	
Mountifort Longfield	Cork City	
Henry Luttrell	Clonmines	1799–1800
Joseph Lysaght	Cashel	1798–1799
George Lyttelton	Granard	1798–1800
Sir John Macartney	Naas	1798–1800
Edmund Alexander Macnaghten	County Antrim	
James Mahon	Philipstown	1800
Ross Mahon	Granard	1798–1800
Stephen Mahon	Knocktopher	April 1800
Thomas Mahon	County Roscommon	1799–1800
Richard Martin	Lanesborough	1798–1800
Richard Martin	County Galway	1800
Francis Mathew	County Tipperary	
John Monck Mason	St Canice	
Hon. Henry Skeffington	Antrim	
Hugh Dillon Massy	County Clare	
William Thomas Monsell	Dingle	1798–1800
Montague James Mathew	Ballynakill	1798–1800
James Edward May	Belfast	January 1800
James McClelland	Randalstown	1798–1800
Charles McDonnell	Rathcormack	
Francis McNamara	Killybegs	
John Metge	Tallow	
George Miller	Castlebar	1800
William Domville Stanley Monck	Gorey	1798–1799
Alexander Montgomery	County Donegal	1798–1800
Lodge Morres	Dingle	
Nathaniel Montgomery-Moore	Strabane	
Arthur Moore	Tralee	
John Moore	Newry	1799–1800
Lorenzo Moore	Ardfert	1798–1800
Stephen Moore	Clonmel	
William Moore	St Johnstown (County Longford)	1798–1800
Stephen Moore	Kells	
George Sandford	Roscommon	1798–1799
Henry Sandford	Roscommon	
Daniel Mussenden	Killyleagh	1800
Charles Montague Ormsby	Duleek	
Sir Richard Musgrave	Lismore	
Thomas Nesbitt	Cavan	
Richard Nevill	Wexford	
Thomas Worth Newenham	Clonmel	1798–1800
John Toler	Gorey	
Sir George Nugent	Charleville	1800
Sir Edward O'Brien, 4th Bt	Ennis	
Robert O'Callaghan	Bandonbridge	
Hugh O'Donnell	Donegal	1798–1799
James Moore O'Donnell	Ratoath	
Charles O'Hara	County Sligo	
William Odell	County Limerick	
George Ogle	Dublin City	July 1798, Anti-Union
Charles Silver Oliver	Kilmallock	1798–1799
Silver Oliver	Kilmallock	1798–1799
James Butler	County Kilkenny	
Joseph Mason Ormsby	Gorey	1799–1800
Charles Osborne	Carysfort	
Henry Osborne	Carysfort	1798–1799
Henry Osborne	Enniskillen	1800
Edward Pakenham	Longford	1798–1800
Thomas Pakenham	Longford	
Sir John Parnell	Queen's County	
Richard Pennefather	Cashel	
Thomas Pepper	Kells	1800
William Plunket	Charlemont	
George Ponsonby	Galway Town	
John Ponsonby	Dungarvan	
William Ponsonby	Fethard (County Tipperary)	
William Brabazon Ponsonby	County Kilkenny	
Richard Power	County Waterford	
Thomas Prendergast	Clonakilty	
Joseph Preston	Navan	
Thomas Prior	Bannow	March 1800
Francis Aldborough Prittie	Doneraile	1800
Henry Prittie	Carlow	
Abel Ram	County Wexford	
George Harrison Reade	Fethard (County Wexford)	1799–1800
John Reilly	Blessington	
William Edmond Reilly	Hillsborough	1800
Sir William Richardson	Ballyshannon	
Boyle Roche	Old Leighlin	
Gustavus Home Rochford	County Westmeath	
John Staunton Rochfort	Fore	
Lawrence Parsons	King's County	
Clotworthy Rowley	Downpatrick	
Sir Josias Rowley	Downpatrick	
Samuel Campbell Rowley	Kinsale	
William Rowley	Kinsale	
Robert Rutledge	Duleek	
Charles Ruxton	Ardee	1798–1799 (resigned 1799)
William Ruxton	Ardee	
William Parkinson Ruxton	Ardee	1799–1800
Francis Saunderson	County Cavan	
William Saurin	Blessington	1800
Richard Fortescue Sharkey	Dungannon	1800
Edmond Stanley	Lanesborough	
Francis Savage	County Down	
James Savage	Callan	1799–1800
Henry Boyle	County Cork	
Sir Robert Shaw	Bannow	1799
Sir George Shee	Knocktopher	
Mark Singleton	Carysfort	1800
William John Skeffington	Antrim	
William Smyth	County Westmeath	
Marcus Somerville	County Meath	1800
Nathaniel Sneyd	Carrick	1798–1800
Nathaniel Sneyd	County Cavan	1800
Sir Richard St George	Athlone	1789–1800
Barry Boyle St Leger	Doneraile	1798–1800
Thomas Stannus	Portarlington	1798–1800
John Staples	County Antrim	
Sir Thomas Staples	Knocktopher	March 1800
James Stewart	County Tyrone	
Sir John Stewart	Bangor	
John Straton	Dundalk	1799–1800
Francis Synge	Swords	
John Preston	Navan	
John Talbot	Ardfert	February 1800
William Talbot	Kilkenny City	1798–1800
John Taylor	Fethard (County Tipperary)	
Robert Taylor	Kells	1798–1800
Henry Tighe	Inistioge	
Robert Tighe	Carick	1800
William Tighe	Inistioge	
Charles Tottenham	New Ross	
Ponsonby Tottenham	Clonmines	
Blayney Townley-Balfour	Belturbet	1800
John Townsend	Castlemartyr	
Thomas Townsend	Belturbet	
Charles Trench	Newtown Limavady	
Francis Trench	Ballynakill	1800
Sir John Tydd	Fore	1798–1800
Robert Uniacke	Youghal	
John Ormsby Vandeleur	Ennis	
William Mullins	Dingle	
James Verner	Dungannon	
George Vesey	Tuam	1800
John Waller	County Limerick	
David Walshe	Ballynakill	1800
Robert Ward	Bangor	
Henry Beresford	County Londonderry	
Patrick Welch	Callan	
James Wemys	Kilkenny City	
Nicholas Westby	County Wicklow	
Warner William Westenra	County Monaghan	
Thomas Whaley	Enniscorthy	
Ezekiel Davys Wilson	Carrickfergus	
Arthur Wolfe	Dublin City	1798 (ennobled July 1798)
John Wolfe	Carlow	
Benjamin Blake Woodward	Midleton	
Owen Wynne	Sligo	1798–1800
Robert Wynne	Sligo	1798–1799
William Wynne	Sligo	1799–1800
Walter Aglionby Yelverton	Tuam	
