= List of Irish MPs 1769–1776 =

This is a list of members of the Irish House of Commons between 1769 and 1776. There were 300 MPs at a time in this period.

Name	Constituency	Notes
James Agar	County Kilkenny	
Francis Andrews		
Mervyn Archdall	Fermanagh County	
Beauchamp Bagenal		
Robert Barry		
John Beresford		
Sir John Blackwood		
John Blakeney		
Theophilus Blakeney		
John Blaquiere		Chief Secretary for Ireland, 1772–1776
Sir John Blunden		
Sir Kildare Borrowes		
William Brabazon	County Wicklow	
Edward Brodrick	Midleton	
Sir Arthur Brooke	County Fermanagh	
Arthur Browne	Gowran	
William de Burgh		
Sir Thomas Butler		
James Alexander		
Lord Frederick Campbell		
Hugh Carleton		
Hugh Carleton		
Henry Butler		
Vesey Colclough	County Wexford	
William Trench		
Henry de Burgh		
Nathaniel Clements		
William Fortescue		
Francis Conyngham		
William Conyngham		
Sir Edward Crofton		
John Crosbie		
Denis Daly		
James Daly		
Jocelyn Deane		
Sir Robert Deane	Carysfort	
John Talbot Dillon		
Henry Prittie	Gowran	
John Creighton		
Thomas Eyre		
Riggs Falkiner		
Barry Maxwell		
Maurice FitzGerald		
Richard Fitzgerald	Boyle	
Robert FitzGerald		
Henry Flood		
Thomas Fortescue		
John Foster		
Luke Gardiner		
Arthur Gore		
Henry Grattan		
William Handcock		
Arthur Pomeroy		
Robert Hellen		
John Hely		
Francis Ingram		
Peter Holmes		
Ralph Howard	County Wicklow	
James Jeffreyes	Midleton	
Robert Jephson		
Arthur Jones		
Henry King	Boyle	
Hercules Langrishe		
William FitzGerald		
Robert Clements		
Godfrey Lill	Baltinglass	
Robert Leigh	New Ross	
Henry Loftus	County Wexford	
Arthur Loftus	Fethard (County Wexford)	
Henry Loftus	Clonmines	
Armar Lowry		
Robert Stewart		
Charles Bingham		
Charles Lucas		
William Mayne	Carysfort	
George Macartney		Chief Secretary for Ireland, 1769–1772
Hugh Massy		
John McCausland		
Sir Capel Molyneux	Dublin University	
Alexander Montgomery		
Alexander Montgomery		
George Montgomery		
Robert Deane		
Thomas Knox		
Sir Lucius O'Brien		
George Ogle		
Sir William Osborne		
Sir William Parsons		
Marcus Paterson		
Edmund Pery		
John Pomeroy		
John Ponsonby	County Kilkenny	
William Ponsonby		
Boyle Roche		
Laurence Parsons		
Robert Cuninghame		
John Ruxton		
John Scott	Mullingar	
John Staples		
Sir Richard Steele	Mullingar	
Edward Stratford		
John Stratford	Baltinglass	
Philip Tisdall	Dublin University	
Charles Tottenham	Clonmines	
John Tottenham	Fethard (County Wexford)	
Richard Townsend		
James Cuffe		
Hunt Walsh		
Bernard Ward		
Nicholas Ward		
Barry Yelverton		
