= List of Irish MPs 1661–1666 =

This is a list of members elected to the Irish House of Commons in 1661. The parliament sat until 1666 and consisted of almost 300 MPs at a time during this period.

Name	Constituency	Notes
James Annesley, Lord Annesley	County Waterford	Replace Richard Power who succeeded to a peerage in 1661
Nicholas Bayly	Newry	
Henry Bellingham	County Louth	
Randal Beresford	Coleraine	
Tristram Beresford	County Londonderry	
Sir George Bingham	Castlebar	
Richard Blayney	County Monaghan	
John Blennerhassett	County Kerry	
John Blennerhassett	Tralee	
Sir George Blundell	Philipstown	
Joshua Boyle	Clonakilty	
Murrough Boyle	Kilmallock	
Richard Boyle	County Cork	Died 1665 and replaced by Roger Boyle.
Roger Boyle	County Cork	
Edward Brabazon	County Wicklow	Elected in 1666 to replace Folliott Wingfield
Sir Thomas Bramhall	Dungannon	
Sir Thomas Bramhall	Tuam	Sat for Dungannon
St John Broderick	Kinsale	
Sir Allen Broderick	Dungarvan	
Richard Bulkeley	Baltinglass	
Thomas Burdett	Carlow	
Sir Francis Butler	Old Leighlin	
Lord John Butler	Dublin University	
Stephen Butler	Belturbet	Died and replaced in 1662 by his son Francis Butler
John Campbell	Callan	
Henry Cary	Fore	Elected 1662 to replace Sir Timothy Tyrrill. Died 1663 and was replaced by John Forrest
Thomas Caulfeild	Charlemont	
Sir Arthur Chichester	Dungannon	
Randolph Clayton	Kinsale	
John Cliffe	Taghmon	
Sir John Cole	County Fermanagh	
Sir Michael Cole	Enniskillen	
Sir Robert Cole	Enniskillen	
Dudley Colley	Philipstown	
Robert Colville	Hillsborough	
Edward Cook	Clogher	
Charles Coote	County Roscommon	Replaced 1662 by George Lane, 1st Viscount Lanesborough.
Sir Peter Courthorpe	Cork City	
John Craige	Strabane	
Edward Crofton	Lanesborough	
Vere Essex Cromwell	County Down	
James Cuffe	County Mayo	
Sir Thomas Dancer	New Ross	
Henry Davys	Belfast	
Hercules Davys	Carrickfergus	
John Davys	County Antrim	
Sir Paul Davys	County Kildare	
Sir William Davys	Dublin City	
William Davys	County Fermanagh	Died and replaced 1662 by Henry Blennerhassett
Arthur Denny	County Kerry	
Edward Dering	Lisburn	
Carey Dillon	Banagher	
William Domville	Antrim	Elected when the constituency was created in 1665
Sir William Domville	County Dublin	Attorney-General for Ireland
Matthew Draper	Clogher	
Sir John Edgeworth	St Johnstown (Co Longford)	
Sir Maurice Eustace jnr	Knocktopher	
Sir Maurice Fenton	Fethard (County Tipperary)	
Gerald Fitzgerald	Limerick City	
John FitzGerald	Dungarvan	
Robert Fitzgerald	County Kildare	
Sir William Flower	St Canice	
Sir Arthur Forbes	County Tyrone	Also elected for Mullingar
Sir Robert Forth	County Meath	
Arthur Freke	Clonakilty	
Richard Gethin	Newtown Limavady	
Sir Thomas Gifford	Trim	
John Gilbert	Maryborough	
Sir Arthur Gore	County Mayo	
Sir William Gore	Banagher	
Robert Gorges	Bandonbridge	
Isaac Granier	Ennis	
Charles Hamilton	County Donegal	
Sir Francis Hamilton	County Cavan	
Hans Hamilton	County Armagh	
William Handcock	County Westmeath	
Sir Standish Hartstonge	Limerick City	
Francis Harvey	Clonmines	
Arthur Hill	County Down	
Moyses Hill	Drogheda	
Henry Howard	Tallow	By-election May 1661
Sir Henry Ingoldsby	County Clare	
John Jeffreys	Antrim	Elected when the constituency was created in 1665
Robert Johnston	Lisburn	Elected 1665 in place of Sir Edward Smith
Oliver Jones	Knocktopher	
Oliver Jones	County Roscommon	
Sir Theophilus Jones	County Meath	
Thomas Keating	Ballynakill	
Sir Robert King	Ballyshannon	
Sir William King	County Limerick	
William Knight	Belfast	
Sir Richard Kyrle	Cork City	
George Lane	County Roscommon	
Sir Richard Lane, 1st Baronet	Tuam	Elected 1665 to replace Robert Ormesby
Dr Dudley Loftus	Bannow	
Nicholas Loftus	Fethard (County Wexford)	
John Lyndon	Killybegs	
Boyle Maynard	Youghal	
Amos Meredith	Ballynakill	
Charles Meredyth	Old Leighlin	
Sir Audley Mervyn	County Tyrone	Speaker and Prime Serjeant
Henry Mervyn	Augher	
Sir Hugh Middleton	Castlebar	Replaced William Rowse, who had been absent without leave
Martin Noel	Wexford	
Henry O'Brien, Lord Ibrackan	County Clare	
Robert Oliver	County Limerick	
Sir Richard Osborne	County Waterford	
Richard Palfrey	Augher	
Sir John Perceval	County Cork	Died 1665 and was replaced by John St Leger.
William Petty	Inistioge	
Henry Piers	St Johnstown (Co Longford)	
Alexander Pigott	Maryborough	
John Ponsonby	County Kilkenny	
Thomas Pooley	Mallow	
John Povey	Swords	
Richard Power	County Waterford	Succeeded to peerage 1661 and replaced by James, Lord Annesley
John Preston	Navan	
Sir Nicholas Purdon	Baltimore	
William Purefoy	Ennis	
John Read	Bandonbridge	
Sir George Rawdon	Carlingford	
Robert Reading	Ratoath	Elected 1662 to replace Richard Boughton
Sir Richard Reynell	Athboy	
Edward Richardson	County Armagh	
Sir Oliver St George	County Galway	
Sir Heywood St Leger	Mallow	
Launcelot Sandes	Dingle	
Sir James Shaen	Clonmel	
Robert Shapcote	Wicklow	
Robert Shapcote	Thomastown	Sat for Wicklow
Sir John Skeffington	County Antrim	
Owen Silver	Youghal	
Boyle Smith	Tallow	Elected April 1661. Died May 1661.
Edward Smith	Lisburn	Resigned in 1665 on appointment as Chief Justice of the Court of Common Pleas (Ireland)
Erasmus Smith	Ardee	Replaced John Ruxton, who had been expelled
Richard Southwell	Askeaton	
Sir Thomas Stanley	County Louth	
Alexander Staples	Strabane	Expelled and replaced 1665 by Sir Peter Harvey
Richard Stephens	Ardee	Replaced John Chambers, who had been expelled
Archibald Stewart	Tallow	By-election May 1661
John Temple	Carlow	Solicitor-General for Ireland. Acted as Speaker, 1661–62, while the previous Speaker, Sir Audley Mervyn was in London.
Sir John Temple	County Carlow	
Sir William Temple	County Carlow	
Sir Henry Tichborne	Sligo	
Richard Townsend	Baltimore	
Marcus Trevor	County Down	Ennobled 1662 and replaced by Vere Essex Cromwell
Sir Henry Tynte	County Cork	Died 1661 and replaced by Sir John Perceval, 1st Baronet.
Arthur Upton	Carrickfergus	
Nicholas Ward	Downpatrick	
Sir James Ware	Dublin University	
John Weaver	King's County	
William Weldon	Athy	
Oliver Wheeler	St Canice	
Folliott Wingfield	Tallow	April 1661 - sat for County Wicklow
Folliott Wingfield	County Wicklow	Created Viscount Powerscourt in 1665
