= Clonmines =

Civil parish in County Wexford, Ireland

Coordinates: 52.261013°N 6.765701°W

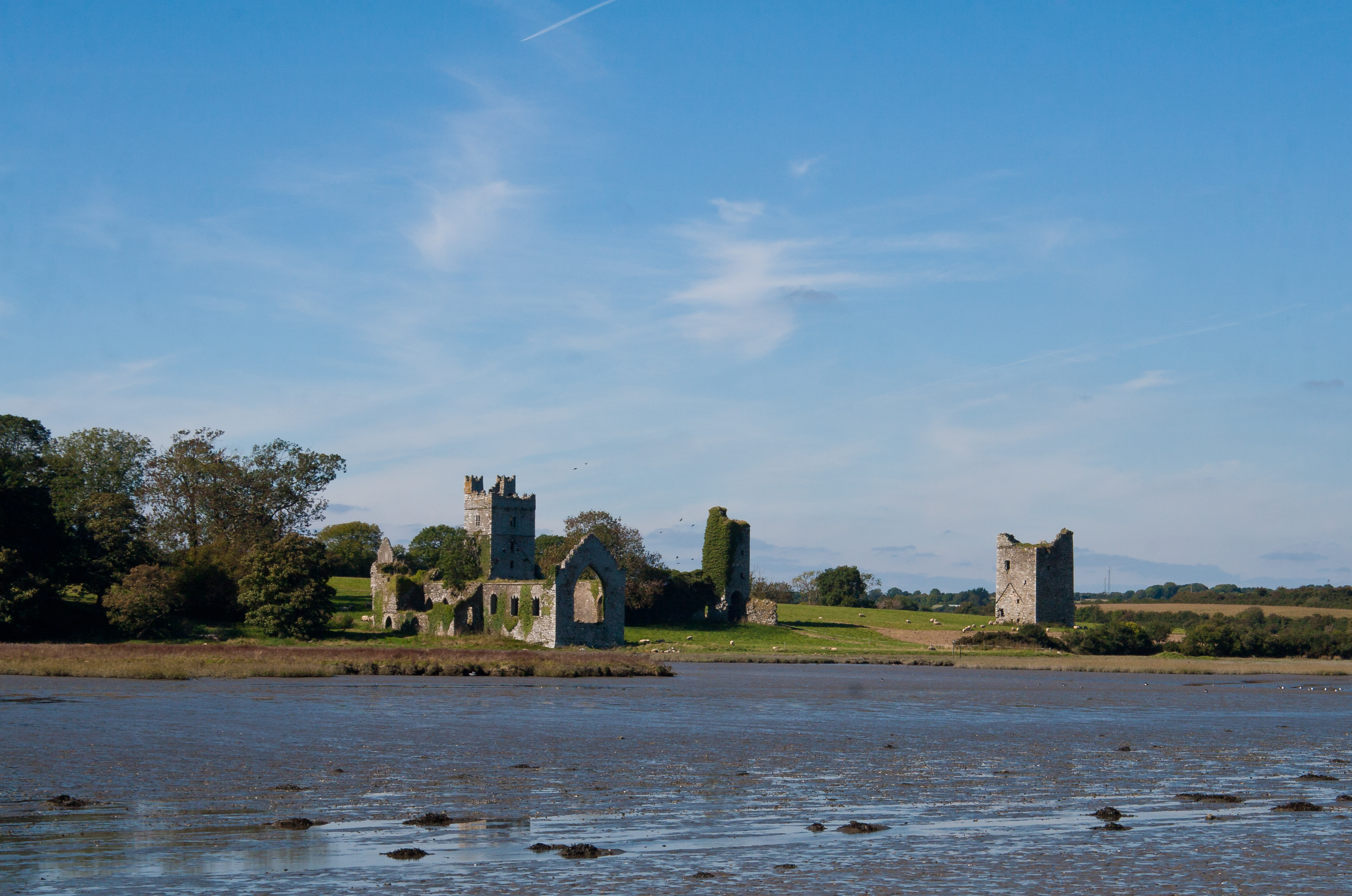
Ruins of the medieval Clonmines town as seen from Bannow bay

Clonmines is a civil parish and townland in the Bannow Bay area of County Wexford, Ireland, the site of "the finest example in Ireland of a deserted medieval borough". It is situated in the barony of Shelburne, southwest of Wellingtonbridge on the northwest shore of Bannow Bay. The parish of Clonmines contains the townland of the same name and the smaller townland of Arklow, with respective areas of 1,258 acres (509 ha) and 127 acres (51 ha).

== History ==
There is evidence of a Norse-Gaelic settlement in Bannow in general and Clonmines in particular. In the early thirteenth century, after the Norman conquest of Ireland, a borough and port was established at Clonmines by William Marshal. Colfer suggests that Marshal chose the site in spite of its shallow harbour and poor hinterland, to offer a sheltered winter port alternative to New Ross. After the partition of Marshal's Lordship of Leinster around 1249, Clonmines was a detached manor of the liberty of Kildare.

It was a notable town with a provost and bailiff in the fourteenth century, and still considered a town in the sixteenth. In 1552, King Edward VI funded a scheme to mine silver in nearby Barrystown, which was abandoned after five months. The name "Clonmines" predates these mines; its origin is uncertain. Herbert F. Hore in 1859 suggested the Irish Cluainmain "Ecclesiastical retreat on the plains".

Patrick Weston Joyce in 1913 suggested Cluain-mín, meaning "smooth meadow". T. C. Butler in 1986 suggested Cloch-Maighean, "a stone enclosure around the dwelling of a chief".

Colfer suggests that Clonmines's isolation from the rest of Kildare, and competition from New Ross, contributed to its decline. Sandbars had rendered the port unnavigable by the 17th century. The site was subsequently deserted, and no record exists of any charter. Although Clonmines remains a civil parish, in 1785 the Church of Ireland parish was united by Walter Cope, Bishop of Ferns and Leighlin, with those of Tintern and Owenduff to form the Union of Owen Duff.

== Borough ==
Clonmines Borough was a rotten borough represented in the Irish House of Commons, which shared the same burgesses as nearby Bannow and Fethard. It was disfranchised in 1801 when under the Act of Union 1800 with £15,000 compensation paid to the Marquess of Ely in compensation in respect of each of these. A report into boroughs in Ireland in 1833 found "there is no house at or near the place, except Mr Sutton's ... the population of what was once the borough [consisted] of merely the family of this gentleman".

== Ruins ==
A 1684 account describes the ruins of a church, an abbey, and "4 or 5 ruined Castles"; in the nineteenth century, "the seven castles of Clonmines" were still proverbial, although only some still had visible remains. Colfer in 2004 characterised the remains as two tower houses, one incorporated into a more modern dwelling; a fortified seventeenth-century house; the parish church of Saint Nicholas; another fortified church; and the Augustinian priory. The poorer people's buildings of wood and clay have disappeared. Excavations have revealed traces of the medieval defensive ramparts. The site is private property and not open to the public.

== Sources ==
- Colfer, Billy (2004). The Hook Peninsula: County Wexford. Cork University Press. ISBN 9781859183786.
