= Charles Tottenham (1743–1823) =

Irish Member of Parliament

Charles Tottenham (19 April 1743 – 11 June 1823) was an Irish Member of Parliament.

== Biography ==
Tottenham sat in the Irish House of Commons for New Ross from 1768 until 1 December 1800, when he resigned to allow Robert Leigh to become the sole member for New Ross in the new Parliament of the United Kingdom.

He was son of Charles Tottenham, father of Charles Tottenham, grandfather of Charles Tottenham, brother of Nicholas Loftus Tottenham and Ponsonby Tottenham, grandson of Charles Tottenham and Nicholas Loftus, 1st Viscount Loftus, nephew of Sir John Tottenham, 1st Baronet, Nicholas Loftus-Hume, 1st Earl of Ely and Henry Loftus, 1st Earl of Ely, and first cousin of Nicholas Loftus-Hume, 2nd Earl of Ely and Charles Loftus, 1st Marquess of Ely.

Parliament of Ireland
Preceded by Robert Leigh; Charles Tottenham	Member of Parliament for New Ross; 1768 – 1800; With: Robert Leigh	Constituency abolished by Act of Union. See New Ross Westminster constituency
