= Robert Hellen =

Irish politician and judge

Robert Hellen (born 1725, died 1793 in Donnybrook, Dublin) was an Irish politician, Solicitor-General, and judge of the Court of Common Pleas (Ireland).

== Early life ==
He was born at Whitehaven, Cumberland, son of Robert Hellen senior. His family moved to Dublin where he was educated at Trinity College Dublin, taking his degree of Bachelor of Arts in 1746 and Bachelor of Laws in 1749. He entered Middle Temple in 1749 and was called to the Irish bar in 1755. He became King's Counsel in 1774.

== Career ==
He became the Member of Parliament for Bannow in 1768 and Fethard (County Wexford) in 1776. He was appointed as Solicitor-General in 1777, and a judge of the Court of Common Pleas in 1779.

== Family ==
He married Dorothea Daniel of Dublin in 1761; Dorothea was wealthy but it may have been a love marriage since she was also noted for beauty and charm. They had four daughters.

== Character ==
When young he was described rather sentimentally as "a youth of fair fame and gentle endowments". In later life he was noted for his literary tastes: he enjoyed the company of poets and writers like Charlotte Brooke, and built up an impressive library and picture collection. He was considered a poor politician, but a learned judge.

Parliament of Ireland
Preceded by Henry Mitchell; Henry Loftus	Member of Parliament for Bannow; 1768–1776; With: Charles Tottenham	Succeeded by Henry Loftus; Nicholas Loftus Tottenham
Preceded by John Tottenham; Arthur Loftus	Member of Parliament for Fethard (County Wexford); 1776–1779; With: Charles Loftus	Succeeded by Charles Loftus; Ponsonby Tottenham
Legal offices
Preceded by John Scott	Solicitor-General for Ireland; 1777–1779	Succeeded by Hugh Carleton
