= Arthur Loftus (politician, died 1781) =

Irish Member of Parliament

Major Arthur Loftus (1724 - 1781) of Dorset Street, Dublin was an Anglo-Irish Member of Parliament in the Irish House of Commons from 1768 until his death in 1781. Before this, Loftus had previously served in the British Army for 26 years in North America. During this time, he led a failed expedition up the Mississippi River, an incident which was often mentioned during his political career.

== Early life ==
Arthur Loftus was born in Ireland as the second of three sons to Simon and Hannah Loftus (née Johnson). His father had been recently transferred back to Ireland, having served as a captain in Colonel Harrison's Regiment in the Battles of Malplaquet and Glen Shiel. Loftus is thought to have grown up in a military-style household in the parish of Clara alongside his brothers and sister. The brothers were all 1 year apart from one another, and all three eventually joined the military. Loftus's older brother, Ensign Dudley Loftus, joined their father's regiment in 1739, just before it was deployed to the Caribbean. Dudley Loftus was killed during the assault on Fort San Lazar in 1741, and his father died almost a year later, (Note: by then promoted to lieutenant colonel) partly from injuries sustained in the same battle and partly from disease contracted at sea off Jamaica. Loftus was granted a commission in the British Army as an ensign in the same regiment as his father weeks before his father's death.

== Military career ==
A month after Loftus joined Colonel Harrison's Regiment of Foot, he was promoted to lieutenant, likely as part of the Irish establishment. (Note: The Army Lists do not disambiguate officer names. Arthur Loftus had a cousin with the same name who was commissioned in the British Army over the same period with similar rank progression but who served in a different regiment) The regiment returned from the Caribbean in 1742, replenishing its losses in England before transferring to Ostend in 1745 to support British troops garrisoned there against the French. The regiment returned in the same year once Jacobite forces began an incursion into England. For the next four years, Loftus participated in expeditionary assaults on Brittany until 1748 following a peace treaty signed in Aix-la-Chapelle, which led the regiment to transfer back to Ireland.

Loftus was promoted to Captain in 1754 and was shortly thereafter transferred to the English establishment to participate in renewed assaults on the French. In early 1758, he transferred to Halifax in North America, serving under General Lawrence at the Siege of Louisbourg. (Note: Canon (1854) indicates that a detachment of the 15th Regiment of Foot was sent to America as early as 1755, but it is probably more likely that Arthur joined the main transfer to North America early in 1758) Loftus remained at Louisbourg after the siege and, in the summer of 1759, joined General Wolfe at the assault on Quebec, where the British faced a much larger force of French troops under the command of the Marquis de Montcalm. Wolfe's forces tried repeatedly to break the French entrenchments over three months, culminating in the final battle, which lasted just one hour on the 13th of September. Loftus was deployed on the left flank under General Townshend and was wounded in the same battle that saw the deaths of both Wolfe and Montcalm. Two months later, Loftus was stationed in Boston, where he remained until at least the summer of 1760. (Note: Arthur is thought to have met and married Bostonian Dorothea Wetherhead during this interval)

Having served in his father's regiment for twenty years, Loftus transferred to the 22nd Regiment of Foot in October 1760, and was promoted to the rank of Major. The regiment took part in the capture of Martinique and the Siege of Havana in 1762, where Loftus was commended for his leadership of a force of six hundred and two rank and file. The regiment moved in 1763 to West Florida, which at the time encompassed all territory between the Mississippi and Apalachicola Rivers with its capital at Pensacola, which is where Loftus was stationed.

=== Loftus Heights ===
In 1763, Britain signed a peace treaty with France, ending the seven years' French and Indian War. All French Illinois country east of the Mississippi were ceded to British control, an area so vast that “England found herself in possession of more territory at the close of the French and Indian war than her king and ministry could well govern”. (Note: the French were bound by the treaty to assist the British in taking control of their former territories) The first expeditionary force to exert control over the territory was assigned to Loftus, who was charged with taking possession of the fortress of Chartres, the administrative centre for the region. The plan had been conceived by Colonel Robertson and involved mounting a waterborne expedition to travel the nine-hundred-mile stretch of the Mississippi from New Orleans and taking possession of Fort Chartres, a journey that was expected to take two to four months, assuming the full cooperation of the French.

Colonel Robertson had arranged for boats and equipment to be procured in New Orleans but had been unable to recruit a guide for expedition. As early as January 1764, Loftus arrived at Mobile with a detachment of three hundred and fifty-one men and arrived in New Orleans in early February. Despite Loftus applying severe discipline amongst his men, the French Governor reported twenty desertions before the expedition had started. (Note: the Governor went on to suggest that the men were concerned about the difficulty of the passage as well as their fear of the Indian and correctly predicted more desertions along the route – there were in total 67 to 80 desertions, a quarter of its original strength) Loftus picked up the boats and provisions and set off heavily laden on February the 27th. The Mississippi river was in full flow, creating strong currents, which, when combined with adverse winds, made progress both laborious and slow. Disease began to take hold, resulting in one death and frequent desertions. After three weeks and two hundred and forty miles, the flotilla was attacked by Tonica Indians at Roche Davion. Loftus abandoned the expedition, having lost around a quarter of his men, mostly through desertions. (Note: many of the deserters were caught and were immediately tried and executed)

Back in Mobile, Loftus accused the French of colluding with the Indians to maintain lucrative trade between New Orleans and the Illinois, but nothing was ever proven, despite the welcome accorded by the French when the same chiefs who were involved in the ambush on Loftus entered New Orleans shortly after. (Note: Equally, accusations were made that the expedition was poorly prepared, failing to send advance parties with gifts for the Indians in the absence of a guide) The failure of the expedition arguably encouraged the Indians to resist British rule, resulting in Pontiac’s War. To some extent, the responsibility for failure fell back on Loftus and Roche Davion. The area Loftus and his men were ambushed in became known as Loftus Heights. General Gage indicated that insufficient care had been exercised to ensure success and that a second attempt would succeed if Loftus exercised "necessary precautions". In 1765, new evidence did emerge in support of Loftus's claims, but he was never given the opportunity to mount a second attempt, as the regiment was withdrawn from West Florida in 1765 and returned to England.

== Political career ==
Loftus spent the next two years with his regiment "employed at various stations" around England. It was during this period that he re-established his domicile in Ireland, travelling there with his brother Henry on multiple occasions from England. In 1768, Loftus resigned his commission in the Army and relocated to Ireland at the same time that his former commander at the Battle of the Plains of Abraham, George Townshend, was appointed Lord Lieutenant of Ireland. Weeks later, Loftus was elected to the Irish Parliament for Fethard (Wexford), a borough seat in the pocket of his distant undertaker cousin, the Honourable Henry Loftus. Loftus served as a Member of Parliament for the boroughs of Fethard from 1768 to 1775 and Clonmines from 1776 until his death in 1781. Both boroughs were controlled by his cousin, who commanded up to ten seats in the Irish House of Commons, constituting a powerful voting bloc known as the Loftus Squadron.

Loftus was said to have been a "worthy man" and a good attender of Parliament but, at the age of forty-six, was reportedly already infirm. He voted against the "Popery Bill" in 1774 and again in 1778 after it had been returned from the English Parliament. By 1774, his attendance at Parliament became intermittent and he was granted an annual pension. Despite his infirmity, Loftus was again returned to Parliament for the Loftus Squadron in 1776 and was rewarded the office of the collector of taxes for Dundalk. Loftus supported the Government for the rest of his life, voting against Modification of Poyning's Law.

Loftus died at his house in Dorset Street, leaving his wife, Dorothy, and a daughter.

== Notes and references ==
=== References ===
Parliament of Ireland
Preceded by Hon. Nicholas Loftus	Fethard (Wexford); 1768 – 1775; With: Sir John Tottenham	Succeeded by Charles Tottenham
Preceded by Henry Loftus	Member of Parliament for Clonmines; 1776 – 1781; With: Charles Tottenham	Succeeded by Thomas Loftus (1750 - 1792)
