= John Tottenham =

John Tottenham may refer to:

- John Tottenham, 9th Marquess of Ely, Canadian-British peer
- Sir John Tottenham, 1st Baronet, Anglo-Irish politician
