= Ephraim Carroll =

Irish politician (1753–1824)

Ephraim Carroll (1753–1824) was an Irish politician.

Carroll was born in Dublin and educated at Trinity College, Dublin.

Carroll represented Fethard in the Irish House of Commons between 1783 and 1790, before sitting for Bannow from 1790 to 1799.

Parliament of Ireland
Preceded by Charles Tottenham; Ponsonby Tottenham	Member of Parliament for Fethard; 1783–1790; With: Ponsonby Tottenham	Succeeded by Charles Tottenham; Thomas Loftus
Preceded by Henry Loftus; Nicholas Loftus Tottenham	Member of Parliament for Bannow; 1790–1799; With: Ponsonby Tottenham (1790–1798); William Loftus (1798–1799)	Succeeded by William Loftus; Robert Shaw
