= James Porter (Jacobite) =

Irish Jacobite politician

Colonel James Porter (fl.1686–1701) was an Irish politician and supporter of the Catholic King James II.

He was a Groom of the Bedchamber to King James II in 1686. He was elected a Member of Parliament for Fethard, County Wexford in the 1689 Patriot Parliament of Ireland summoned by the King. During the Williamite War in Ireland, he was a major, and then a lieutenant colonel, in Fitz-James's Regiment of Infantry.

In 1689 was sent to Château de Saint-Germain-en-Laye in France by James and was soon dispatched on fruitless diplomatic missions to seek support from the French King Louis XIV and the Pope. He remained at the Jacobite court in France after James had left Ireland in 1690, and he was attainted by the Williamites in 1691. In 1701, he made Vice-Chamberlain of the Household in France in the exiled court of James Francis Edward Stuart, the Stuart claimant to the throne.

Parliament of Ireland
Preceded by Nicholas Loftus; Sir Nicholas Loftus	Member of Parliament for Fethard, County Wexford; 1689; With: Nicholas Stafford	Succeeded by Sir Richard Bulkeley, Bt; Dudley Loftus
