= William Loftus (British Army officer) =

British general and politician

General William Loftus
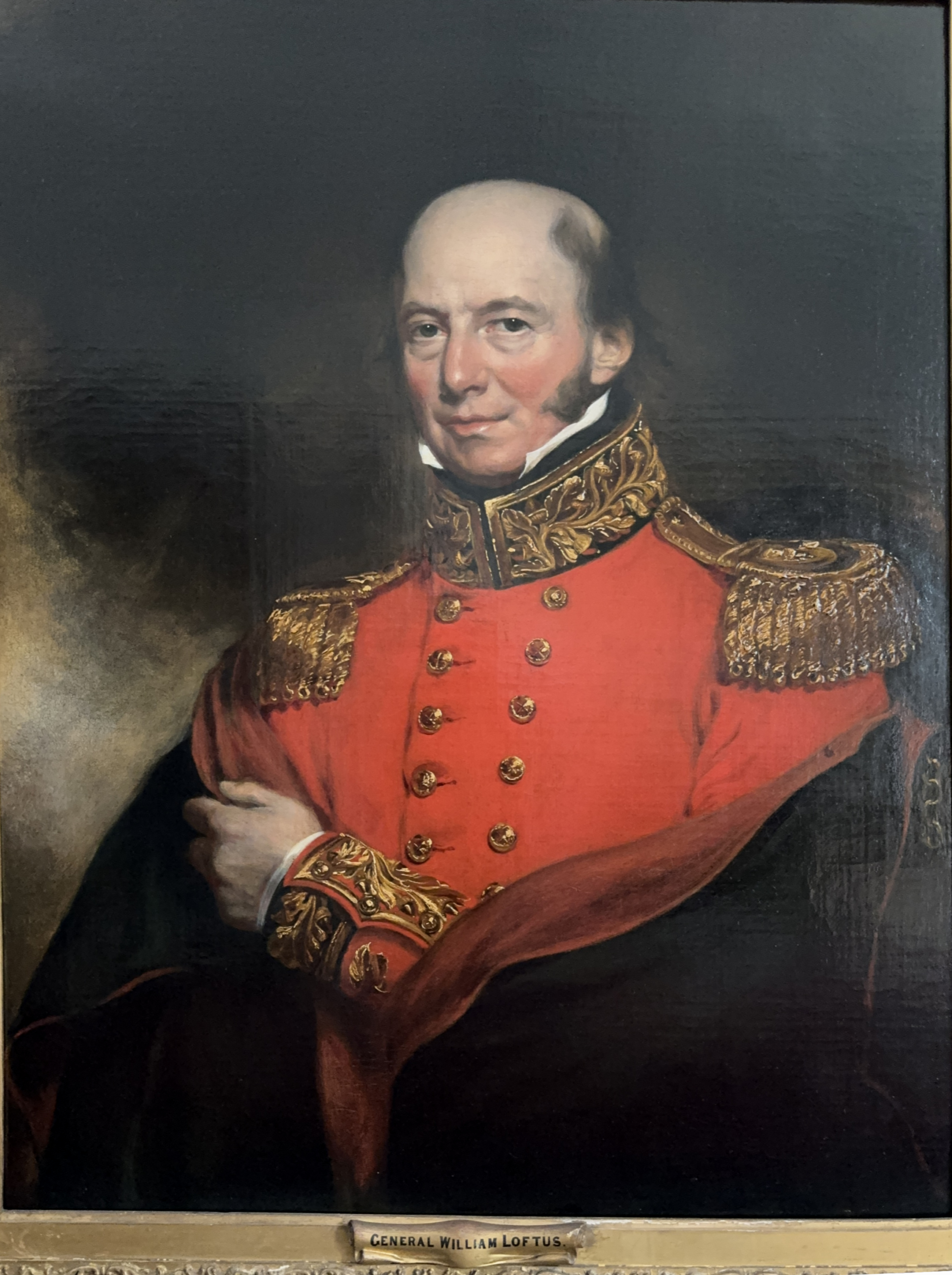
- Portrait by Samuel Lane, c. 1804
- Born: 1751
- Died: 15 July 1831 (aged 79–80)
- Military career
- Allegiance: United Kingdom
- Branch: British Army
- Rank: General
- Conflicts: American War of Independence: Battle of Bunker Hill; New York and New Jersey campaign; Battle of Long Island; Landing at Kip's Bay; Battle of Pell's Point; Battle of White Plains; Battle of Fort Washington; Irish Rebellion of 1798: Battle of Vinegar Hill

General William Loftus (1751 – 15 July 1831) was a British Army officer and Member of Parliament.

== Early life and career ==
Loftus was born at Raynham Hall in Norfolk in 1751, and was later christened at St. Patrick's Cathedral in Dublin where his ancestor Archbishop Adam Loftus is buried. Loftus was the second son of Captain Henry Loftus, by his wife Diana, daughter of William Bullock of Sturston Hall in Norfolk. When Loftus was eighteen, his father purchased a commission for him in Ireland in the 17th Regiment of (Light) Dragoons, which was deployed to North America in 1775, where he saw action in the American War of Independence before returning to Ireland almost three years later.

Loftus was promoted to major-general in 1796, lieutenant-general in 1803 and full general in 1813. He served as Governor of Dumbarton Castle from 1807 to 1810 and as Lieutenant of the Tower of London from 1810, and from 1821, Colonel of the 2nd Dragoon Guards (Queen's Bays) until his death.

Loftus died peacefully at his house in Wimpole Street on 15 July 1831 and was buried eight days later alongside his second wife Lady Elizabeth Loftus in the Townshend family vault at Raynham Hall.

== Role in the American War of Independence ==
Loftus embarked for Boston from Cork on 10 April 1775 and arrived at a city under siege by local militia on 24 May. Three weeks later, Loftus, a cavalry Cornet, volunteered to dismount for his first military action at Bunker Hill overlooking the city, under the command of General Sir William Howe, who on this occasion, was pleased to give him the rank of Lieutenant. The shock of one of the bloodiest battles of the war was followed by long winter months under siege in Boston, which ended in an ignominious evacuation in March 1776. Loftus was seconded as an assistant engineer building fortifications in Halifax, Nova Scotia for the next few months (ibid.).

In July 1776, Loftus landed with his regiment on Staten Island, where the 17th joined forces with the newly recruited Hessian troops. He distinguished himself with great gallantry in his first command on the Bedford Road under Sir William Erskine, personally commended by General Howe for his part in driving back the Americans and capturing General Sullivan, together with two Brigadier-Generals and ten field officers (ibid). A few weeks later at Kip's Bay, Loftus was presented with the opportunity to change the course of history when he saw General Washington virtually unguarded and galloped to:

"...within a hundred yards of that General George Washington, whom he nearly captured. The men whom he had with him were all knocked out of their saddles by the American riflemen concealed behind a fence. Had he been fortunate enough to take such a prize, probably the whole course of events would have changed."

This account may well be apocryphal but it matches what is now known about a moment of fury on that day, 15 September 1776, when Washington briefly lowered his guard. A few weeks later, Loftus had the honour of being selected with twenty picked light dragoons, as General Howe's personal guard at Pelham Manor. At White Plains, Howe chose him to lead the Hessian Grenadiers across the Bronx River, where he was wounded. His wounds were not critical and he was back in the field the following month, when he joined Lord Percy's brigade at the Battle of Fort Washington. His regiment was unable to provide any hope for further promotion, so Loftus transferred to a company in the 44th regiment and was ordered by General Knyphausen to defend a pass at Kingsbridge with one hundred men. The pass was defended, finally pushing the militia back in Kingsbridge in what was one of the heaviest defeats for the Americans in that war but Loftus was once again wounded, and withdrew to winter quarters, missing the action at The Battle of Trenton. Loftus returned to active duty with Colonel Bird up the Hudson River to Peck's Hill in January 1777, where they blew up the American ammunitions stores. This was followed by a number of actions in New Jersey in 1777. Loftus was promoted to captain and returned to Ireland as aide-de-camp to the Lord Lieutenants of Ireland at Dublin Castle.

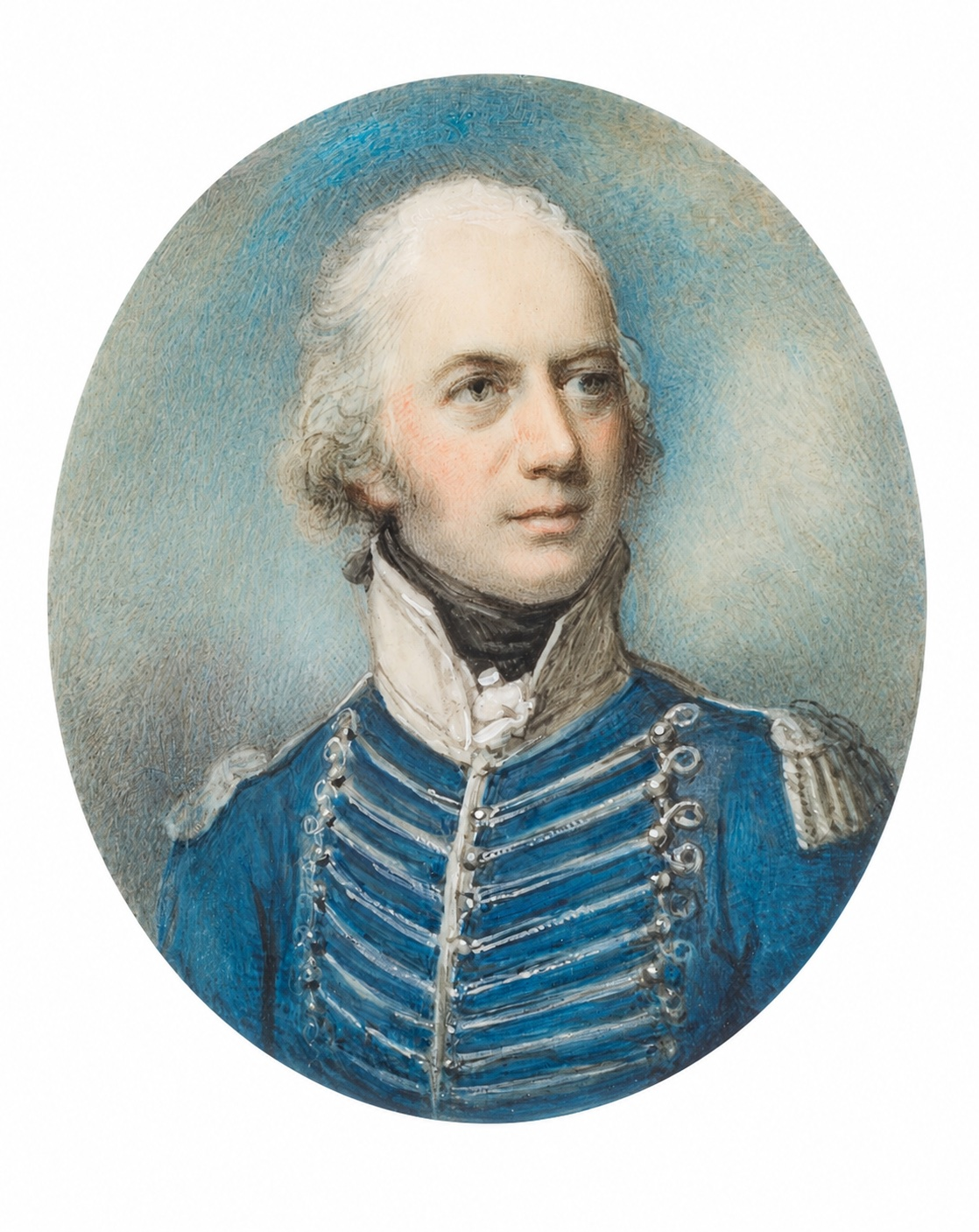
Colonel William Loftus, circa 1794 by Richard Cosway

== Rebellion in Ireland ==
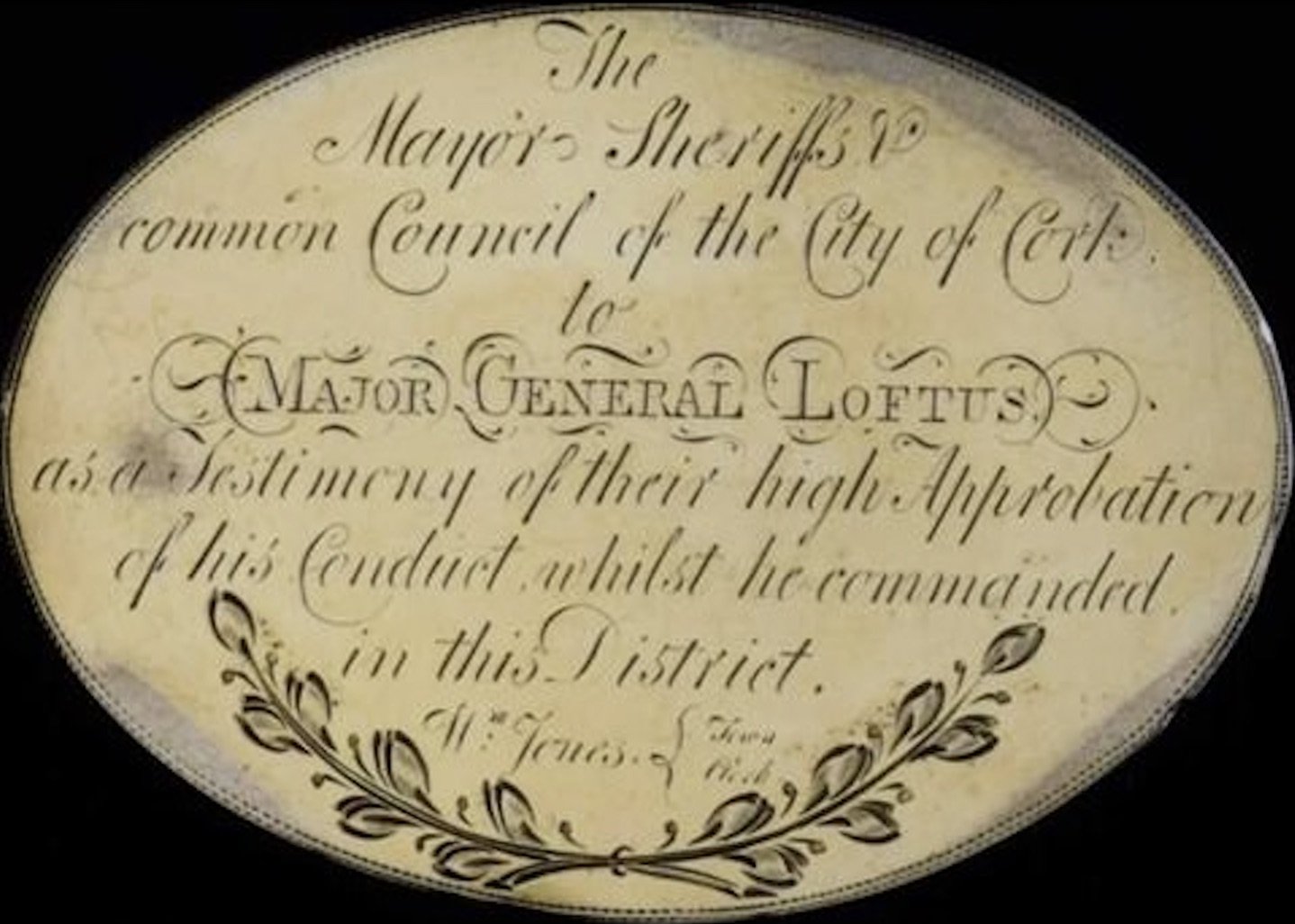
Freedom of the City

Loftus was appointed as ADC to successive Lords Lieutenant of Ireland from 1778 until 1783. He forged life-time friendships in this office, seen as "a good officer and so respectable in his character and connexxions". Loftus returned to active duty in the 3rd Regiment of Guards purchasing a company in 1784, and served as Lt-Colonel based in London. He moved his family to Norfolk in 1790 (ibid.) and in 1794, raised the 24th Light Dragoons, appointed Brevet Colonel of that regiment(portrait left). In 1796, Loftus was made a Major General on the English staff and was sworn in as a Member of the Irish Parliament for Lord Ely and returned to Westminster as member for Great Yarmouth for Lord Townshend in the same year. Loftus was removed to the Irish staff in 1797 at the request of Lord Camden and appointed to be Commander in Chief in Munster based in Cork. He reported back to Camden that the Catholics of Munster were in favour of "good order and government" and that if he wanted to root out sedition, he should look at "Dublin or the North". Loftus left the grateful citizens of Cork in 1798 to take command of Laughlinstown camp. In the same year, he commanded a brigade at the battle of Vinegar Hill and presided over a military court at the trial of Wolfe Tone.

In 1800 Loftus was transferred back to the staff in England but retained both Irish and Parliamentary seats to see the Act of Union through.

== Family ==
Loftus married firstly on 18 February 1778, Margaret daughter of Maccerel King of Lesson Hall, Dublin. They had two sons and two daughters before she died on 4 May 1786. He was married secondly on 7 May 1790 to Lady Elizabeth Townshend, daughter of George Townshend, 1st Marquess Townshend. They had five sons and four daughters.

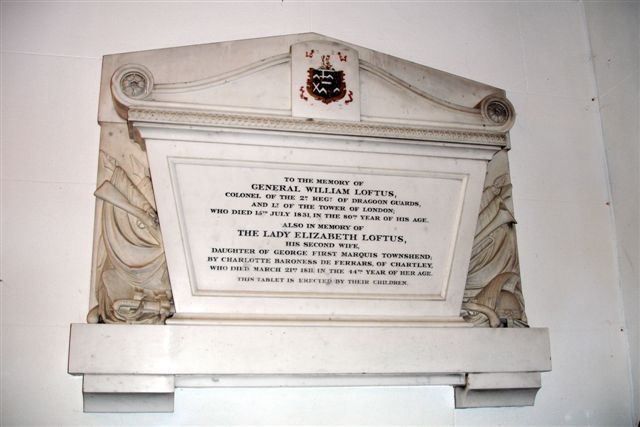
Family Memorial, courtesy of Charles Marquess Townshend

Parliament of Ireland
| Preceded by Charles Tottenham; Luke Fox | Member of Parliament for Fethard; 1796–1798; With: Luke Fox | Succeeded by Henry Alcock; Charles Eustace |
| Preceded by Ponsonby Tottenham; Ephraim Carroll | Member of Parliament for Bannow; 1798–1800; With: Ephraim Carroll 1798–1799; Robert Shaw 1799–1800; Joseph McClean 1800 | Succeeded by Act of Union 1800 |
Parliament of Great Britain
| Preceded by Lord Charles Townshend; Stephens Howe | Member of Parliament for Great Yarmouth; 1796–1800; With: Henry Jodrell | Succeeded by Act of Union 1800 |
Parliament of the United Kingdom
| Preceded by Act of Union 1800 | Member of Parliament for Great Yarmouth; 1801–1802; With: Henry Jodrell | Succeeded by Sir Thomas Troubridge; Thomas Jervis |
| Preceded by Robert Peel; Thomas Carter | Member of Parliament for Tamworth; 1802–1812; With: Sir Robert Peel | Succeeded by Lord Charles Townshend; Sir Robert Peel |
| Preceded by Edward Harbord; Giffin Wilson | Member of Parliament for Great Yarmouth; 1812–1818; With: Edmund Knowles Lacon | Succeeded by Thomas Anson; Charles Rumbold |
Military offices
| Preceded by The Lord Dorchester | Colonel of the 24th Regiment of Dragoons; 1801–1819 | Succeeded by Regiment disbanded |
| Preceded by The Lord Lake | Governor of Dumbarton Castle; 1807–1810 | Succeeded by Andrew John Drummond |
| Preceded by Charles Vernon | Lieutenant of the Tower of London; 1810–1831 | Succeeded by The Earl of Munster |
| Preceded by Sir Charles Craufurd | Colonel of the 2nd Regiment of Dragoon Guards; 1821–1831 | Succeeded by Sir James Hay |
