= Samuel Boyse (politician) =

Irish politician

Samuel Boyse (1696-1711) was an Irish politician.

Boyse was born in Dublin and educated at Trinity College, Dublin. From 1725 until 1730, he was MP for Bannow.

He died as a result of a duel.
