= Crinus Irwin =

19th-century Anglican priest

Crinus Irwin (1771 - 1859) was an Anglican priest in the late eighteenth and early nineteenth centuries, most notably Archdeacon of Ossory from 1822 until his death on 17 December 1859.

He was born in Tanrego, County Sligo, the second son of Lewis-Francis Irwin and his wife Elizabeth Harrison of Lincoln. The first name Crinus is said to be unique to the Irwin family, who came to Ireland with Oliver Cromwell and later settled in Sligo. He entered Trinity College, Cambridge in 1790 and graduated B.A in 1794. In 1807 he graduated M.A. from Trinity College, Dublin. He was ordained in 1794, and in 1797 was appointed Vicar choral of St Patrick's Cathedral, Dublin. In 1799 he was appointed Prebendary of St Patrick's. He was Vicar general of the Diocese of Ferns and Leighlin from 1822 until 1835.

He married in 1807 Amy Chamberlain, daughter of William Tankerville Chamberlain, justice of the Court of King's Bench (Ireland) and Lucy Boyd. Amy died in 1849. They had six children, including John, Lewis, (a Captain in the Royal Scots Fusiliers), Amy, Elizabeth and Lucy, who are buried in Mount Jerome Cemetery, Dublin. Amy married a Tankerville cousin; Elizabeth and Lucy never married.
