= Walter Bunbury =

Irish politician

Walter Bunbury was an Irish politician.

Bunbury was educated at Trinity College, Dublin.

Bunbury was MP for the Irish constituency of Thomastown from 1703 until 1713.
