= William Tankerville Chamberlain =

Irish judge (1751–1802)

William Tankerville Chamberlain (25 June 1751 – 12 May 1802) was an Irish judge of the late eighteenth and early nineteenth century. He was highly praised by his contemporaries for his ability and integrity, but his reputation has suffered as a result of his conduct as a judge at the trial for treason of William Orr, which is widely regarded as a grave miscarriage of justice.

== Personal life ==
Chamberlain was born in Dublin, the son of Michael Chamberlain, counsellor-at-law, and his wife Deborah Roberts, an heiress who was described as "charming and accomplished". He attended St. Bees School in West Cumbria, matriculated from the Trinity College Dublin in 1769 and took his degree of Bachelor of Arts there in 1774. He entered the Middle Temple in 1775 and was called to the Bar in 1779.

=== Wife and children ===
He married Lucy Boyd, eldest daughter of Higatt Boyd of Rosslare House, Rosslare Harbour, and his wife Amy Phillips, and had at least six children:

- Higatt, who died in infancy,
- Michael, an army officer.
- William junior (died 1821).
- Charles, a diplomat who spent part of his career in South America and part in Spain. Charles had an only son, the third William Tankerville Chamberlain (1824–1842), who joined the Army but died in India, aged only 18. Charles died in 1845: his last will and testament is in the National Archives.
- Amy (died 1849), who married in 1807 the Reverend Crinus Irwin, Archdeacon of Ossory, by whom she had two sons, John Lewis and Lewis Chamberlain (a Captain in the Royal Scots Fusiliers), and four daughters, including Lucy, Elizabeth and the younger Amy (died 1852), who married her cousin Tankerville Chamberlain, counsellor-at-law. Several of her children are buried in Mount Jerome Cemetery.
- Sophia, who married Henry Archer.

He lived mainly at Churchtown, Dublin.

== Career ==
To advance his career Chamberlain joined the well-known political club, the Order of St. Patrick or the Screw, whose members called themselves The Monks of the Screw. He sat in the Irish House of Commons as member for Clonmines, but though he was noted for his wit and talent, he did not have much reputation as a politician.

He was appointed a justice of the Court of Common Pleas in 1793 and was transferred to the Court of King's Bench the following year. He sat on the Special Commission to deal with the Rebellion of 1798.

== Last years ==
His health was poor: he called himself "a martyr to the gout". He died in 1802, aged only 51. He was buried in St. Ann's Church, Dawson Street. His widow moved to England: she died at Bath in 1831.

== State trials ==
As he was generally agreed to be an able and conscientious judge, it was natural that Chamberlain should play a large part in the political trials of the mid-1790s, which culminated in the Irish Rebellion of 1798. That he should be attacked by United Irishmen and nationalists generally was understandable; but one notable trial, that of William Orr, damaged his reputation even among his admirers.

He sat on a commission to try cases of treason in 1795–6, but most of the accused were acquitted. At the summer assizes in Armagh in 1797, where more than 150 people were tried for sedition, Chamberlain had "the awful and unexampled duty" of sentencing 20 men to death at one sitting. After the 1798 Rebellion he sat on the special commission to try the rebels, but the verdicts do not suggest that he displayed any great degree of severity: only five people were put on trial and only one was hanged.

Another state trial, that of Patrick Finney in 1798, shows Chamberlain as a judge at his best. Finney, a Dublin tobacconist, was charged with treason, largely on the word of one James O'Brien. He was defended by John Philpot Curran, who in one of his most famous speeches destroyed O'Brien's credit. Chamberlain conducted the trial with notable fairness: in his summing up he cast doubt on the evidence of O'Brien, and virtually directed an acquittal. The jury found Finney not guilty. Notwithstanding his conduct in the case of William Orr, there is little evidence overall that Chamberlain was a political time-server.

=== William Orr ===
William Orr, a popular and respected farmer from County Antrim, was charged with administering the United Irishman oath to a soldier called Hugh Wheately: this had recently been made a capital offence, and, in a departure from the normal rules of evidence, only one witness was required to swear to the commission of the offence. Orr was tried at the summer assizes in 1797 before Lord Avonmore, the Chief Baron of the Irish Exchequer, and Chamberlain. John Philpot Curran, defending, exposed Wheately as a liar and a man of general bad character and argued that the jury had no choice but to acquit. His argument that the judges had misstated the law led to angry exchanges between counsel and the Bench. The circumstances which led to the guilty verdict later caused much comment, two of the jury claiming that they had been made drunk, and two others claiming that they had been threatened. It may be that the judges themselves had doubts about Orr's guilt as Avonmore is said to have shed tears as he pronounced the death sentence. Despite numerous pleas for a reprieve, Orr was hanged at Carrickfergus on 14 October. Wheatley, the crucial witness against him, died soon afterwards, probably by his own hand. Shortly before his death, he is said to have confessed that he had perjured himself at Orr's trial.

As it is generally accepted now that Orr was innocent, Chamberlain clearly shares the responsibility for the miscarriage of justice; however, Avonmore was very much the senior judge and seems to have dominated the proceedings. The Government, aware of the hostile public reaction, praised both judges for "integrity and humanity". On the other hand, a Dublin newspaper, The Press, was sufficiently concerned by the trial to attack the conduct of both judges, and the editor, Peter Finnerty was prosecuted and convicted for seditious libel as a result.

== Character ==
Chamberlain was praised as an able and upright judge and a sound lawyer; even his conduct of the Orr trial had its defenders. When he died in 1802, the newly appointed Lord Chancellor of Ireland, Lord Redesdale, was warned that it would not be easy to find a suitable replacement. He had a great gift for friendship: his colleague, later Lord Chief Justice of Ireland, Lord Downes, when he died in 1826 asked to be buried in St. Ann's Church, Dawson Street, beside Chamberlain, his inseparable friend for many years: "their union and friendship was complete....and now they lie together in the same tomb". Like most judges of the time he was notably extravagant: judges were expected to live and entertain on a scale which put their expenses far beyond their salaries, and Chamberlain, who had a wife and six children to support, is said to have died almost penniless.

Parliament of Ireland
Preceded by Charles Tottenham; Nicholas Loftus Tottenham	Member of Parliament for Clonmines; 1791–1794; With: Nicholas Loftus Tottenham	Succeeded by Nicholas Loftus Tottenham; Charles Eustace
