= Henry Luttrell (wit) =

18th/19th-century English politician, wit, and writer of society verse

- Born: 1765
- Died: 1851 (aged 85–86)

Henry Luttrell (c. 1765 – 19 December 1851) was an English politician, wit and writer of society verse. He was the illegitimate son of Henry Lawes Luttrell, 2nd Earl of Carhampton, Tory MP and career soldier.

Henry Luttrell secured a seat in the Irish House of Commons for Clonmines in 1798 and a post in the Irish government, which he commuted for a pension. Introduced into London society by the Georgiana Cavendish, Duchess of Devonshire, his wit made him popular. Soon he began to write verse, in which the foibles of fashionable people were outlined.

In London and in Paris, he was a frequent dinner-table companion of Thomas Moore, Ireland's national bard, an hagiographer of United Irishmen whose insurrection in 1798 Luttrell's father, as Commander-in-Chief, Ireland, had vigorously suppressed. Through Moore, he was also introduced to the Whig grandees Lord Lansdowne and Lord John Russell.

In 1820, he published his Advice to Julia, of which a second edition, altered and amplified, appeared in 1823 as Letters to Julia in Rhyme. This poem, suggested by the ode to Lydia in the first book of Horace's Odes, was his most important work. His more serious literary contemporaries nicknamed it "Letters of a Dandy to a Dolly."

In 1827 in Crockford House, he wrote a satire on the high play then in vogue. Byron characterized him as "the best sayer of good things, and the most epigrammatic conversationist I ever met"; Sir Walter Scott wrote of him as "the great London wit," and Lady Blessington described him as the one talker "who always makes me think."

Luttrell died in London on 19 December 1851.

Luttrell was himself the subject of one of his friend Sydney Smith's best-known lines, to the effect that his idea of heaven was "eating paté de foie gras to the sound of trumpets".

Parliament of Ireland
Preceded by Ponsonby Tottenham; Luke Fox	Member of Parliament for Clonmines; 1799–1800; Served alongside: Ponsonby Tottenham	Succeeded by Ponsonby Tottenham; Henry Eustace
