= Charles Tottenham (1685–1758) =

Irish Member of Parliament

Charles Tottenham (24 August 1694 – 20 September 1758) was an Irish Member of Parliament.

He was the son of Edward Tottenham, of Tottenham Green, by his second wife, Jane Hudle.

He sat in the Irish House of Commons for New Ross from 1727 until his death. He was also High Sheriff of Wexford for 1737–38.

He was married firstly to Ellinor, daughter of John Cliffe of Mulrankin, County Wexford and his wife Barbara Carr, and by her had six sons, including John and Charles, both of whom were also MPs for New Ross, and two daughters. He became a widower on 5 June 1745 and married secondly Mary, daughter of John Grogan of Johnstown, with no further issue.
