= Ponsonby Tottenham =

Anglo-Irish politician (1746–1818)

Ponsonby Tottenham (1746 – 13 December 1818) was an Anglo-Irish politician.

== Biography ==
Tottenham sat in the Irish House of Commons as the Member of Parliament for Fethard between 1779 and 1790, before sitting for Bannow from 1790 and 1797. He then represented Clonmines between 1797 and the seat's disfranchisement under the Acts of Union 1800. In 1800 he had been appointed Clerk of the Ordnance in the Irish Board of Ordnance and was awarded compensation of £487 2s. 6d per annum following the abolition of the post after the Union. Tottenham subsequently sat in the House of Commons of the United Kingdom as the MP for Wexford from 1801 to 1802, before representing New Ross between 1805 and 1806.

Parliament of Ireland
Preceded by Charles Tottenham; Robert Hellen	Member of Parliament for Fethard; 1779–1790; With: Charles Tottenham (1779–1783); Ephraim Carroll (1783–1790)	Succeeded by Charles Tottenham; Thomas Loftus
Preceded by Henry Loftus; Nicholas Loftus Tottenham	Member of Parliament for Bannow; 1790–1797; With: Ephraim Carroll	Succeeded by William Loftus; Ephraim Carroll
Preceded by Nicholas Loftus Tottenham; Charles Eustace	Member of Parliament for Clonmines; 1797–1800; With: Luke Fox (1798–1799); Henry Luttrell (1799–1800); Henry Eustace (1800)	Succeeded by Constituency disenfranchised
Parliament of the United Kingdom
Preceded by Francis Leigh	Member of Parliament for Wexford; 1801–1802	Succeeded by Richard Nevill
Preceded by Charles Tottenham	Member of Parliament for New Ross; 1805–1806	Succeeded by Charles Leigh
