= Richard Archdall =

Irish politician

Richard Archdall was an Irish politician in the last decade of the 18th Century and the first decade of the 19th.

Archdall was educated at Harrow School and Trinity College, Dublin. He was a Tory MP in the Irish House of Commons for Ardfert in County Kerry from 1790 until 1798 and then Killibegs in County Donegal from 1798 until 1801. He was then MP for Kilkenny from March to July 1802 and for Dundalk from then until 1806.
