= Nicholas Loftus Tottenham =

Anglo-Irish politician

Nicholas Loftus Tottenham (1745 – 11 March 1823) was an Anglo-Irish politician.

Tottenham represented Bannow in the Irish House of Commons between 1776 and 1790, before sitting for Clonmines from 1790 to 1797.

Parliament of Ireland
Preceded by Charles Tottenham; Robert Hellen	Member of Parliament for Bannow; 1776–1790; With: Henry Loftus	Succeeded by Ponsonby Tottenham; Ephraim Carroll
Preceded by Thomas Loftus; Charles Tottenham	Member of Parliament for Clonmines; 1790–1797; With: Charles Tottenham (1790–1791); William Tankerville Chamberlain (1791–1794); Charles Eustace (1794–1797)	Succeeded by Ponsonby Tottenham; Luke Fox
