= Francis Hardy (Irish politician) =

18th/19th-century Irish barrister, politician and biographer

Francis Hardy (1751–1812) was an Irish barrister, politician and biographer.

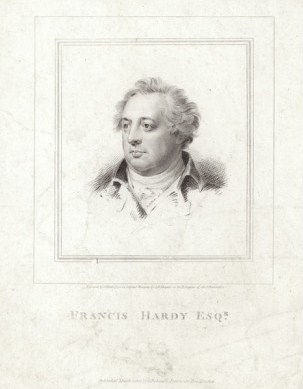
Francis Hardy, 1811 engraving

== Life ==
Hardy graduated B.A. at Trinity College, Dublin in 1771, and was called to the bar in 1777. In politics, he was an associate of Henry Grattan. In 1783, through the interest of the Earl of Granard, Hardy was returned as member for Mullingar in the Parliament of Ireland.

Hardy sat as representative for Mullingar from his first entrance into parliament until the Union with Great Britain in 1800/01. He was an effective speaker, but only took part in major debates. Although he was short of money Hardy declined governmental overtures, by which it sought to induce him to vote for the legislative union with Great Britain.

After the Union, Hardy retired to the country, and passed much of his time with Grattan and his family. He was appointed a commissioner of appeals at Dublin in 1806. He died on 26 July 1812, and was interred at Kilcommon, County Wicklow.

== Works ==
Hardy co-operated with Lord Charlemont in the establishment of the Royal Irish Academy at Dublin in 1786, and in 1788 contributed to its publications a dissertation on some passages in the Agamemnon of Æschylus.

The publication of some of the writings of Charlemont, who had died in 1799, was planned by Hardy; and he then undertook a biography at the suggestion of Richard Lovell Edgeworth. He received assistance from the Charlemont family, Grattan and others. It appeared in London in 1810, Memoirs of the Political and Private Life of James Caulfield, Earl of Charlemont, Knight of St. Patrick. The memoirs are not completely accurate. An edition with little alteration was issued in London in 1812, in two volumes.

== Notes ==
Attribution

This article incorporates text from a publication now in the public domain: Stephen, Leslie; Lee, Sidney, eds. (1890). "Hardy, Francis". Dictionary of National Biography. Vol. 24. London: Smith, Elder & Co.
