= Henry Alcock (died 1812) =

Irish politician

Henry Alcock (1717-1812) was an Irish politician.

Alcock was educated at Trinity College, Dublin. He was M.P. for Clonmines in County Wexford from 1761 to 1768; and Waterford City from 1783 to 1797; for Fethard in County Wexford in 1798.
