= John Ball (Drogheda MP) =

Irish politician

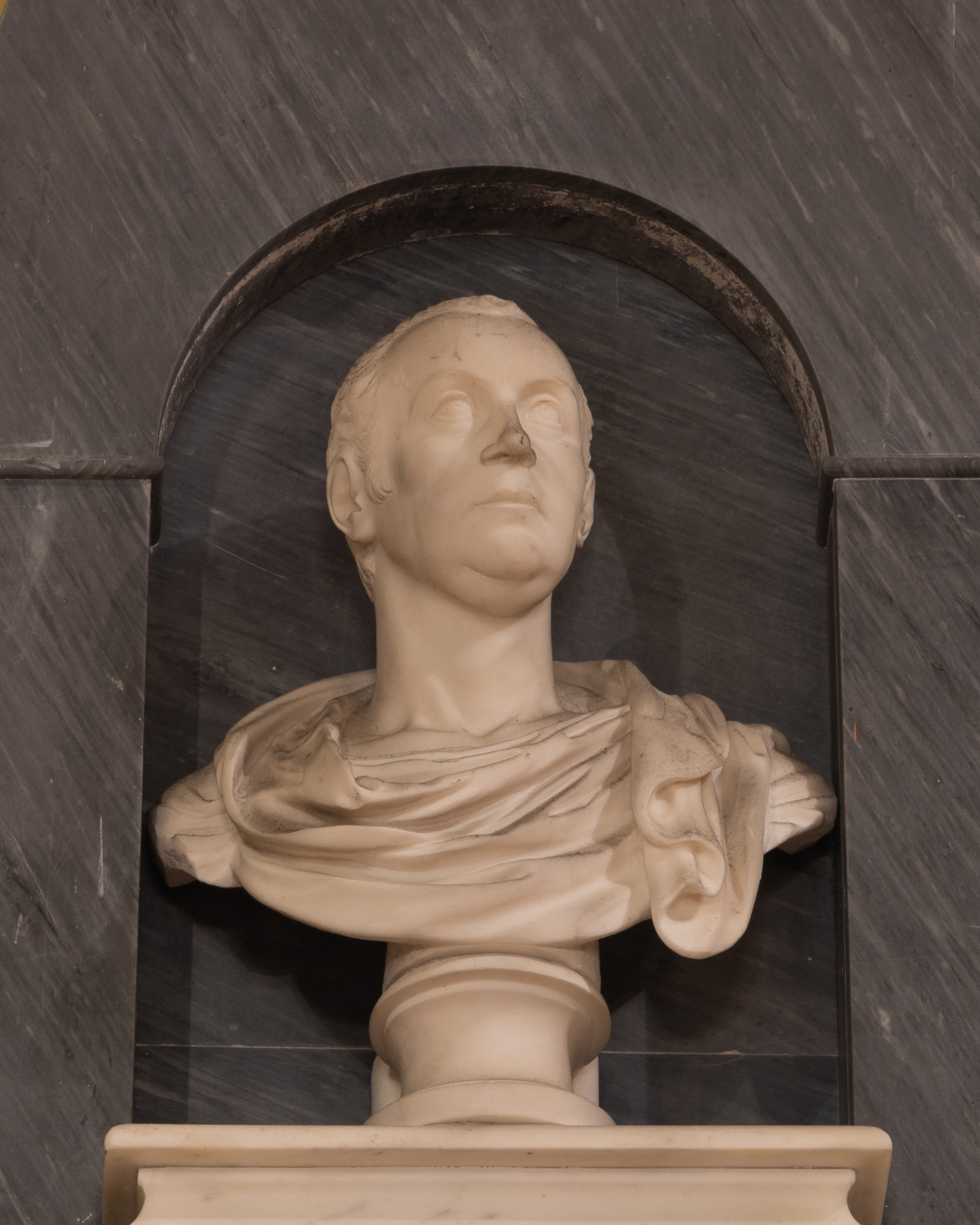
Bust sculpted by John Smyth in 1837

John Ball (c. 1754 – 24 August 1813) was an Irish barrister and politician.

Ball was educated at Trinity College, Dublin. From 1796 to 1800, he was MP for Drogheda in the Irish House of Commons. Ball pleaded without success against the union in parliament and was seen as one of the most able lawyers of his day.
