= Dudley Loftus =

Anglo-Irish jurist and orientalist (1619–1695)

Dr Dudley Loftus (1619 – June 1695) was an Anglo-Irish jurist and noted orientalist.

Loftus was born the second son of Sir Adam Loftus and his wife Jane Vaughan, daughter of Walter Vaughan, into a family of 17 siblings on his great-grandfather’s estate of Rathfarnham Castle, Dublin. He graduated from Trinity College, Dublin when 18, then entered Oxford University in 1639 on the advice of Bishop Usher, taking his Master of Arts degree in 1641.

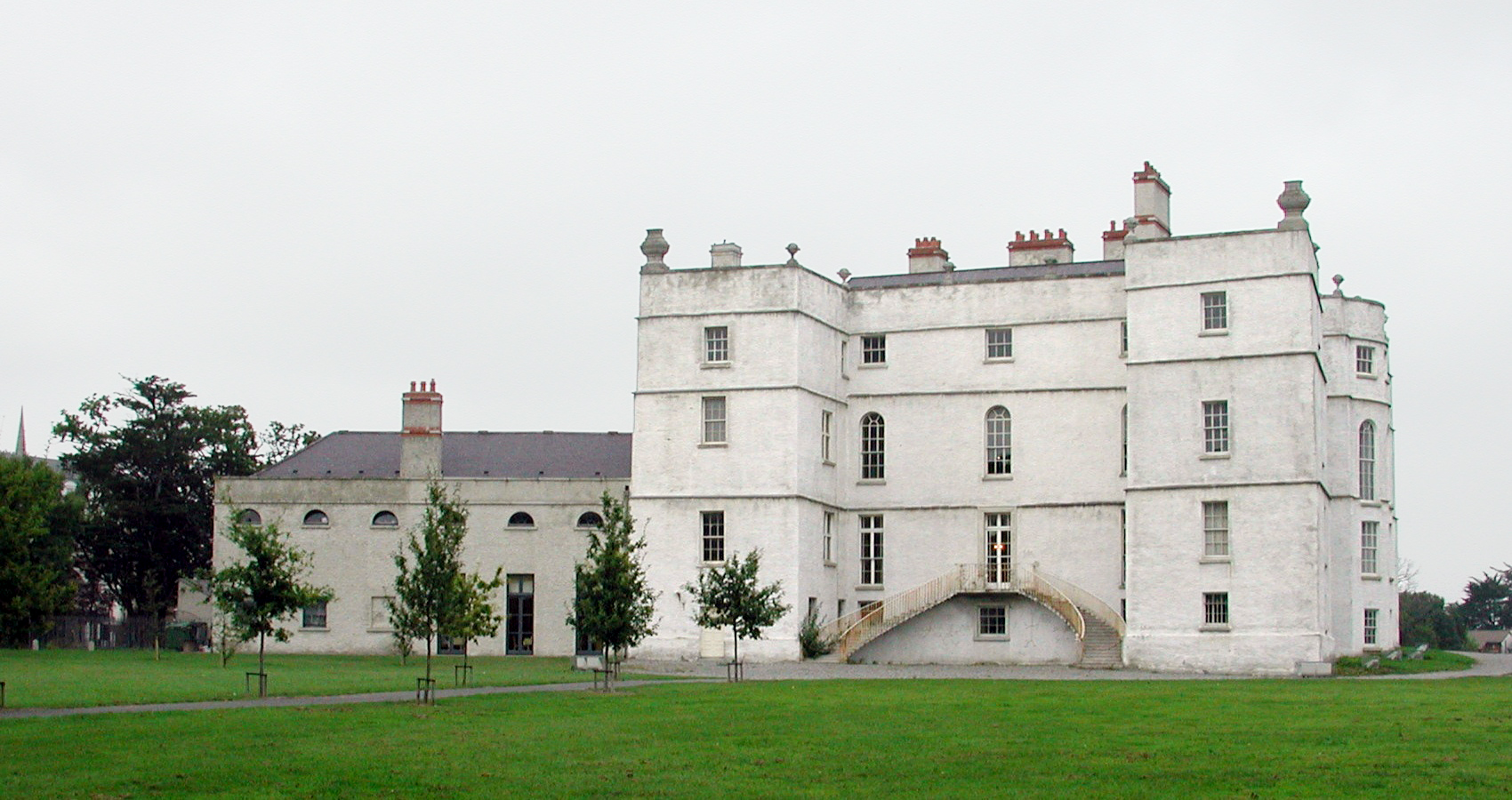
Rathfarnham Castle, Dublin

In his lifetime he was acclaimed as a linguist, and his reputation as an orientalist was unrivalled thanks to his Latin translations from Ethiopic, Armenian, Syriac, Hebrew, Arabic, and Persian texts. He served four times as a Member of the Irish House of Commons, representing Naas between 1642 and 1648, the combined counties of Kildare and Wicklow in the Third Protectorate Parliament of 1659 at Westminster, Bannow between 1661 and 1666 and Fethard between 1692 and 1693. He was also Vicar General of Ireland, Judge of the Prerogative Court of Ireland, and Senior Master in Chancery. He inherited the family seat of Rathfarnham Castle in 1659.

Despite his many accomplishments, Archbishop Narcissus Marsh wrote of him that "he never knew so much Learning in the Keeping of a Fool". Even so, the archbishop collected the majority of Loftus' manuscripts and housed them at a public library, Marsh's Library), next to St. Patrick's Cathedral, where they can be seen to this day. Jonathan Swift for his part described Loftus thus: "Let him be hailed amongst the junior fellows, with his short feet and rhinoceros nose …..Because of his looks and eloquence we name him Ulysses; for Ulysses was not handsome but he had the gift of tongues. No Tartar is more fair, no Athenian better hung, / Sol varnish’d o’er his face, and Mercury his tongue. For his height let us salute him as Ajax, for his scrawniness as Tithonus, for his shaking head as the palsied Priam, for his swiftness as Achilles and finally (for his giant shanks), as the Colossus."

Loftus is interred in the family vault in St. Patrick's Cathedral, Dublin.

He was married to Frances Nagle, daughter of Patrick Nagle and Mary Bolton, and granddaughter of Sir Thomas Nagle, 19th Baron of Navan, and his wife Marian Fagan; and of Sir Edward Bolton, Chief Baron of the Irish Exchequer, and Isabella Ayloffe. They had seven children, of whom only one daughter Letitia survived infancy.

== See also ==
- Annals of Dudley Loftus

Parliament of Ireland
Unknown	Member of Parliament for Fethard (County Wexford); 1692–1695; With: Sir Richard Bulkeley, 2nd Bt	Succeeded by Sir Richard Bulkeley, 2nd Bt; Sir Nicholas Loftus
