= John Cliffe =

Irish barrister, landowner and politician

John Cliffe (1661–1728) was an Irish barrister, landowner and politician. He sat in the Irish House of Commons for many years, where he was often called on to speak for the Government, and held the office of Serjeant-at-law (Ireland).

He was probably born at Dungulf Castle, near Fethard-on-Sea, County Wexford. He was the eldest son among the eleven children of John Cliffe and Eleanor Loftus, fifth daughter of Nicholas Loftus of Fethard and Margaret Chetham. His father was a trusted Cromwellian official who came to Ireland in 1649 to serve as secretary to Henry Ireton, son-in-law of Oliver Cromwell and Lord Deputy of Ireland. Cliffe was sometimes referred to as the Irish "Secretary of War", though this was not his official title. At the Restoration of Charles II his Cromwellian past was not held against him: he was confirmed in the numerous grants of land he had received in Wexford and in County Meath, including Dungulf and Mulrankin. He became a respected local politician, serving as MP for Taghmon 1661-6 and High Sheriff of Wexford 1680–81. He died in 1691.

John, the son, was called to the Bar and became Third Serjeant in 1711, and Second Serjeant in 1712. Government Law Officers, including the Serjeants, then were strictly political appointments, and Cliffe as a Tory, in common with virtually all of the Irish judges and Law Officers, was summarily dismissed on the accession of George I in 1714.

In 1693 and 1698 he sat on a Commission to organise a Government loan. He sat in the Parliament of Ireland as member for Bannow in every Parliament from 1695 until his retirement from politics in 1727. So long as the Tory Party was in power, he was a leading Government speaker in the Commons. He died at New Ross in 1728.

He married Barbara Carr, eldest daughter of William Carr of Cork city in 1694, and they had sixteen children, including John, the eldest son and heir, Barbara, Mary and Ellinor (died 1745). Ellinor married Charles Tottenham MP and had at least six children including Sir John Tottenham, 1st Baronet, who was the father of the first Marquess of Ely. Mary married John Leigh of Rosegarland, County Wexford: their descendants were still living at Rosegarland in the 21st century. Barbara married Arthur Gifford of County Cork and had issue.

In the early nineteenth century, the Cliffe family bought Bellevue, Ballyhogue, County Wexford, which became the main family residence. The family extensively rebuilt the house, with results which were praised as "magnificent". It was burnt to the ground in 1923 during the Irish Civil War.

== Sources ==
- Armstrong, Robert, "Cliffe, John", Dictionary of Irish Biography (father)
- Burke, Bernard Landed Gentry of Great Britain and Ireland Henry Colburn London 1847
- Hart, A. R. History of the King's Serjeants at Law in Ireland Dublin Four Courts Press 2000
