= Clonmines (Parliament of Ireland constituency) =

Pre-1801 Irish constituency

- Former borough constituency for the Irish House of Commons
- County: County Wexford
- Borough: Clonmines

–1801
- Replaced by: Disfranchised

Clonmines was a constituency represented in the Irish House of Commons until its abolition on 1 January 1801. It was a rotten borough associated with the deserted Norman borough of Clonmines, in southwest County Wexford.

== History ==
In the Patriot Parliament of 1689 summoned by James II, Clonmines was represented with two members.

== Members of Parliament ==
- 1634–1635: James Brien and John Cullen
- 1639–1649: disenfranchised - no record
- 1661–1666: Francis Harvey and John Edgeworth

Election	First MP	Second MP
1689	Edward Sherlock	Nicholas White
1692	Henry Loftus	Thomas Philips
1695	Henry Loftus	Maurice Annesley
1703	James Butler	Walter Bunbury
1713	Nicholas Loftus	George Houghton
1715	Philip Doyne	George Houghton
November 1727	Thomas Loftus	Henry Ponsonby (Note: Also elected for Inistioge in 1727, for which he chose to sit)
1727	Thomas Loftus	Edward Corker
1734	Thomas Loftus	William Tighe
1761	Henry Alcock	Charles Tottenham
1768	Henry Loftus	Charles Tottenham
1776	Arthur Loftus	Charles Tottenham
1781	Thomas Loftus (Note: Also elected for Fethard (County Wexford) in 1790, for which he chose to sit)	Charles Tottenham
1790	Nicholas Loftus Tottenham	Charles Tottenham
1791	Nicholas Loftus Tottenham	William Tankerville Chamberlain
1794	Nicholas Loftus Tottenham	Charles Eustace
1798	Ponsonby Tottenham	Luke Fox
1799	Ponsonby Tottenham	Henry Luttrell
1800	Ponsonby Tottenham	Henry Eustace
1801	Disenfranchised	

== Bibliography ==
- O'Hart, John (2007). The Irish and Anglo-Irish Landed Gentry: When Cromwell came to Ireland. Vol. II. Heritage Books. ISBN 978-0-7884-1927-0.
- Leigh Rayment's historical List of Members of the Irish House of Commons. Cites: Johnston-Liik, Edith Mary (2002). The History of the Irish Parliament 1692-1800 (6 volumes). Ulster Historical Foundation.
