= Henry Loftus (1725–1792) =

Irish Member of Parliament

Captain Henry Loftus (1725 - 1792) of Sackville Street was an Anglo-Irish Member of Parliament in the Irish House of Commons from 1768 until 1790, having previously served in the 30th Regiment of Foot for 25 years in Ireland, England, Germany, Flanders, France, Portugal and Gibraltar.

== Early life ==
Henry Loftus was born in Ireland, the youngest of three sons to Simon and Hannah Loftus (née Johnson). His father had been transferred back to Ireland having served as a captain in Colonel Harrison's Regiment in the Battles of Malplaquet and Glen Shiel. Loftus is thought to have grown up in the parish of Clara to a military household with his elder brothers, each a year apart in age and each later to be commissioned in the British Army at the age of sixteen. His eldest brother Ensign Dudley Loftus joined their father's regiment in 1739 just before it was deployed to the Caribbean. Dudley Loftus was killed during the assault on Fort San Lazar in 1741, and his father died almost a year later, (Note: by then promoted to lieutenant colonel) partly from injuries sustained in the same battle and partly from disease contracted at sea off Jamaica. Weeks after his father's death in service, Loftus was granted a commission in the British Army as a second lieutenant.

== Military career ==
Loftus joined the 30th Regiment of Foot in May 1742 at a time when the regiment was augmented as part of the Irish establishment, partly in response to Prussian expansion into Moravia. He spent two years learning his craft as an officer in the British Army before being transferred to the English establishment in 1744. Loftus spent the next three years moving with his regiment around southern England, bolstering coastal defences against possible invasion by the French and defending London from the Jacobite Army's incursion into England in 1745.

The following year, Loftus was transferred to Portsmouth to form part of an amphibious force intended to conduct raids against French forces on land and at sea. He was placed in command of a detachment of marines aboard HMS Monmouth, returning to Ireland with the end of the war in 1748.

The next few years of Continental and British strategic realignment allowed Loftus to return to Ireland for a period of respite and was restored to the English establishment in 1755 shortly before France and Austria declared war on Britain. Loftus served with his regiment throughout the Seven Years' War taking part in military engagements in Brittany, Saxony and the Belle Île, where he was recognised for his gallantry and promoted to captain. While returning from Belle Île, Loftus's transport ship encountered severe gales, was captured by a French flotilla of privateers and was forced into Dieppe harbour, where he remained for several months before an exchange of prisoners could be arranged. The end of the Seven Years' War in 1763 resulted in his regiment being transferred to Gibraltar.

== Parliamentary career ==
In 1767, Loftus resigned his commission in the Army and returned to England at the same time as George Townshend was appointed Lord Lieutenant of Ireland. (Note: with whom he was connected by marriage) Loftus declared his intention to stand for the Irish Parliament the following year in a pocket borough under the patronage of his distant undertaker cousin, the Honourable Henry Loftus. Loftus served as a Member of Parliament for the boroughs of Clonmines from 1768 to 1775 and Bannow from 1776 to 1790. Both boroughs were in the pocket of his cousin, who commanded up to ten seats in the Irish House of Commons constituting a powerful voting bloc known as the Loftus Squadron. (Note: the Loftus Squadron (AKA Ely Legion or Loftus Legion) formed one of the most powerful voting blocs in the Irish House of Commons under the patronage of whoever owned the family seat at Loftus Hall between 1692 and 1801, and the Wexford estates adjacent to it. In 1769, the Squadron was directed by the Hon. Henry Loftus, one of a handful of elite Irish Protestants known as "undertakers", the "grandees" of the Protestant Ascendancy.)

Townshend prorogued Parliament in 1767 having failed to get the undertakers to support his money bill, thereby gaining sixteen months to build a 'Castle Party' through new appointments and the granting patronage. (Note: Townshend granted a Cornetcy to Loftus's second son William) With increasing scrutiny from Westminster in 1770, relationships between Dublin Castle and the Loftus Squadron were strained. Townshend threatened to remove Loftus from his position in the revenues office and to suspend his wife's pension. Following a period of negotiation and public scandal, the Loftus Squadron voted to reappoint Townshend as Lord Lieutenant in 1771. Shortly after, Loftus was restored to the accounts board and his cousin was created Earl of Ely. The Loftus Squadron continued to vote with the Government until Townshend was recalled to England in 1772.

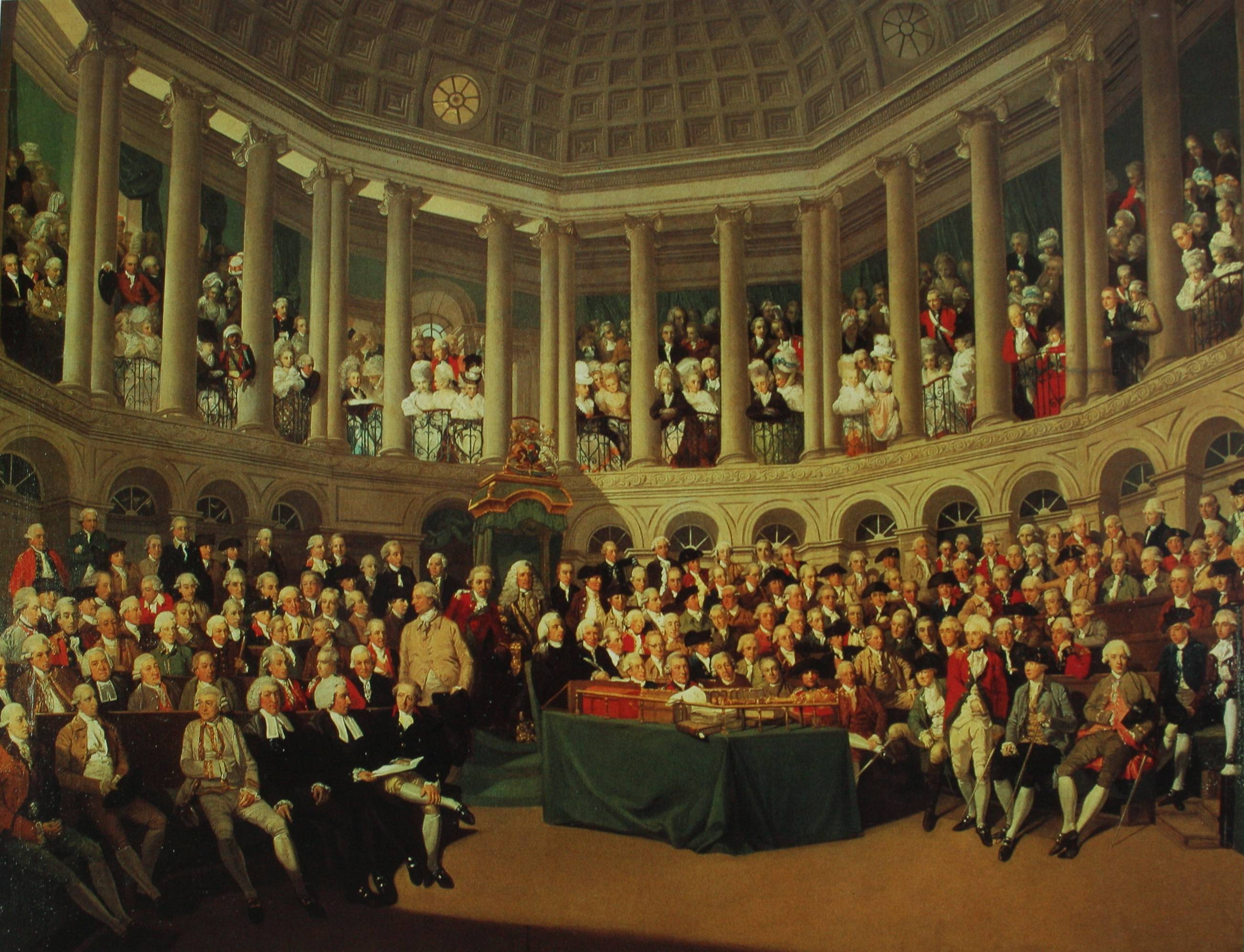
The Irish House of Commons in 1780 by Francis Wheatley, which would feature Loftus's likeness (unknown)

Townshend's successors were in general much less combative and more accessible to the demands of the Protestant Ascendancy. Loftus was able to secure two additional sinecure posts in the administration, which he executed with diligence. Although Loftus continued to vote with the Government, he increasingly opposed the growing influence of the emerging Patriot Party, whose members were emboldened by events in America to press for legislative independence for Ireland. In 1775, the British Government drew heavily on the Irish establishment of the Army to serve in what became the American War of Independence, including Loftus's own son William. By 1778, roughly half of the Army had left Ireland, leaving the island vulnerable to the threat of invasion from France, prompting calls for Catholic emancipation.

An attempt to make up the shortfall in security resulted in the creation of an Irish Volunteer force in 1776, which was initially resisted by Dublin Castle. (Note: The Irish Patriot Party used the Irish Volunteers as a bargaining chip to get concessions from Dublin Castle, which the new Lord Lieutenant wanted to disarm in 1779 but was persuaded to relent.) Under increased pressure from the Patriots, Loftus voted against relief for Catholics in 1774 and again in 1778, but a relief bill was carried seven weeks after similar legislation had passed in England. (Note: the vote in Britain resulted in riots in Scotland and London. The bill passed in Ireland without significant disorder.)

Loftus dedicated his second and third terms in Parliament to opposing the aims of the Irish Patriots and retired from politics in 1790.

== Family ==
At the age of twenty, Loftus's first assignment in England was in Norfolk, most likely Swaffham where Diana Bullock lived. Diana was the daughter of local landed gentry with ties to the Townshend family at Raynham Hall. Within a year, Loftus had met and finally married Diana just two days before his regiment marched off to Canterbury. (Note: Viscountess Etheldreda Townshend had publicly separated from her husband in 1741 to live in London, taking her daughter with her, while their sons (George and Charles, who were the same age as Henry Loftus) were living in The Hague in 1745 having become estranged from their father; Henry Loftus listed Raynham in his will dated 1790 as one of his two main residences, the other being Sackville Street in Dublin) Despite Loftus's challenging relationship with George Townshend in Ireland, (Note: Henry Loftus's links to Raynham Hall continued for the rest of his life but there is no published evidence that he actually knew George Townshend before they served together in the Irish Government in 1767) his second son General William Loftus married Townshend's eldest daughter, Lady Elizabeth Townshend, in 1790.

Diana Loftus died in Dublin at the end of August 1792. Henry returned to Raynham Hall not long after and died a few weeks later at Raynham, where he is buried in the cemetery of St. Mary's Church.

== Notes and references ==
=== References ===
Parliament of Ireland
Preceded by Henry Alcock	Member of Parliament for Clonmines; 1768 – 1775; With: Charles Tottenham	Succeeded by Arthur Loftus
Preceded by Charles Tottenham	Member of Parliament for Bannow; 1776 – 1790; With: Nicholas Loftus Tottenham	Succeeded by Nicholas Loftus Tottenham
