= Sir John Tottenham, 1st Baronet =

Anglo-Irish politician

Sir John Tottenham, 1st Baronet (6 July 1714 – 2 January 1787) was an Anglo-Irish politician.

== Biography ==
Tottenham was the son of Charles Tottenham and his first wife Ellinor Cliffe, daughter of John Cliffe of Mulrankin, County Wexford and Barbara Carr of Cork. He sat in the Irish House of Commons as the Member of Parliament for New Ross from 1759 and 1760, before representing Fethard between 1767 and 1776. On 18 December 1780 he was created a baronet, of Tottenham Green in the Baronetage of Ireland.

He married Hon. Elizabeth Loftus, daughter of Nicholas Loftus, 1st Viscount Loftus and Hon. Anne Ponsonby, on 31 December 1736. Tottenham was succeeded in his title by his only son, Charles Tottenham, who assumed the additional surname of Loftus in 1783 and was created Marquess of Ely in 1800. He also had three daughters including Mary, who married Richard Annesley and had issue.

Parliament of Ireland
Preceded by Charles Tottenham; Robert Leigh	Member of Parliament for New Ross; 1759–1760; With: Robert Leigh	Succeeded by Charles Tottenham; Robert Leigh
Preceded by Nicholas Hume-Loftus; William Alcock	Member of Parliament for Fethard; 1767–1776; With: William Alcock (1767–1768); Arthur Loftus (1768–1776)	Succeeded by Charles Tottenham; Robert Hellen
Baronetage of Ireland
New creation	Baronet (of Tottenham Green); 1780–1787	Succeeded by Charles Tottenham
