= Drogheda (Parliament of Ireland constituency) =

Pre-1801 Irish constituency

- Former borough constituency for the Irish House of Commons
- County: County Louth
- Borough: Drogheda

1359–1801
- Seats: 2
- Replaced by: Drogheda (UKHC)

Drogheda was a constituency represented in the Irish House of Commons to 1801.

== History ==
There were originally two boroughs named Drogheda, lying on opposite sides of the River Boyne that forms the boundary between County Meath to the south and County Louth (or Uriel) to the north. Sometimes a writ of election was made to the two boroughs separately (Drogheda versus Uriel and Drogheda versus Midiam) and sometimes to the two jointly (Drogheda ex utraque parte aquae, "on both sides of the water"). Records of the constituency exist from 1359; it may have existed earlier. In 1412, the two boroughs were united and, together with their liberties, formed into the "county of the town of Drogheda" separate from Meath and Louth. The county of the town formed a single county borough constituency.

In the Patriot Parliament of 1689 summoned by James II, Drogheda was represented with two members.

== Members of Parliament ==
| Date | Met at | Members | Representing | Ref |
|---|---|---|---|---|
| 1369 | Dublin | Walter Miles | versus Uriel | |
| 1370 | Dublin | John Fulpot and Walter Milys | versus Uriel | |
| 1370 | Dublin | John Asshewell and John Stamen | versus Meath | |
| January 1371 | Kilkenny | Simon Tyrry and Richard Spes | versus Meath | |
| June 1371 | Ballydoyle | Adam FitzSymond and others | | |
| 1376 | | William White and Nicholas Starkey were elected to come to England to consult with the king and council about the government of Ireland and about an aid for the king. | ex utraque parte aquae | |
| 1560 | | John Weston and Robert Burnell | | |
| 1585 | Dublin | John Barnewall and Peter Nugent | County of the town | |
| 1613 | Dublin | John Blakeney and Roger Bealinge | | |
| 1635 | | Thomas Pippard and Richard Brice | | |
| 1639 | Dublin | Thomas Pippard (died and replaced 1640 by John Stanley. Stanley expelled 1642) and Richard Brice (expelled 1642 for non-attendance) | County of the town | |
| 1642 | Dublin | Sir Thomas Lucas and Worseley Batten | County of the town | |
| 1661 | Dublin | Moyses Hill and William Toxteth | County of the town | |

=== 1689–1801 ===
| Election | First MP | Second MP |
|---|---|---|
| 1689 | Henry Dowdall | Christopher Peppard FitzGeorge |
| 1692 | Charles Moore, Lord Moore | Edward Singleton |
| 1710 | Charles Moore, Lord Moore | John Graham |
| 1713 | Henry Singleton | John Graham |
| August 1717 | Henry Singleton | John Leigh (Note: Expelled in 1717) |
| 1717 | Henry Singleton | Edward Singleton |
| 1727 | Henry Singleton | William Graham |
| 1741 | Francis Leigh | William Graham |
| 1749 | Francis Leigh | John Graham |
| 1768 | Francis Leigh | William Meade (Note: Changed surname to Meade-Ogle in 1772) |
| 1776 | Sydenham Singleton | William Meade |
| 1783 | Henry Meade-Ogle | John Forbes |
| 1790 | William Meade-Ogle | John Forbes |
| 1796 | William Meade-Ogle | John Ball |
| 1798 | Edward Hardman | John Ball |
| 1801 | Succeeded by the Westminster constituency Drogheda | |
