= Richard Nevill (1743–1822) =

Irish member of parliament

Richard Nevill (1743–1822) was an Irish Member of Parliament who represented Wexford in both the Parliament of Ireland and the Parliament of the United Kingdom.

He was the eldest son of Arthur Jones-Nevill, MP for Wexford in the Irish Parliament, of Furness, County Kildare and was educated at Kilkenny School and Trinity College Dublin.

On his father's death in 1771 Nevill took over the latter's Wexford seat, representing the borough until Ireland became part of the United Kingdom in 1801. He was appointed High Sheriff of Kildare for 1773–74.

He was appointed to the sinecure position of Teller of the Irish Exchequer from 1801 to 1806 and was then restored to the position from 1807 until his death.

He continued to represent Wexford in the UK Parliament from 1802 to 1806, from 1807 to 1810, from 1811 to 1813 and from 1814 to 1819, alternating with other representatives on account of his age and health.

He died in 1822. He had married Bridget, the daughter and heiress of Henry Bowerman of Cooliney, co. Cork, and had 4 daughters. Furness was left to daughter Marianne, who sold it to the Beauman family.
