= Mullingar (Parliament of Ireland constituency) =

Pre-1801 Irish constituency

- Former borough constituency for the Irish House of Commons
- County: County Westmeath
- Borough: Mullingar

–1801
- Replaced by: Disfranchised

Mullingar was a constituency represented in the Irish House of Commons from 1612 to 1800.

== Borough ==
The constituency represented the parliamentary borough of Mullingar.

== Members of Parliament ==
- 1560 Nicholas Casey and James Reling
- 1585 Richard Casey and Redmond Pettit
- 1613–1615: Nicholas Casey and John Hammond
- 1634–1635: Edward Pettit and James Christabel
- 1639–1649: Edward Pettit (died and replaced 1642 by Sir Richard Kennedy, 2nd Baronet) and Alexander Hope (died and replaced 1642 by Oliver Wheeler)
- 1661–1666: Arthur Forbes, 1st Earl of Granard (sat for Tyrone and replaced by Sir Robert Newcomen) and James Leighe

=== 1689–1801 ===
Election	First MP	Second MP
1689 Patriot Parliament	Garrett (or Gerald) Dillon	Edmond Nugent
1692	Roger Moore	Sir Thomas Domvile, 1st Bt
1695	Roger Moore	Sir Patrick Dun
1703	Henry Edgeworth	Sir Patrick Dun
1713	Thomas Bellew	Charles Melville
1715	Thomas Bellew	Eustace Budgell
1727	Sir Arthur Acheson, 5th Bt	John Rochfort
1749	George Forbes, Viscount Forbes	John Rochfort
1761	George Forbes, Viscount Forbes	Hon. John Forbes
1765	Richard Steele	Hon. John Forbes
1768	Richard Steele	Ralph Fetherston
1769	Richard Steele	John Scott
1776	Richard Underwood	John Scott
1779	Sir Skeffington Smyth, 1st Bt	John Scott
1783	Francis Hardy	John Doyle
1799	Francis Hardy	Luke Fox
1801	Constituency disenfranchised	
