= New Ross (Parliament of Ireland constituency) =

Pre-1801 Irish constituency

- Former borough constituency for the Irish House of Commons
- County: County Wexford
- Borough: New Ross

–1801
- Replaced by: New Ross

New Ross was a constituency represented in the Irish House of Commons until its abolition on 1 January 1801.

== Members of Parliament ==
- 1376: William Rykyll and William Seymor were elected to come to England to consult with the king and council about the government of Ireland and about an aid for the king.
- 1560: Nicholas Heron and William Dormer
- 1585: Jasper Duff and William Bennett
- 1613–1615: Matthew Shee and James FitzHenry
- 1634–1635: Nicholas Dormer and Peter Rothe
- 1639–1649: Nicholas Dormer (expelled 1642) and Chichester Brook (expelled 1642)
- 1661–1666: Sir Thomas Dancer, 1st Baronet and Henry Nicholls

=== 1689–1801 ===
| Year | First member | First party | Second member | Second party |
|---|---|---|---|---|
| 1689 | Luke Dormer | | Richard Butler | |
| 1692 | Thomas Crawford | | Sir Robert Doyne | |
| 1695 | Thomas Crawford | | Francis Annesley | |
| 1703 | Thomas Crawford | | Hon. Arthur Annesley | Tory |
| 1707 | Amyas Bushe | | Hon. Arthur Annesley | Tory |
| 1711 | Amyas Bushe | | Jeffrey Paul | |
| 1713 | Edward Jones | | Jeffrey Paul | |
| 1715 | Thomas Meredyth | Tory | Edward Worth | |
| 1727 | Charles Tottenham | | John Leigh | |
| October 1759 | Charles Tottenham | | Robert Leigh | |
| November 1759 | John Tottenham | | Robert Leigh | |
| 1761 | Charles Tottenham | | Robert Leigh | |
| 1768 | Charles Tottenham | | Robert Leigh | |
| 1801 | Replaced by Westminster constituency of New Ross | | | |
