= Bannow (Parliament of Ireland constituency) =

Pre-1801 Irish constituency

- Former borough constituency for the Irish House of Commons
- County: County Wexford
- Borough: Bannow

–1801
- Replaced by: Disfranchised

Bannow was a constituency represented in the Irish House of Commons until its abolition on 1 January 1801.

== Borough ==
This constituency was the parliamentary borough of Bannow in County Wexford.

== History ==
In the Patriot Parliament of 1689 summoned by James II, Bannow was represented with two members. Following the Acts of Union 1800 the borough was disenfranchised.

== Members of Parliament ==
- 1634–1635: Pierce Neville and Walter Furlong (or Walter Stapleton)
- 1639–1649: Christopher Hollywood (expelled 1642) and Gerald Cheevers (expelled 1642)
- 1661–1666: Dr Dudley Loftus and Henry Warren

=== 1689–1801 ===
Election	First MP	Second MP
1689	Francis Plowden	Alexius Stafford
1692	Nathaniel Boyse	John Cliffe
1715	James Boyse	John Cliffe
1725	Samuel Boyse	John Cliffe
1727	Samuel Boyse	George Ogle
1730	William Harrison	George Ogle
1737	Nicholas Hume-Loftus (Note: Styled as The Honourable from 1751)	George Ogle
1747	Nicholas Hume-Loftus	Hon. Henry Loftus
1761	Henry Mitchell	Hon. Henry Loftus
1768	Charles Tottenham	Robert Hellen
1776	Henry Loftus	Nicholas Loftus Tottenham
1790	Ponsonby Tottenham	Ephraim Carroll
1798	William Loftus	Ephraim Carroll
1799	William Loftus	Robert Shaw
February 1800	William Loftus	Joseph McClean
March 1800	Thomas Prior	Joseph McClean
1801	Disenfranchised	

== Bibliography ==
- O'Hart, John (2007). The Irish and Anglo-Irish Landed Gentry: When Cromwell came to Ireland. Vol. II. Heritage Books. ISBN 978-0-7884-1927-0.
- Leigh Rayment's historical List of Members of the Irish House of Commons. Cites: Johnston-Liik, Edith Mary (2002). The History of the Irish Parliament 1692-1800 (6 volumes). Ulster Historical Foundation.
- Johnston-Liik, E. M. (2002). History of the Irish Parliament, 1692–1800., Publisher: Ulster Historical Foundation (28 Feb 2002), ISBN 1-903688-09-4
- T. W. Moody, F. X. Martin, F. J. Byrne, A New History of Ireland 1534-1691, Oxford University Press, 1978
- Leigh Rayment's historical List of Members of the Irish House of Commons. Cites: Johnston-Liik, Edith Mary (2002). The History of the Irish Parliament 1692-1800 (6 volumes). Ulster Historical Foundation.
