= Charles Loftus, 1st Marquess of Ely =

Anglo-Irish politician

The Most Honourable The Marquess of Ely KP PC (Ire)
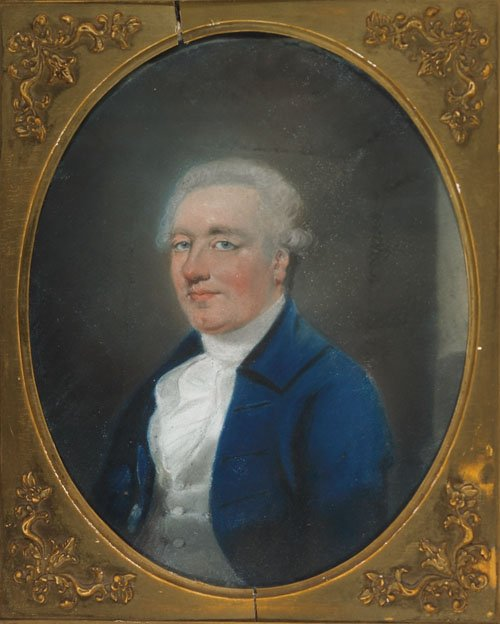

Member of the Irish House of Commons
- In office 1776–1785

Personal details
- Born: 23 January 1738
- Died: 22 March 1806 (aged 68)
- Children: John and Robert

Charles Tottenham Loftus, 1st Marquess of Ely, KP, PC (23 January 1738 – 22 March 1806) was an Anglo-Irish peer and politician.

== Life ==
Born Charles Tottenham, he assumed the additional surname of Loftus in 1783, after inheriting the estates of his uncle Henry Loftus, 1st Earl of Ely. He was the only son of Sir John Tottenham, 1st Baronet of Loftus Hall, County Wexford, (died 1786), by Henry Loftus' sister Elizabeth (died 1747).

He represented Fethard (County Wexford) in the Irish House of Commons from 1776 to 1783. In the latter year, he was elected as Member of Parliament for Wexford, a seat he held until 1785, when he was raised to the Peerage of Ireland as Baron Loftus of Loftus Hall, County Wexford. From 14 January 1789 until 1806 Loftus was one of the joint Postmasters General of Ireland. In 1789 he was furthered honoured with the title Viscount Loftus and in 1794 he was made Earl of Ely. He became Marquess of Ely on 29 December 1800 and was appointed a Knight of the Order of St Patrick on 12 December 1794. In 1801 he was made Baron Loftus of Long Loftus, Yorkshire in the Peerage of the United Kingdom, which entitled him and his successors to a seat in the House of Lords.

He married in 1766 Jane Myhill (died 1807), daughter of Robert Myhill, of Killarney, County Kilkenny, and Mary Billingsley, and had two sons, John, his heir, and Robert, Bishop of Clogher.

Parliament of Ireland
Preceded by John Tottenham; Arthur Loftus	Member of Parliament for Fethard; 1776–1783; With: Robert Hellen 1776–1779; Ponsonby Tottenham 1779–1783	Succeeded by Ephraim Carroll; Ponsonby Tottenham
Preceded by Richard Le Hunt; Richard Nevill	Member of Parliament for Wexford; 1783–1785; With: Richard Nevill	Succeeded by Richard Nevill; Francis Leigh
Peerage of Ireland
New creation	Marquess of Ely; 1800–1806	Succeeded by John Loftus
New creation	Earl of Ely; 1794–1806	Succeeded by John Loftus
New creation	Viscount Loftus; 1789–1806	Succeeded by John Loftus
New creation	Baron Loftus; 1785–1806	Succeeded by John Loftus
Peerage of the United Kingdom
New creation	Baron Loftus; 1801–1806	Succeeded by John Loftus
Baronetage of Ireland
Preceded by John Tottenham	Baronet (of Loftus Hall, Wexford); 1786–1806	Succeeded by John Loftus
