= Charles Tottenham (1716–1795) =

Irish Member of Parliament

Charles Tottenham (1716 – 10 September 1795) was an Irish Member of Parliament.

He sat in the Irish House of Commons for Fethard from 1755 to 1760, for New Ross from 1761 to 1768, for Bannow from 1768 to 1776, for Clonmines from 1776 to 1790 and again for Fethard from 1790 to his death.

He was a younger son of Charles Tottenham and his first wife Ellinor Cliffe, daughter of John Cliffe of Mulrankin, County Wexford and Barbara Carr, and younger brother of Sir John Tottenham, 1st Baronet, who married a daughter of Nicholas Loftus, 1st Viscount Loftus and was father of Charles Loftus, 1st Marquess of Ely.

Charles also married a daughter of the 1st Viscount Loftus, Anne (born 8 November 1718, died 10 November 1768). Their children included Charles Tottenham, Nicholas Loftus Tottenham and Ponsonby Tottenham, all MPs, and Elizabeth, who married Sir James Hutchinson, 2nd Baronet.

== See also ==
- Loftus Hall
