= Fethard (County Wexford) (Parliament of Ireland constituency) =

Pre-1801 Irish constituency

Fethard
- Former borough constituency for the Irish House of Commons
- County: County Wexford
- Borough: Fethard-on-Sea

1613–1801
- Replaced by: Disfranchised

Fethard was a constituency in County Wexford represented in the Irish House of Commons until its abolition on 1 January 1801.

== History ==
In the Patriot Parliament of 1689 summoned by James II, Fethard was represented with two members.

== Members of Parliament, 1613–1801 ==
- 1613–1615 Nicholas Loftus of Fethard and Richard Pemberton
- 1634–1635 Nicholas Loftus of Kildogan and Richard Parsons
- 1639–1649 Hugh Rochford (expelled) and Nicholas Stafford of Balmakatheryn (expelled)
- 1661–1666 Nicholas Loftus and Sir Nicholas Loftus

=== 1689–1801 ===
Election	First MP	Second MP
1689	James Porter	Nicholas Stafford
1692	Sir Richard Bulkeley, 2nd Bt	Dudley Loftus
1695	Sir Richard Bulkeley, 2nd Bt	Sir Nicholas Loftus
1703	Sir Richard Bulkeley, 2nd Bt	Thomas Palliser
1710	Nicholas Loftus	Thomas Palliser
1713	Hugh Morgan	Thomas Palliser
1715	Henry Ponsonby	Thomas Palliser
1727	James Stopford	George Houghton
1733	James Stopford	Philip Doyne
1755	James Stopford	Charles Tottenham
1759	Nicholas Hume-Loftus (Note: Styled as The Honourable from 1763 and as Viscount Loftus from 1766)	Charles Tottenham
1761	Nicholas Hume-Loftus	Hon. Nicholas Hume-Loftus
1764	Nicholas Hume-Loftus	William Alcock
1767	John Tottenham	William Alcock
1768	John Tottenham	Arthur Loftus
1776	Charles Tottenham (Note: Also elected for Wexford in 1783, for which he chose to sit)	Robert Hellen
1779	Charles Tottenham	Ponsonby Tottenham
1783	Ephraim Carroll	Ponsonby Tottenham
1790	Charles Tottenham	Thomas Loftus
January 1793	Charles Tottenham	Henry Hatton
1793	Charles Tottenham	Luke Fox
1796	William Loftus	Luke Fox
1798	Henry Alcock	Charles Eustace
1799	George Harrison Reade	Charles Eustace
1801	Disenfranchised	

== Bibliography ==
- O'Hart, John (2007). The Irish and Anglo-Irish Landed Gentry: When Cromwell came to Ireland. Vol. II. Heritage Books. ISBN 978-0-7884-1927-0.
- Leigh Rayment's historical List of Members of the Irish House of Commons. Cites: Johnston-Liik, Edith Mary (2002). The History of the Irish Parliament 1692-1800 (6 volumes). Ulster Historical Foundation.
