= Stephen Moore, 1st Earl Mount Cashell =

Irish landowner and politician

The Right Honourable The Earl Mont Cashell PC
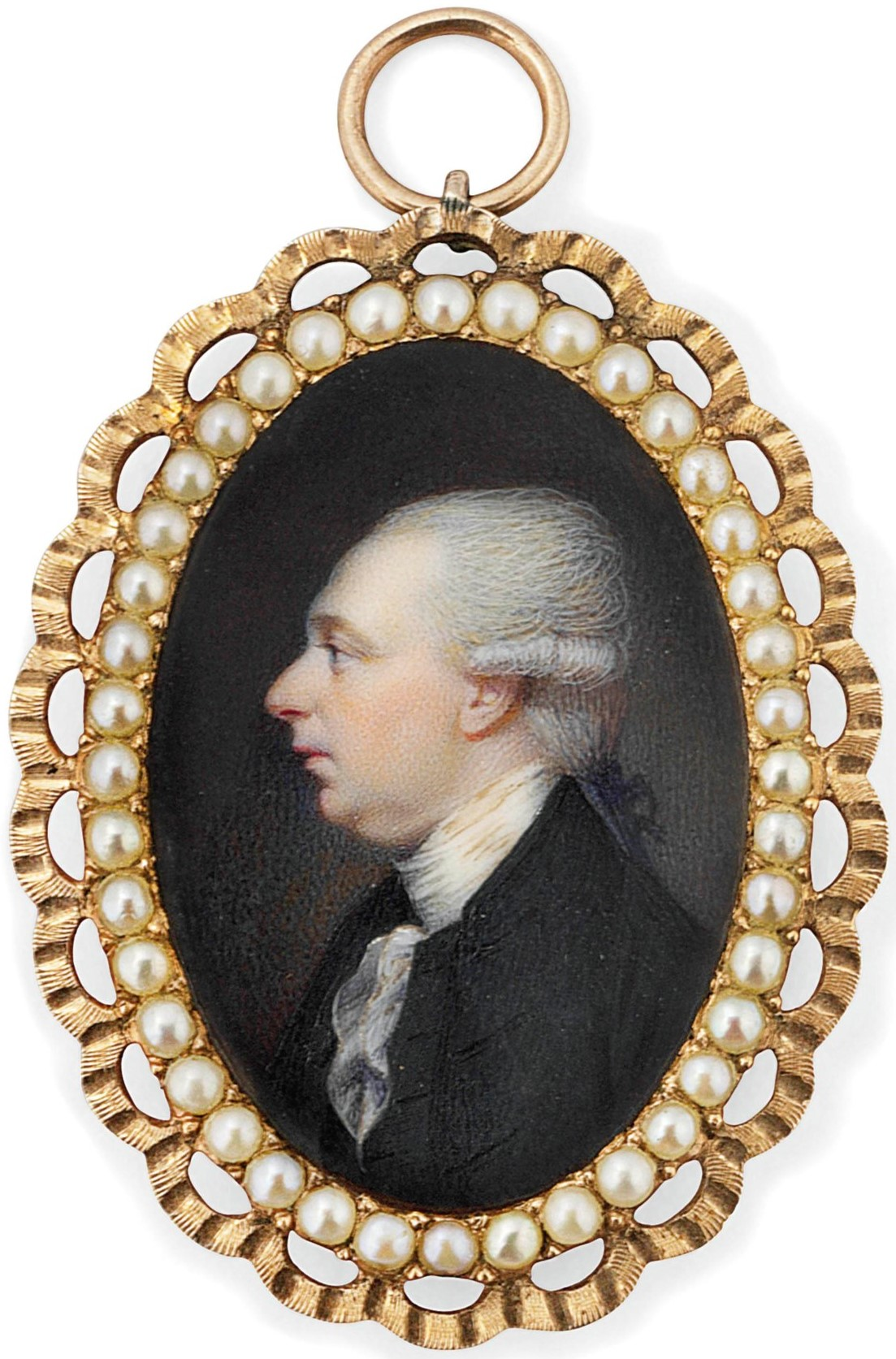
- portrait by George Engleheart

Member of Parliament for Lismore
- In office 1761–1766 Serving with Sir Henry Cavendish, Bt
- Preceded by: Richard Aldworth; Ponsonby Moore
- Succeeded by: Sir Henry Cavendish, Bt; Henry Cavendish

Personal details
- Born: Stephen Moore; 25 July 1730
- Died: 14 May 1790 (aged 59)
- Spouse: Lady Helena Rawdon (m. 1769)
- Relations: William Moore (brother)
- Children: 4, including Stephen Moore, 2nd Earl Mount Cashell
- Parent(s): Stephen Moore, 1st Viscount Mount Cashell; Alicia Colville

Stephen Moore, 1st Earl Mount Cashell PC (25 July 1730 – 14 May 1790), styled The Honourable Stephen Moore between 1764 and 1766 and known as The Viscount Mount Cashell between 1766 and 1781, was an Irish landowner and politician.

== Early life ==
Moore was the second but eldest surviving son and heir of Stephen Moore, 1st Viscount Mount Cashell and the former Alicia Colvill. His elder brother, Richard Moore, who died unmarried in 1761, represented Clonmel in the Irish Parliament. His younger brother, William Moore represented Clogher, Clonmel and St Johnstown.

His paternal grandparents were Richard Moore of Cashell and the former Hon. Elizabeth Ponsonby (daughter of William Ponsonby, 1st Viscount Duncannon). His mother was the sister and heiress of Robert Colvill and daughter of Hugh Colvill (son and heir of Rt. Hon. Sir Robert Colvill of Newtown by his third wife Rose Leslie). Galgorm Castle near Ballymena passed by inheritance to Stephen from the Colvill family, who had bought it from the Fortescue family in the 1640s, and it became one of the family's principal residences.

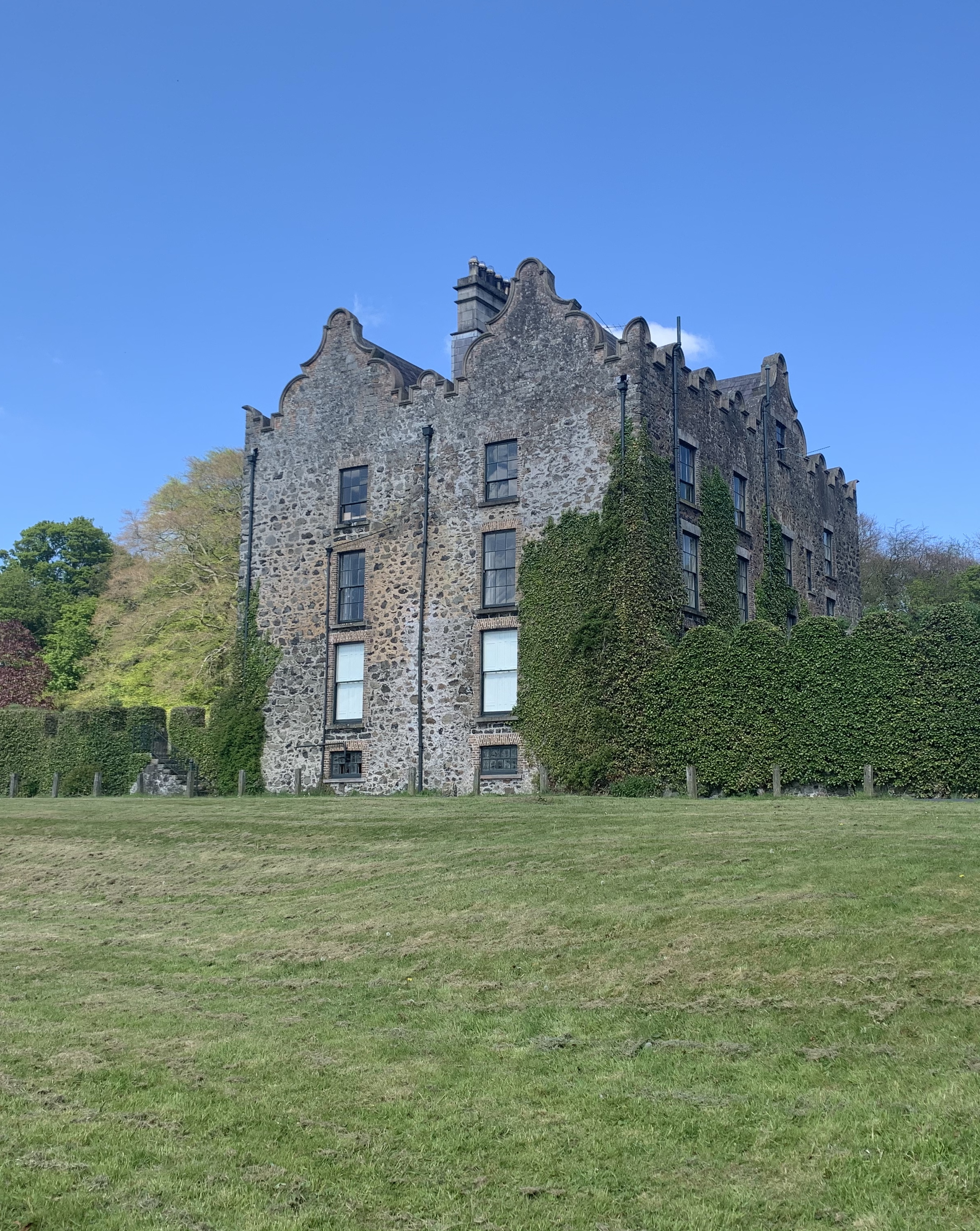
Galgorm Castle, which the Earl inherited from his mother's family

== Career ==
He was returned to the Irish House of Commons for Lismore, a seat he held until February 1766, when he succeeded his father in the viscountcy (only a month after his father was elevated to the viscountcy) and entered the Irish House of Lords. In 1781, he was created Earl Mount Cashell, of Cashell in the County of Tipperary, in the Irish peerage. In 1785, he was also sworn of the Irish Privy Council.

== Personal life ==
On 3 June 1769, Lord Mount Cashell married Lady Helena Rawdon (1744–1792), second daughter of John Rawdon, 1st Earl of Moira by his first wife Lady Helena Perceval (herself the second daughter of John Perceval, 1st Earl of Egmont). They had four children, two of whom married siblings, both children of Robert King, 2nd Earl of Kingston and his wife Caroline FitzGerald. Their children were:

- Stephen Moore, 2nd Earl Mount Cashell, who married Lady Margaret King in 1791.
- Hon. John Moore (b. 1772)
- Lady Helena Moore (1773–1847), who married George King, 3rd Earl of Kingston in 1794.
- Hon. William Moore (b. 1775)

Lord Mount Cashell died in May 1790, aged 59, and was succeeded in the earldom by his son Stephen. Lady Mount Cashell died on 3 June 1792.

=== Descendants ===
Through his eldest son and heir, he was a grandfather of Edward Moore, the Canon of Windsor. Through his daughter Lady Helena, he was a grandfather of antiquarian Edward King, Viscount Kingsborough.

Parliament of Ireland
Preceded by Richard Aldworth; Ponsonby Moore	Member of Parliament for Lismore; 1761–1766; With: Sir Henry Cavendish, Bt	Succeeded by Sir Henry Cavendish, Bt; Henry Cavendish
Peerage of Ireland
New creation	Earl Mount Cashell; 1781–1790	Succeeded by Stephen Moore
Preceded by Stephen Moore	Viscount Mount Cashell; 1766–1790	Succeeded by Stephen Moore
