= Stephen Moore, 1st Viscount Mount Cashell =

Irish politician

Stephen Moore, 1st Viscount Mount Cashell (1696 – 26 February 1766), known as The Lord Kilworth between 1764 and 1766, was an Irish politician.

== Early life ==
Moore was the son of Richard Moore, of Cashell, County Tipperary, by the Honourable Elizabeth Ponsonby, daughter of William Ponsonby, 1st Viscount Duncannon.

== Career ==
He was returned to the Irish House of Commons for County Tipperary in 1738, a seat he held until 1761. In 1764 he was raised to the Peerage of Ireland as Baron Kilworth, of Moore Park in the County of Cork. Two years later he was further honoured when he was made Viscount Mount Cashell, of the City of Cashell, also in the Irish peerage.

== Personal life ==
Lord Mount Cashell married Alicia Colville, daughter of Hugh Colville and Sarah Margetson, and granddaughter of Sir Robert Colville and his third wife Rose Leslie. They had several children, including:

- Richard Moore (1725–1761), who represented Clonmel in the Irish Parliament.
- Stephen Moore, 1st Earl Mount Cashell (1730–1790), who married Lady Helena Rawdon, second daughter of John Rawdon, 1st Earl of Moira and Lady Helena Perceval (the second daughter of the 1st Earl of Egmont).
- Hon. William Moore (1743–1810), who represented Clogher, Clonmel and St Johnstown.
- Hon. Elizabeth Moore, who married Hon. Ponsonby Moore, a younger son of Edward Moore, 5th Earl of Drogheda, in 1768.
- Hon. Mary Moore, who married William O'Brien, 4th Earl of Inchiquin

Lord Mount Cashell died in February 1766 (only a month after being elevated to the viscountcy) and was succeeded by his eldest surviving son, Stephen, who was created Earl Mount Cashell in 1781.

Parliament of Ireland
| Preceded by George Mathew; Nehemiah Donnellan | Member of Parliament for County Tipperary; 1738–1761; With: Nehemiah Donnellan | Succeeded by Henry Prittie; Sir Thomas Maude, Bt |
Peerage of the United Kingdom
| New creation | Viscount Mount Cashell; January–February 1766 | Succeeded by Stephen Moore |
| New creation | Baron Kilworth; 1764–1766 | Succeeded by Stephen Moore |
