= Alexander Colville =

Alexander Colville may refer to:

- Alex Colville, Canadian painter and printmaker
- Alexander Colville, 7th Lord Colville of Culross, Royal Navy admiral
- Alexander Colville (clergyman), Scottish-born clergyman in Ulster
- Alexander Colville (principal), Church of Scotland minister and principal of St Andrews University
