= Alexander Colville (clergyman) =

Scottish-born clergyman and landowner in Ireland (c.1597-c.1679)

Alexander Colville (c. 1597 - c. 1679) was a Scottish-born clergyman in seventeenth-century Ulster, who became a wealthy landowner in the province.

== Life ==
He was probably a cousin of James Colville, 1st Lord Colville of Culross, and was also a close relative of Robert Echlin, Bishop of Down and Connor, whose mother was Grizel Colville of Kinross, and who furthered Alexander's career. He was educated at the University of St Andrews, where he took his MA. He was ordained in 1622 and became a Doctor of Divinity in 1636.

He moved to Ireland, and under the patronage of his kinsman Bishop Echlin, he became rector of Skerry and Rathcavan in County Antrim, precentor of the Diocese of Down and Connor, (where his cousin was Bishop) and prebendary of Cairncastle in Antrim. By means which have never been fully explained, he acquired great wealth, and in the 1640s he purchased Galgorm Castle in Antrim from Sir Faithful Fortescue. He made some improvements to the castle, which became the main family residence.

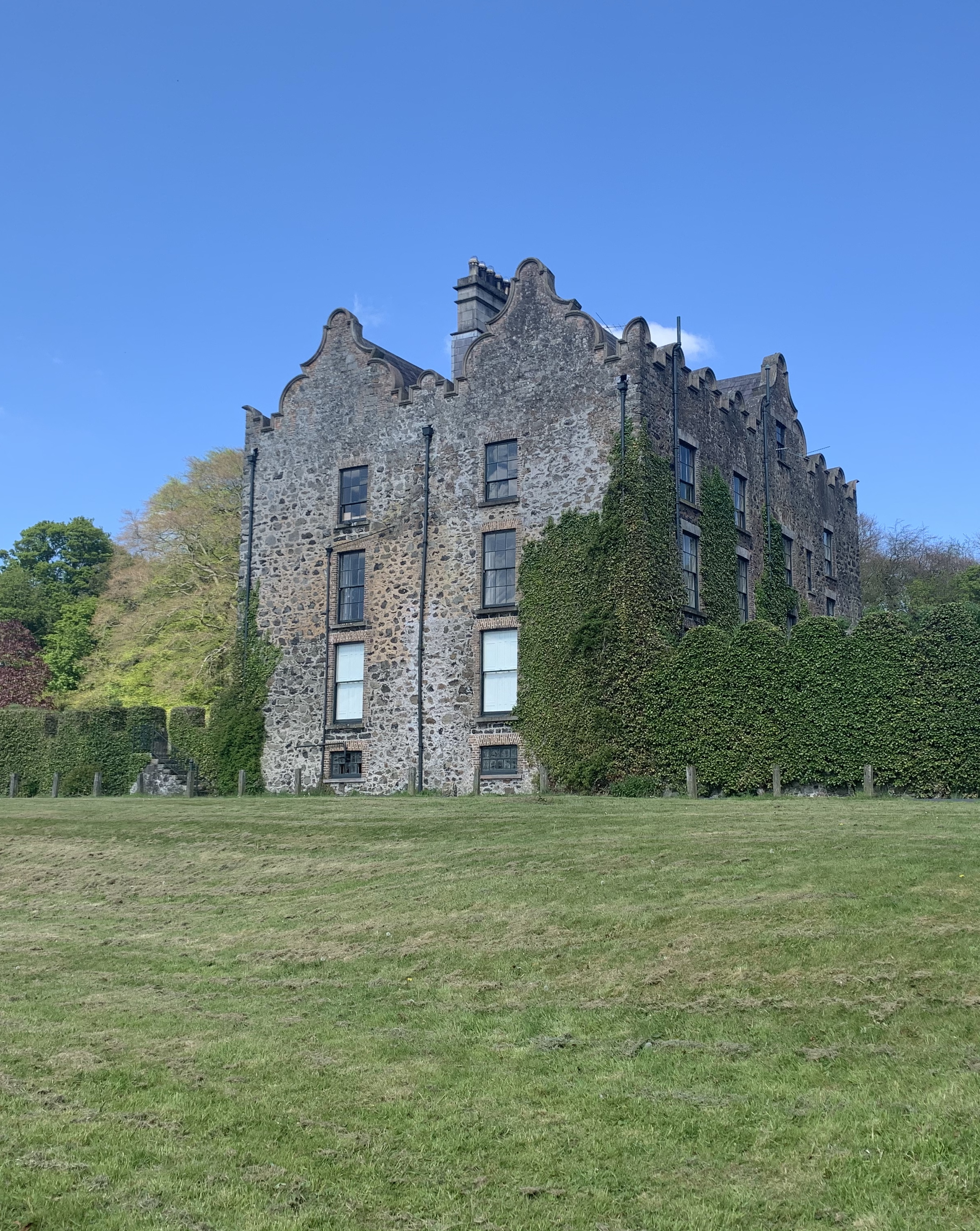
Galgorm Castle, which Colville bought from the Fortescue family in the 1640s

He was not a popular man, and his increasing wealth attracted much envious gossip. Unwilling to admit that he was simply a shrewd man of business, his enemies maintained that he was in league with the Devil, and had later contrived to cheat him out of a roomful of gold. A former servant in Colville's house, who was charged with witchcraft, insisted that she had learned the dark arts from her employer.

In fact, so far from being a Satanist, Colville was a sincere Anglican and a convinced supporter of episcopacy, in contrast to his wife, who was a Presbyterian. Since the Church of Ireland, especially in Ulster, leaned increasingly towards Presbyterianism, this led to bitter clashes between Colville and many of his clerical colleagues, who unsuccessfully sought his excommunication.

According to his entry in the Dictionary of Irish Biography, Colville "may have died in 1670 [..and..] was certainly dead by 1679". He was succeeded in his estates by his only son, Sir Robert Colville, a member of the Irish House of Commons and the Privy Council of Ireland. Robert by four wives had numerous descendants, including Earl Mount Cashell and the Earl of Clanwilliam.

== Family ==
He was cousin to his namesake Alexander Colville and because of their similar dates and backgrounds may be confused.

Little is known of Alexander Colville's wife, except that she differed from her husband on religious issues, and tried to persuade her son to embrace the Presbyterian tradition.
