= George William Tighe =

Irish agricultural theorist (1776–1837)

- Born: 25 February 1776
- Died: 1 March 1837 (aged 61) Pisa, Grand Duchy of Tuscany (now Italy)

George William Tighe (25 February 1776 – March 1837) was an Irish agricultural theorist who spent much of his life in Italy. Through his marriage to Margaret King, he exerted an influence on the radical poet Percy Bysshe Shelley.

== Family background ==
George William Tighe was the son of Edward Tighe, an Irish lawyer, writer and politician, and his wife Ann Jones from Co. Westmeath. Edward's siblings included other MPs, Theodosia Blachford, a prominent Methodist, and Rev. Thomas Tighe, who was instrumental in helping the young Patrick Bronte, The poet Mary Tighe was one of George's cousins.

== Scientific career ==
A scholar of Claire Clairmont's life characterises Tighe as achieving "some degree of fame for his agricultural writings".

As an Irishman, he took his interest in potatoes abroad. While living in Italy, he had samples of the tubers sent to him from various regions, concluding gloomily that they were all of the same variety.

He had a copy of Humphry Davy's Elements of Agricultural Chemicals which he apparently lent to Percy Bysshe Shelley, captivating the young traveller's attention for a week of study.

== Life with Margaret King ==
Tighe was living in Rome when he met the aristocrat, who was visiting the city with her then husband, the 2nd Earl Mountcashell, accompanied by her friend the memoirist Katherine Wilmot. They began a passionate affair around 1803 which continued until her death at Pisa in January 1835. Lady Mountcashell remained with her husband, however, until 1805 when he left her in Germany. Lord and Lady Mountcashell did not legally separate until 1821, by which time she had been living with Tighe for almost 20 years. Around 1806, Tighe and Lady Mountcashell moved to Jena where she was to assume the guise of a man to study medicine. Sometime later they then moved to live in Pisa where she studied under Andrea Vaccá Berlinghieri, at the University of Pisa. The couple remained at Pisa until their deaths.

Tighe and Lady Mountcashell lived together at Casa Silva, Pisa under the name of "Mr and Mrs Mason". The name comes from the only children's book written by the pioneer educator and proto-feminist Mary Wollstonecraft, who served as Margaret King's governess and inspired great devotion. Some of Wollstonecraft's experiences during this year made their way into Original Stories from Real Life (1788). The maternal teacher who frames these stories is called Mrs Mason.

== The Shelleys and Byron ==
The Masons lived in Pisa with their daughters Lauretta and Nerina. They were visited in 1820 by a young threesome: the poet Percy Shelley, his wife the writer Mary Shelley (daughter of Godwin and Wollstonecraft, and already author of Frankenstein), and their translator her stepsister Claire Clairmont. "Mrs Mason" felt maternal towards the women, as they were both in a sense daughters of her life-changing motherly governess. She offered "sage advice" to Shelley about his health and to Clairmont about her career. She introduced them all to a new intellectual and social circle in Pisa, and helped Mary set up her household, finding them pleasant lodgings and advising on servants. Tighe provided Percy Shelley with a great deal of material on chemistry, biology, and statistics. The Masons inspired the Shelleys with "a new-found sense of radicalism".

In 1821, Tighe became involved in the attempts of Clairmont to remove Allegra, her daughter by Lord Byron, from a convent in Ravenna. Tighe made a "secret trip to Ravenna and Bagnacavallo to find out what he could about the convent and Allegra's treatment there". Byron scholar Leslie A. Marchand mentions that around the same time, an "orphan girl named Elizabeth Parker", living in the Masons' household, seems to have shared Tighe's poor opinion of Lord Byron.

== Later life and death ==
Tighe outlived his wife by two years before dying at Pisa in March 1837. They are both buried in the Old English Cemetery, Livorno (then known in English as Leghorn). A copy of Tighe's will is held in The National Archives at Kew. This received English probate on 22 August 1837 as Tighe remained an Irish citizen at his death.

== Marriage ==
Lady Mount Cashell left her husband, Stephen Moore, 2nd Earl Mountcashell, for Tighe circa 1803. Although it is suggested that Tighe and Lady Mountcashell were married circa 1822, her grave inscription refers to her as "Margaret Jane MOUNTCASHELL, née KING".

== Family ==
Tighe and Margaret King had two daughters:

- Anna Laura Georgina "Laurette" Tighe, (1809–1880) wrote under the pseudonym "Sara". She married twice, to Adolphe Dominique Galloni d’Istria in 1831, and to Placido Tardy in 1853.
- Catherine Elizabeth Raniera "Nerina", (1815–1874) married Bartomoleo Cini.
