= George Pinckard =

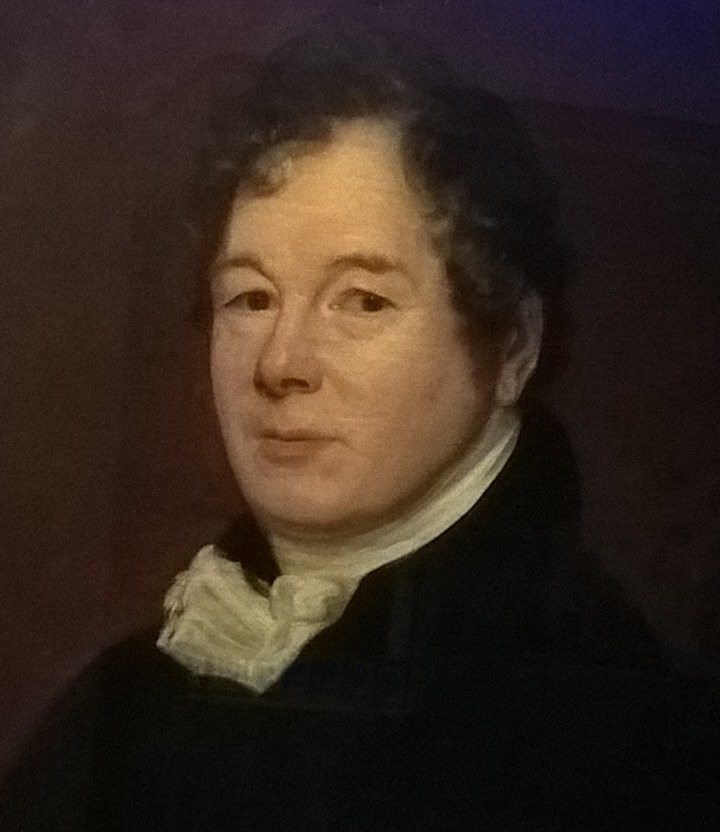
Portrait at the Museum on the Mound, Edinburgh

George Pinckard M.D. (1768–1835) was an English physician, known as an author, an abolitionist, and in the field of insurance.

== Life ==
The son of Henry Pinckard of Handley Hall, Northamptonshire, he was tutored by a clerical relative, studied medicine first at the then united hospitals of St. Thomas's and Guy's, then at Edinburgh, and finally at Leyden, where he graduated M.D. on 20 June 1792. He resided afterwards for a short time with his brother and sister at Copet, near Geneva, and witnessed the capture of the city by the French forces under General Montesquieu.

On 30 September 1794 Pinckard was admitted a licentiate of the College of Physicians of London. In October 1795 he was appointed a physician to the forces, and accompanied Sir Ralph Abercromby's expedition to the West Indies. He was on the Santo Domingo staff, and had numerous delays before starting, during which he made the acquaintance of James Lind, then in charge of Haslar Hospital. He reached Barbados in February 1796.

Pinckard was in Ireland during the Irish Rebellion of 1798, and served on the staff of General Samuel Hulse. He was promoted for his services to the rank of deputy inspector-general of hospitals, and had part of the direction of the medical service in the Duke of York's expedition to Den Helder. On his return he took a house in Great Russell Street, then moved to Bloomsbury Square, London, and resided there till his death. He established the Bloomsbury Dispensary, and was physician to it for thirty years. In 1823 he formulated the idea of insuring lives beyond the normal bounds, from a medical standpoint, leading to the foundation in 1824 of Clerical Medical. He was chairman and a director from its foundation in 1824 to his death in 1835.

Pinckard suffered from angina pectoris, and died while writing a prescription for a patient in his consulting-room on 15 May 1835.

== Works ==
In his Notes on the West Indies (3 vols. 1806; 2nd ed. 2 vols. 1816), Pinckard described his experiences in the West Indies and Guiana, particularly of slavery. Passages from this work were reprinted by abolitionists in 1807. In 1808 he published Dr. Pinckard's Case of Hydrophobia, from Chipping Barnet in Hertfordshire. He subsequently published in the London Medical Journal two other cases of hydrophobia, and reprinted all three, with another, in a pamphlet entitled Cases of Hydrophobia (1819), dedicated to John Latham. In April 1835 he published Suggestions for restoring the Moral Character and the Industrious Habits of the Poor; also for establishing District Work-farms in place of Parish Workhouses, and for reducing the Poor-rates. He recommended farms laid out for the purpose by the spade-labour of paupers.

== Notes ==
Attribution

This article incorporates text from a publication now in the public domain: Lee, Sidney, ed. (1896). "Pinckard, George". Dictionary of National Biography. Vol. 45. London: Smith, Elder & Co.
