= St Mary's College, St Andrews =

College of the University of St Andrews, Scotland

St Mary's College
- Latin: Collegium Sanctae Mariae
- Motto: Latin: In principio erat verbum
- Motto in English: In the Beginning was the Word
- Type: College
- Established: 1538; 488 years ago
- Affiliations: University of St Andrews
- Principal: William Tooman
- Students: 98
- Undergraduates: 60
- Postgraduates: 50
- Location: St Andrews, Fife, Scotland; 56.3391°N 2.7945°W
- Teaching staff: 25
Colours
- Website: www.st-andrews.ac.uk/divinity/

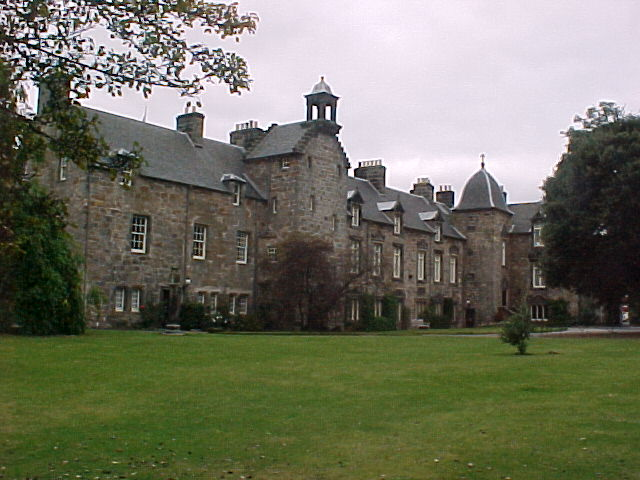
St Mary's College

St Mary's College, founded as New College or College of the Assumption of the Blessed Virgin Mary, is the home of the Faculty and School of Divinity within the University of St Andrews, in Fife, Scotland.

== History ==
The college was founded in 1538 by Archbishop James Beaton, uncle of Cardinal David Beaton on the site of the Pedagogy or St John's College (founded 1418).. Archbishop John Hamilton is considered a co-founder of the college due the subsequent work on extension and completion he sponsored in the late 1550's.

St Mary's College was intended to preserve the teachings of the Catholic church against the Protestant teachings of the reformers. It was dedicated to a revival of learning on the Continental trilingual model and from the outset laid emphasis on the knowledge of Latin, Greek and Hebrew. In 1579, nineteen years after the Reformation brought fundamental changes to the religious life of the Scottish nation, St Mary's College was reconstituted, under the influence of Andrew Melville, as the Faculty of Divinity of the university.

At its foundation in 1538 St Mary's was intended to be a College for instruction in Divinity, Law, and Medicine, as well as in Arts, but its career on this extensive scale was short-lived. Under a new foundation and erection, confirmed by Parliament in 1579, it was set apart for the study of Theology only, and it has remained a Divinity College ever since. From 1580 onwards each Principal has acted as primarius Professor of Divinity, or first Master.

St Mary's College retains much of its original sixteenth-century buildings, specifically the north and West ranges. The Quad contains a thorn tree said to have been planted by Mary, Queen of Scots, during her many visits to St. Andrews. The Quad also contains the historic King James Library founded by King James VI & I in 1612. In addition, the College has The Roundel, a 16th-century building dedicated for doctoral students studying divinity at the University of St Andrews.

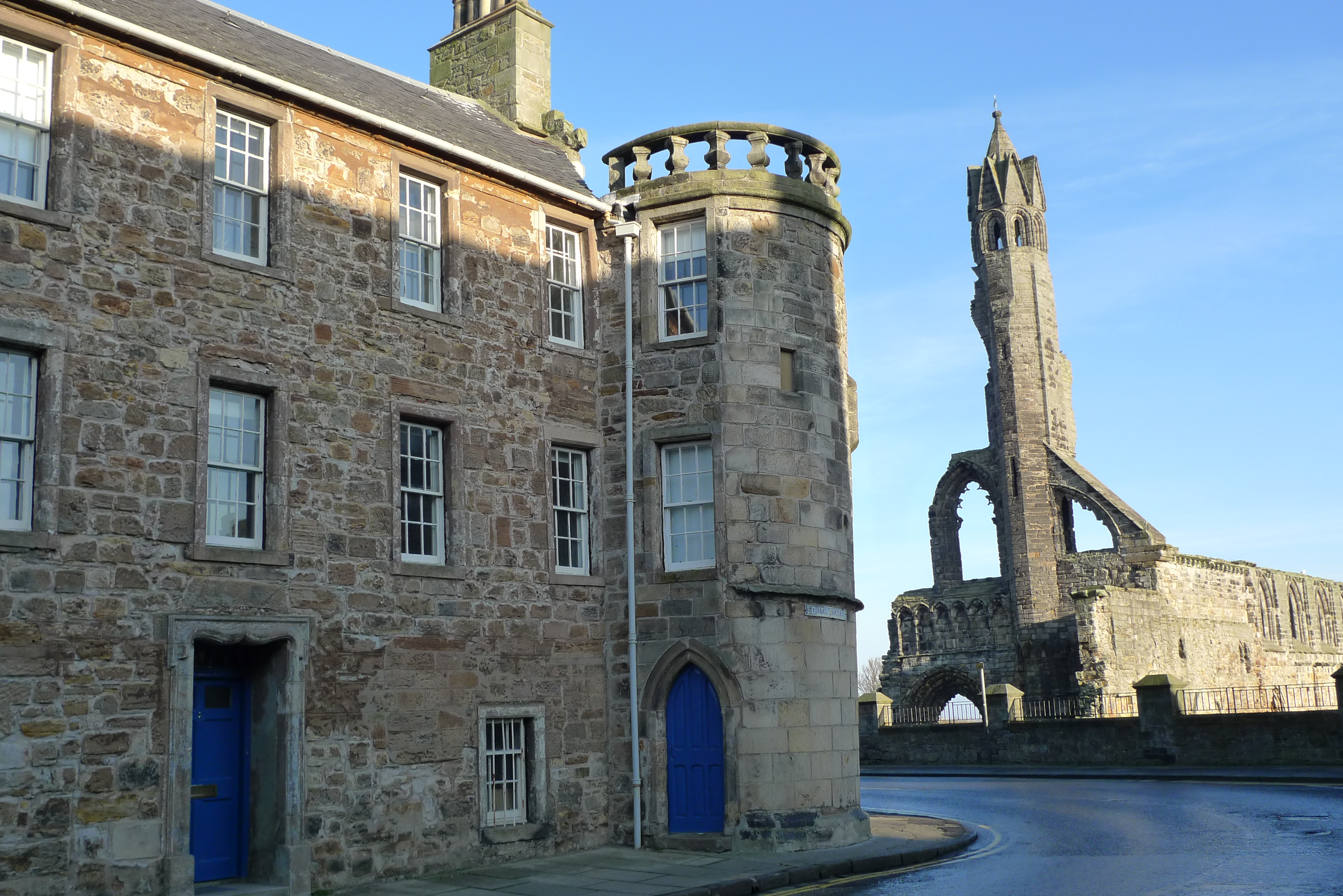
The Roundel

The college is currently one of five approved centres for the training of Church of Scotland ministers. Graduates include the Very Rev Dr Finlay Macdonald, a former Principal Clerk to the General Assembly of the Church of Scotland and a Moderator.

Beginning May 2018, the Principal of St Mary's College was Rev. Dr. Stephen Holmes, also Head of the School of Divinity, who replaced Ian Bradley (Professor Emeritus). Oliver Crisp was Principal and Head of School from January 2022 until July 2024 after previously having been Acting Head of the School of Divinity since October 2021. Since the summer of 2024 William Tooman has been Principal and Head of School.

== Rankings ==
As of May 2015, the Faculty and School of Divinity forms an academic community of some 131 persons: 16 members of staff; 55 postgraduate students; and 60 undergraduates. According to The Complete University Guide 2016, the School of Divinity is placed first in the United Kingdom for undergraduate studies ahead of Durham in second place and Cambridge in third. In the 2016 Guardian University Guide, it is also ranked first in the United Kingdom in religious studies and theology.

== Centres ==
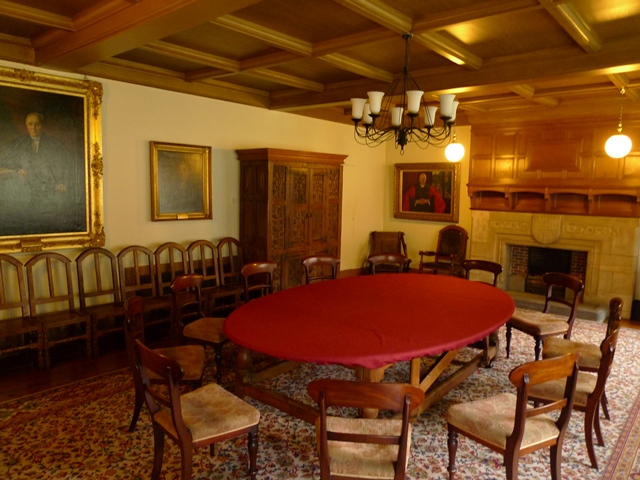
College Hall, St Mary's College

The college has four research centres.

The Institute for Theology, Imagination and the Arts (ITIA) was founded within the college by professors Trevor Hart and Jeremy Begbie (currently Thomas A. Langford Research Professor at Duke Divinity School) in 2000. It "aims to advance and enrich an active conversation between Christian theology and the arts – bringing rigorous theological thinking to the arts, and bringing the resources of the arts to the enterprise of theology." The current director is Dr Gavin Hopps.

The Centre for the Study of Religion and Politics (CSRP) was founded in November 2004 by a group of academics attached to the Schools of Divinity, International Relations, Modern Languages, and Philosophical and Anthropological Studies. The need for a centre of learning to consider the role of religion and politics was highlighted by the support garnered from a diverse range of scholars and religious and political figures who endorsed the Centre's establishment. These supporters who have continued as Patrons of the Centre include Gustavo Gutiérrez, Cardinal O'Brien, Bishop Desmond Tutu, Carole Hillenbrand, Ian Linden, Julian Filochowski, J.D.Y. Peel, Rev Joel Edwards, Professor George P. Smith II and Dr. P.T.W. Baxter. The current director is Professor Mario Aguilar

The Institute for Bible, Theology & Hermeneutics (IBTH) was established in 2009 to give formal identity to the long-standing project of research into Scripture and theology that has been associated with the work at St Mary's School of Divinity. The institute introduces its aims as seeking, "To overcome the sense of fragmentation within the field of Divinity that burdens many within the Academy, promoting intra-disciplinary conversation between Biblical Studies and the various fields of Theology, thus providing a core identity for a more integrated discipline competent to engage in inter-disciplinary research. With the study of general hermeneutical theory and practice at its centre, it will be outward-looking and keen to engage with issues arising from the contemporary world." The current director is Dr Mark Elliott.

The Logos Institute for Analytic and Exegetical Theology was founded in 2016 by Professor Alan Torrance and Dr Andrew Torrance. The Institute "is committed to scholarship that reflects a concern for: transparency; simplicity in expression; clear, logical argumentation; and rigorous analysis. It also reflects a radical commitment to interdisciplinary engagement, particularly between the fields of philosophy, theology, biblical studies, and the sciences. Its faculty consists of world-leading scholars in the fields of biblical studies, theology, and philosophy." The Logos Institute is currently co-directed by Profs. Oliver Crisp and Andrew Torrance.

== Faculty ==
Principals
Name	Years served
Robert Bannerman	1539–1546
Archibald Hay	1546–1547
John Douglas	1547-1574
Andrew Melville	1580–1607
Robert Howie	1607–1647
Samuel Rutherford	1647–1661
Alexander Colville	1662–1666
James Hadow	1707–1747
John Tulloch	1854–1886
John Cunningham	1886–1893
Ian Bradley	2014–2017
Stephen Holmes	2018–2021
Oliver D. Crisp	2022–2023
William Tooman	2024–Present

1643 Chair of Divinity
Name	Years served
Samuel Rutherford	1643–1661
James Sharp	1661–1679
Thomas Halyburton	1710–1712
Trevor Hart	1995–2013
John Webster	2013–2016
Christoph Schwöbel	2018–2021
Marcus Plested	2026-present

Other notable faculty

- John Black (martyr), Roman Catholic martyr, Second Master
- Allan Menzies Professor of Biblical Criticism 1869 to 1916
- David Brown (theologian) Wardlaw Professor of Theology, Imagination, and the Arts, 2007 to 2015, now Emeritus Professor
- N.T. Wright Research Professor (New Testament), 2010 to 2019
- Alan Torrance, Emeritus Professor of Systematic Theology and founder of the Logos Institute for Analytic and Exegetical Theology
