= Mario Aguilar (academic) =

Chair of religion and politics

Mario Ignacio Aguilar FRAS FRSA FRAI
- Born: 10 March 1959 (age 67); Chile
- Awards: Adèle Mellen Prize (2004)

Academic background
- Education: University of London

Academic work
- Institutions: University of St Andrews

Mario Ignacio Aguilar FRAS FRSA FRAI (born 10 March 1959) is the Chair of Religion and Politics at the School of Divinity (St. Mary's College) of the University of St Andrews, Scotland.

== Biography ==
He completed his PhD in Anthropology at the School of Oriental and African Studies, University of London. Since joining the University of St Andrews in 1994, he has held various positions including, Dean of Divinity (2002-2005). Aguilar is also the current director and a founding director of the Centre for the Study of Religion and Politics (known as the CSRP) based within St Mary's, and the centre only accepts PhD researchers. He is also the coordinator of the Scholars at the Peripheries Research Group.

Aguilar's research includes what is considered to be the largest study of its kind, a ten-year research project (2007-2017) on religion and politics in Tibet. The project reflects on the challenges that will be faced by the 15th Dalai Lama and how "Tibetans are going to manage religion and politics as two geographically separated entities within a Tibetan Buddhist practice that incorporates past histories and a Tibetan region that remains part of contemporary China." In addition in July 2012 De Gruyter announced the engagement of Aguilar as the general editor of a three volume Handbook on Liberation Theology.

== Other Appointments and Responsibilities ==
- Representative of the Royal Africa Society, Scotland, to the University of St Andrews.
- Chair of Ritual Studies of the American Academy of Religion.
- Member of the International African Institute.
- Fellow of the Royal Anthropological Institute.
- Fellow of the Royal Asiatic Society
- Fellow of the Royal Society of Arts

== Selected publications ==
- Women’s Organizing Abilities: Two Case Studies in Kenya and Malawi, with Laurel Birch de Aguilar. Washington, DC: ODII, 1993.
- Ministry to Social and Religious Outcasts in Africa. Eldoret, Kenya: AMECEA Gaba Publications, 1995.
- Dios en Africa: Elementos para una Antropología de la Religión. Estella, Navarra (Spain): Editorial Verbo Divino, 1997.
- Being Oromo in Kenya. Trenton, NJ: Africa World Press, 1998.
- The Rwanda Genocide and the Call to Deepen Christianity in Africa. Eldoret, Kenya: AMECEA Gaba Publications, 1998.
- The Politics of Age and Gerontocracy in Africa: Ethnographies of the Past and Memories of the Present, ed. Trenton, NJ: Africa World Press, 1998.
- Recent Advances and Issues in Anthropology. Westport, CT: Greenwood Press, 2000.
- Current Issues on Theology and Religion in Latin America and Africa. Lewiston, NY; Lampeter, UK: Edwin Mellen Press, 2002.
- A Social History of the Catholic Church in Chile, 9 Vols. Lewiston, NY; Lampeter, UK: Edwin Mellen Press, 2004–. Winner of the Adèle Mellen Prize (2004).
- Cardenal Raúl Silva Henríquez: presencia en la vida de Chile (1907-1999). Santiago: Copygraph, 2004.
- Anthropology and Biblical Studies: Avenues of Approach, edited with L.J. Lawrence. Leiden: Deo Publishing, 2004.
- Rethinking Age in Africa: Colonial, Postcolonial and Contemporary Interpretations of Cultural Representations, ed. Trenton, N.J.: Africa World Press, 2007.
- The History and Politics of Latin American Theology, 3 Vols. London: SCM Press, 2007-2008.
- Contemplating God, Changing the World. London: SPCK, 2008.
- A las puertas de la Villa Grimaldi: Poemas. Santiago: Caliope Editores, 2008.
- Theology, Liberation, Genocide: A Theology of the Periphery. London: SCM Press, 2009.
- The Politics of God in East Africa: Oromo Ritual and Religion. Trenton, N.J.: Africa World Press, 2009.
- Retorno a la Villa Grimaldi. Santiago: Caliope Ediciones, 2009.
- Pausas: Poemas de Villa Grimaldi an India. Santiago: Mago Ediciones, 2009.
- Manifiesto del Bicentenario: Poemas. Santiago: Caliope Ediciones y Kawell Kelun Editores, 2009.
- Thomas Merton: Contemplation and Political Action. London: SPCK, 2011.
- A History of the Lamas in Tibet 1391-2006. Lewinston, NY; Lampeter, UK: Edwin Mellen Press, 2012.
- Church, Liberation and World Religions. London: T&T Clark, 2012.
- The Way of the Hermit: Interfaith Encounters in Silence and Prayer. London; Philadelphia: Jessica Kingsley Publishers, 2017.
- Interreligious Dialogue and the Partition of India: Hindus and Muslims in Dialogue about Violence and Forced Migration. London; Philadelphia: Jessica Kingsley Publishers, 2018.
- After Pestilence: An Interreligious Theology of the Poor. London: SCM Press, 2021.
- Pope Francis: Journeys of a Peacemaker. Abingdon: Routledge, 2021.
- The 14th Dalai Lama: Peacekeeping and Universal Responsibility. Routledge, 2021.
