= Robert Colville (Irish MP) =

Irish politician

Sir Robert Colville (c.1625–1697) was a wealthy Irish landowner and politician.

== Background and early career ==
Colville was probably born in Ardquin, County Down, the eldest son of Dr. Alexander Colville, and educated at Trinity College Dublin.

His father, a clergyman who was born in Scotland, came to Ireland in the 1620s and, by means which have never been explained, acquired great wealth. The most likely explanation for his accumulation of riches is that he was simply a sharp man of business, but gossip attributed his good fortune to his dealings with the Devil (whom he reportedly cheated). His main residence was Galgorm Castle near Ballymena, County Antrim, which he bought from Sir Faithful Fortescue in about 1645. He was almost certainly a relative of Robert Echlin, Bishop of Down and Connor, whose mother was Grizel Colville of Kinross. Not much appears to be known of Robert's mother, although we do know that she openly professed the Presbyterian tradition; her son is said to have had mixed religious feelings, moving in middle age from Presbyterianism to conformity with Anglicanism, while retaining a certain sympathy for his mother's beliefs. His father on the other hand was a lifelong opponent of Presbyterianism, and the lurid stories about his necromancy probably originated with those of his enemies who belonged to that tradition.

During the English Civil War Robert served as an army captain; hence the frequent references to him in his middle years as "Captain Colville". Over the years he steadily added to the family fortune and estates. He made Newton House, Newtownards, his main residence, having acquired it from the Earl of Mount Alexander. He made major alterations to Newtown House, at great expense. He became rather unpopular with his neighbours, who resented his increasing wealth and political influence, as his father had been resented in his own lifetime. He inherited his father's estates about 1579 (some accounts put it at 1670). He wielded great political influence in County Down, serving as High Sheriff of Antrim in 1670 and receiving a knighthood in 1676. Throughout his career, he lobbied vigorously for a peerage, but despite being promised a title on at least two occasions he never received one.

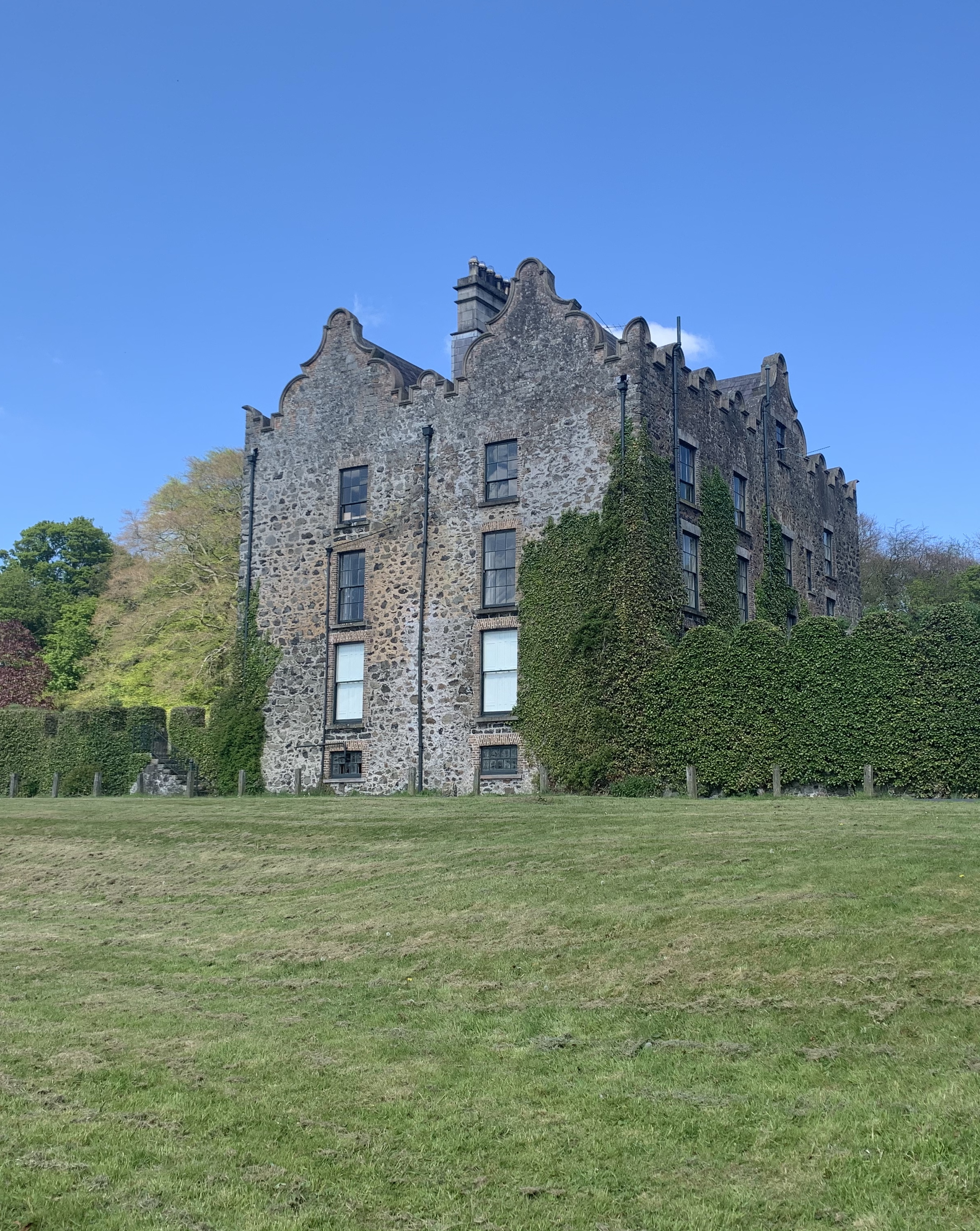
Galgorm Castle, which Robert's father bought c.1645, and where he grew up

== Politics ==
Colville represented Hillsborough in the House of Commons from 1661 to 1666; then he represented County Antrim from 1695 until his death in 1697. He was appointed a member of the Privy Council of Ireland in 1678. During the crisis year 1688/9, although he had quarrelled with James II of England, he initially urged a policy of conciliation, rather than actively seeking to overthrow James. His advice is said to have been unwelcome to his neighbours, many of whom disliked him. Later he declared unequivocally for William III of Orange, raising a troop to fight for him from among his own tenants, and allowing William's generals to use Galgorm Castle as their military headquarters. As a result, he was proscribed by the Patriot Parliament, and moved briefly to England, where he was one of the gentlemen chosen to address the House of Lords on the state of Ireland.

After William's triumph Colville resumed his leading role in the political life of Ulster until his death in 1697, and in his last years was a useful Government supporter in the Irish House of Commons.

== Family ==
He married four times and had issue by at least two of his wives. His first wife (whom he married in December 1651) was Penelope Rawdon, daughter of Major Rawdon, who was probably a relative of the Earl of Moira. The Major noted in a letter to Lord Conway, the Marshal of the Irish Army, dated 26 November 1651: "my daughter Pen will make a wedding with Captain Colville in ten to twelve days".

His second wife was Honora O'Hara, daughter of Thady O'Hara of Ballymena. His third wife (whom he married in 1676) was Rose Leslie, daughter of William Leslie and granddaughter of Henry Leslie, Bishop of Meath. She died in 1693. His fourth wife, whom he married before 1697, was Olivia St George, daughter of Sir Oliver St George, 1st Baronet of Carrickdrumrusk and Olivia Beresford. She outlived him and made two further marriages. She died either in 1722 or 1724.

His children were probably all born to Penelope or Rose. At least seven reached adulthood, including:

- William;
- Francis, who died prematurely in about 1683; he had married Dorothy Temple, daughter of Sir John Temple, Attorney General for Ireland, and Jane Yarner;
- Penelope, the first wife of Sir Robert Adair of Ballymena Castle (her husband, like her father, married four times);
- Elizabeth, who was the first wife of Sir Ralph Gore, 4th Baronet;
- Anne, who was the first wife of Sir Maurice Eustace MP of Harristown, County Kildare;
- Rose, who married John Hawkins-Magill of Gill Hall, Dromore, County Down: she was the grandmother of the great heiress Theodosia Meade, Countess of Clanwilliam;
- Hugh, who like his father before him was MP for Antrim County. He married Sarah Margetson (died 1733), later Countess of Bessborough, granddaughter of James Margetson, Archbishop of Armagh. Hugh was the maternal grandfather of Stephen Moore, 1st Earl Mount Cashell, who inherited Galgorm Castle from his mother Alicia Colville.
