= Stephen Moore, 3rd Earl Mount Cashell =

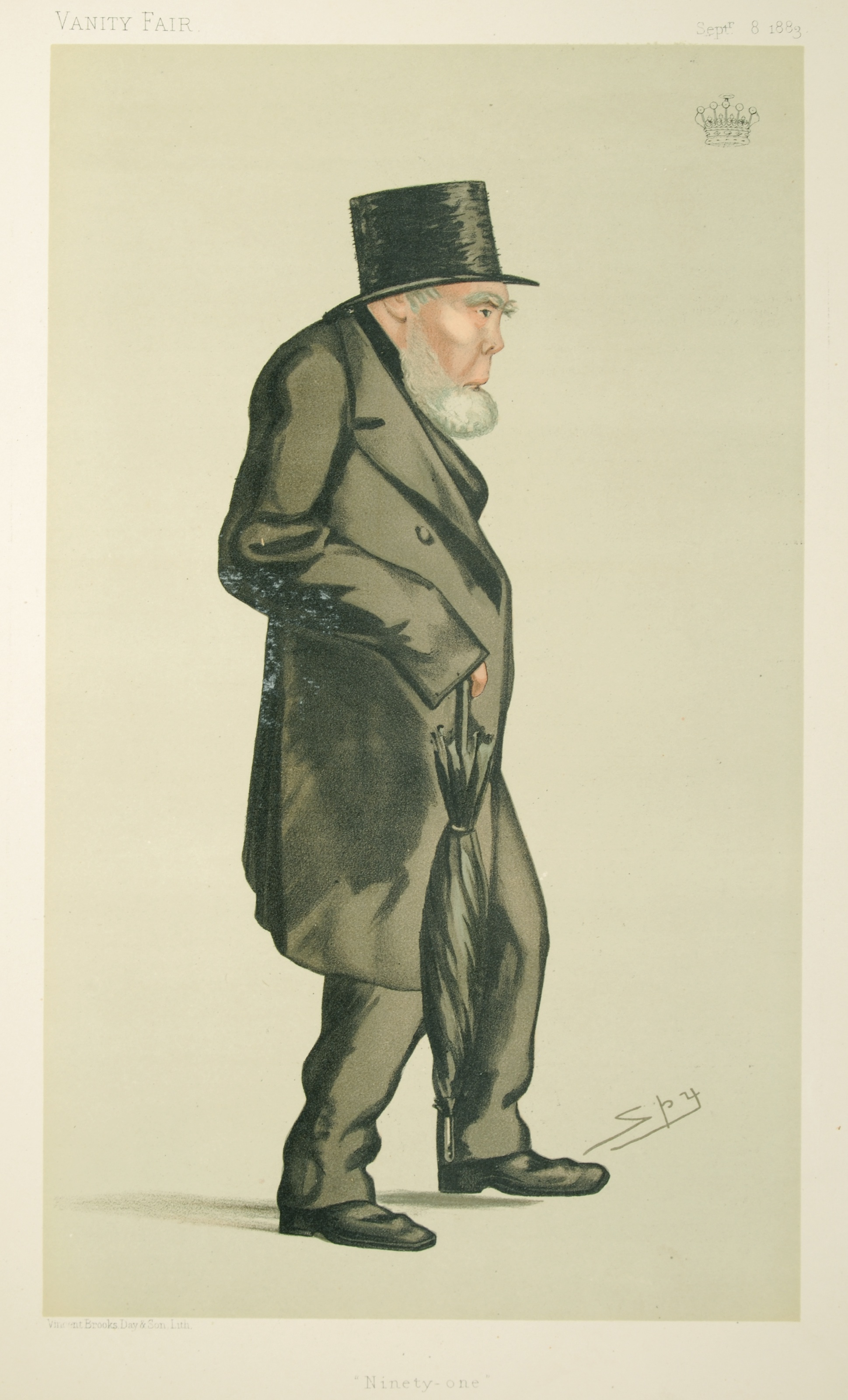
Caricature by Spy published in Vanity Fair in 1883

Stephen Moore, 3rd Earl Mount Cashell (20 May 1792 – 10 October 1883), styled Baron Kilworth until 1822, was an Anglo-Irish aristocrat and politician who spent much of his life in what is now Canada.

== Background and education ==
Lord Kilworth was born in Dublin, Ireland, the son of the 2nd Earl Mount Cashell and Lady Margaret King, daughter of the 2nd Earl of Kingston. His mother's views on the education and treatment of children had been formed by her time as a pupil of Mary Wollstonecraft. He was a graduate of Trinity College, Cambridge.

== Career ==
Lord Mount Cashell spent some time in Switzerland and married in 1819 Anna Marie Wyse/Wyss (c. 1793–1876) of Bern. The couple then lived for a time in Frankfurt, Germany, and had four daughters and three sons.

In 1826 he was elected an Irish representative peer and was able to take a seat in the House of Lords.

In 1833 the family left Europe for British North America and settled in Lobo Township in the London District, Upper Canada (later Lobo Township in Middlesex County, Ontario). Using the services of an agent, Lord Mount Cashell purchased 1,000 acres (4.0 km^{2}) from the estate of the late Captain John Matthews, an Upper Canadian politician and former officer in the Royal Artillery who had come to British North America in the retinue of the 4th Duke of Richmond (1764-1819), Governor-General of British North America from 1818 to 1819 and, formerly, Lord Lieutenant of Ireland from 1807 to 1813. Settling on the former Matthews' estate, Mount Cashell built – by Upper Canadian standards – a large home for his family and servants. During his time in Upper Canada (later Canada West and then Ontario), he sometimes ran foul of local authorities by asserting his rights as an elected representative peer in the Peerage of Ireland. Local folklore indicates that Mount Cashell had the propensity to use a pistol to shoot at flies who infiltrated his home. On 1 October 1865, Mount Cashell's lawyer, H.C.R. Becher, based in nearby London, Ontario, confided in his diary that "The Earl of Mountcashell dines with me often. He is a troublesome client, rather amusing as a guest at first, but in the main a bore." Various members of the family travelled between Britain and the lands in British North America and Mount Cashell's daughter-in-law, Jane Dance, wife of the Hon. George F. Moore and daughter of George Mainwaring Dance, Esq., died at the Lobo property in 1868 and was buried in a local cemetery.

In 1847 he was elected a Fellow of the Royal Society.

By 1870 the family had wound up its dealings in the country and returned to Britain. Mount Cashell was said, when between 85 and 90, to have been engaged to marry a Miss Kennedy. He died ín Paddington, London, aged 91 in October 1883 and was succeeded by his son Stephen Moore, 4th Earl Mount Cashell (1825–1889), who was in turn succeeded by his younger brother Charles William Moore, 5th Earl Mount Cashell (1826–1898).

Peerage of Ireland
Preceded by Stephen Moore	Earl Mount Cashell; 1822–1883	Succeeded by Stephen Moore
Political offices
Preceded by The Viscount Carleton	Representative peer for Ireland; 1826–1883	Succeeded by The Lord Headley
