= Stephen Moore, 2nd Earl Mount Cashell =

Anglo-Irish politician and aristocrat (1770-1822)

Stephen Moore, 2nd Earl Mount Cashell (19 March 1770 – 27 October 1822), styled Lord Kilworth between 1781 and 1790, was an Anglo-Irish politician.

Moore was the eldest son of Stephen Moore, 1st Earl Mount Cashell, and Lady Helena Rawdon, daughter of John Rawdon, 1st Earl of Moira. He became known by the courtesy title Lord Kilworth after his father was elevated to an earldom in 1781. He was returned to the Irish House of Commons for Clonmel in May 1790, but was forced to resign his seat after only a few days on the death of his father. As the holder of an Irish peerage, Lord Mount Cashell was not allowed an automatic seat in the English House of Lords on the formation of the Union in 1800. However, in 1815 he was elected an Irish representative peer, replacing the deceased Earl of Westmeath, and was able to take his seat in the House of Lords.

== Marriage and children ==
Lord Mount Cashell married Lady Margaret King, daughter of Robert King, 2nd Earl of Kingston, in 1791. Margaret's mother, Caroline FitzGerald, daughter of Richard FitzGerald M.P., had educated her children by hiring governesses, including the proto-feminist Mary Wollstonecraft. In 1794 George King, 3rd Earl of Kingston, Margaret's eldest brother, married Lady Helena Moore, Stephen's sister. Lord Mount Cashell acquired numerous other siblings-in-law, doubly closely bonded through the two marriages, including Henry, Edward, and Robert King.

The couple had seven children. The second son, Robert, was born in 1793. The third son, Edward Moore, became a Canon of Windsor Cathedral. The eldest daughter, Helena, was born in March 1795. One of the younger daughters, Jane Elizabeth, married in 1819 William Yates Peel, from the political and merchant family.

== The Grand Tour, and marital separation ==
In December 1801 the Cashells embarked on a grand tour as a group of "nine Irish adventurers", including the diarist Catherine Wilmot. Wilmot wrote extensive letters home, some of which were published in 1920 as An Irish peer on the continent (1801–1803) being a narrative of the tour of Stephen, 2nd earl Mount Cashell, through France, Italy, etc. These describe much detail of the Cashells' life and habits, including their lavish entertaining, especially during the first nine months in Paris. In the French capital, they met Napoleon, the radical English parliamentarian Charles James Fox and, "up half a dozen flights of stairs, in a remote part of the town", Thomas Paine.

In June 1802 the Cashells had another son, Richard Francis Stanislaus Moore, and Wilmot records that its godparents were William Parnel, "the Polish Countess Myscelska", and the American minister (presumably Robert Livingston, who was in post 1801–1804).

The resumption of war in Europe in March 1803 found the party in Florence. In 1804 they decamped to what they assumed was the relative safety of Rome. In Rome they were in the company of the Swiss painter, and founding member of the Royal Academy in London, Angelica Kaufmann; the epicure Lord Bristol, Bishop of Derry (who, in the Volunteer crisis of 1783 is said to have imagined himself King of Ireland); the Cardinal Duke of York, brother to the Young Pretender, Charles Edward Stuart; and the Pope, Pius VII, who in his gardens "very gallantly pull’d a hyacinth and gave it to Lady Mount Cashell".

While in Rome, Margaret was introduced to George William Tighe (1776–1837) of Rosanna, Ashford, County Wicklow, an Anglo-Irish gentleman with an interest in agriculture and, in contrast to her husband, with social and political views similar to her own. The two were instantly attracted and soon embarked on an affair, which in 1805 led to her husband leaving her in Germany and returning to Ireland with their children. Subject to coverture, women in her position had few rights. In November 1812, she was legally separated from her husband with £800 a year and a settlement of her accumulated debts, but with no access to her children. She was never to see them again.

== Death and succession ==
Lord Mount Cashell died in October 1822, aged 52, and was succeeded in the earldom by his eldest son, Stephen. The Countess Mount Cashell, who had left him circa 1803 for George William Tighe (by whom she had two more daughters, Lauretta and Nerina), died in January 1835.

Parliament of Ireland
Preceded by Hon. William Moore; Stephen Moore	Member of Parliament for Clonmel; May 1790; With: Hon. William Moore	Succeeded by Hon. William Moore; Hon. John Moore
Political offices
Preceded by The Earl of Westmeath	Representative peer for Ireland; 1815–1822	Succeeded by The Viscount Lorton
Peerage of Ireland
Preceded by Stephen Moore	Earl Mount Cashell; 1790–1822	Succeeded by Stephen Moore
