= Earl Mount Cashell =

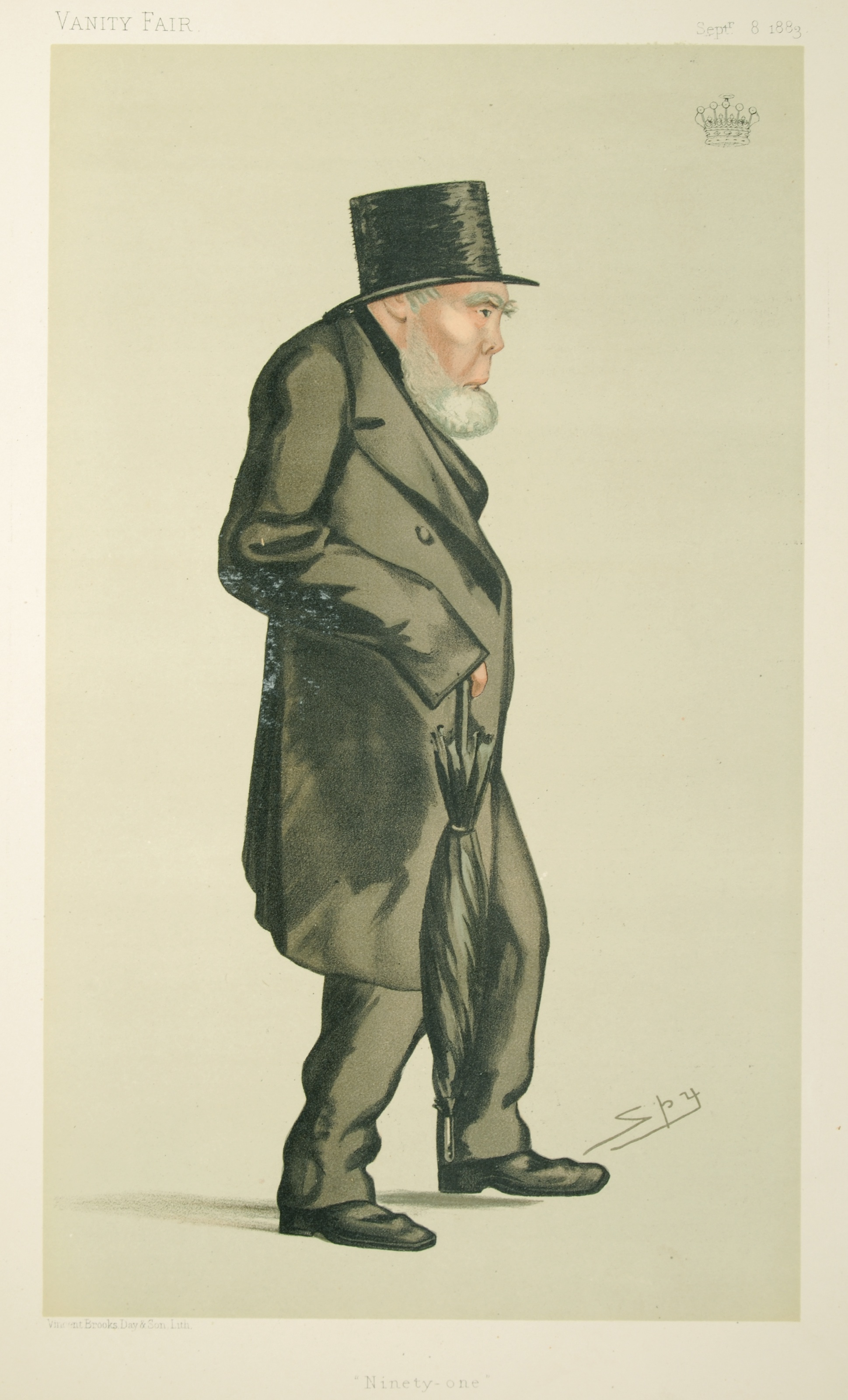
Caricature of the 3rd Earl Mount Cashell by Spy published in Vanity Fair in 1883.

Earl Mount Cashell, of Cashell, County Tipperary, was a title in the Peerage of Ireland. It was created in 1781 for Stephen Moore, 2nd Viscount Mount Cashell, who had previously represented Lismore in the Irish House of Commons.

He was the eldest surviving son of Stephen Moore, member of the Irish Parliament (MP) for County Tipperary, who had been created Baron Kilworth, of Moore Park in the County of Cork, in 1764 and Viscount Mount Cashell, of the City of Cashell, in 1766. These titles were also in the Peerage of Ireland. The first Earl was succeeded by his eldest son, the second Earl. He sat in the House of Lords as an elected Irish representative peer from 1815 to 1822. His eldest son, the third Earl, was an Irish Representative Peer from 1826 to 1883. He was succeeded by his elder son, the fourth Earl, who in his turn was succeeded by his younger brother, the fifth Earl. The titles became extinct on the death of the sixth Earl in 1915.

Richard Moore (1725–1761), eldest son of the first Viscount, represented Clonmel in the Irish Parliament. The Hon. William Moore (died 1810), younger son of the first Viscount, represented Clogher, Clonmel and St Johnstown (Ballinalee) in the Irish Parliament. The family seats were: Moore Park, County Cork; Galgorm Castle, County Antrim; and Mount Cashel Lodge, County Dublin.

== Viscounts Mount Cashell (1766) ==
- Stephen Moore, 1st Viscount Mount Cashell (1695–1766)
  - Richard Moore (1725–1761)
- Stephen Moore, 2nd Viscount Mount Cashell (1730–1790) (created Earl Mount Cashell in 1781)

== Earls Mount Cashell (1781) ==
- Stephen Moore, 1st Earl Mount Cashell (1730–1790)
- Stephen Moore, 2nd Earl Mount Cashell (1770–1822)
- Stephen Moore, 3rd Earl Mount Cashell (1792–1883)
- Stephen Moore, 4th Earl Mount Cashell (1825–1889)
- Charles William Moore, 5th Earl Mount Cashell (1826–1898)
- Edward George Augustus Harcourt Moore, 6th Earl Mount Cashell (1829–1915)

== See also ==
- Viscount Mount Cashell
