= Andrea Vaccà Berlinghieri =

Italian surgeon (1772–1826)

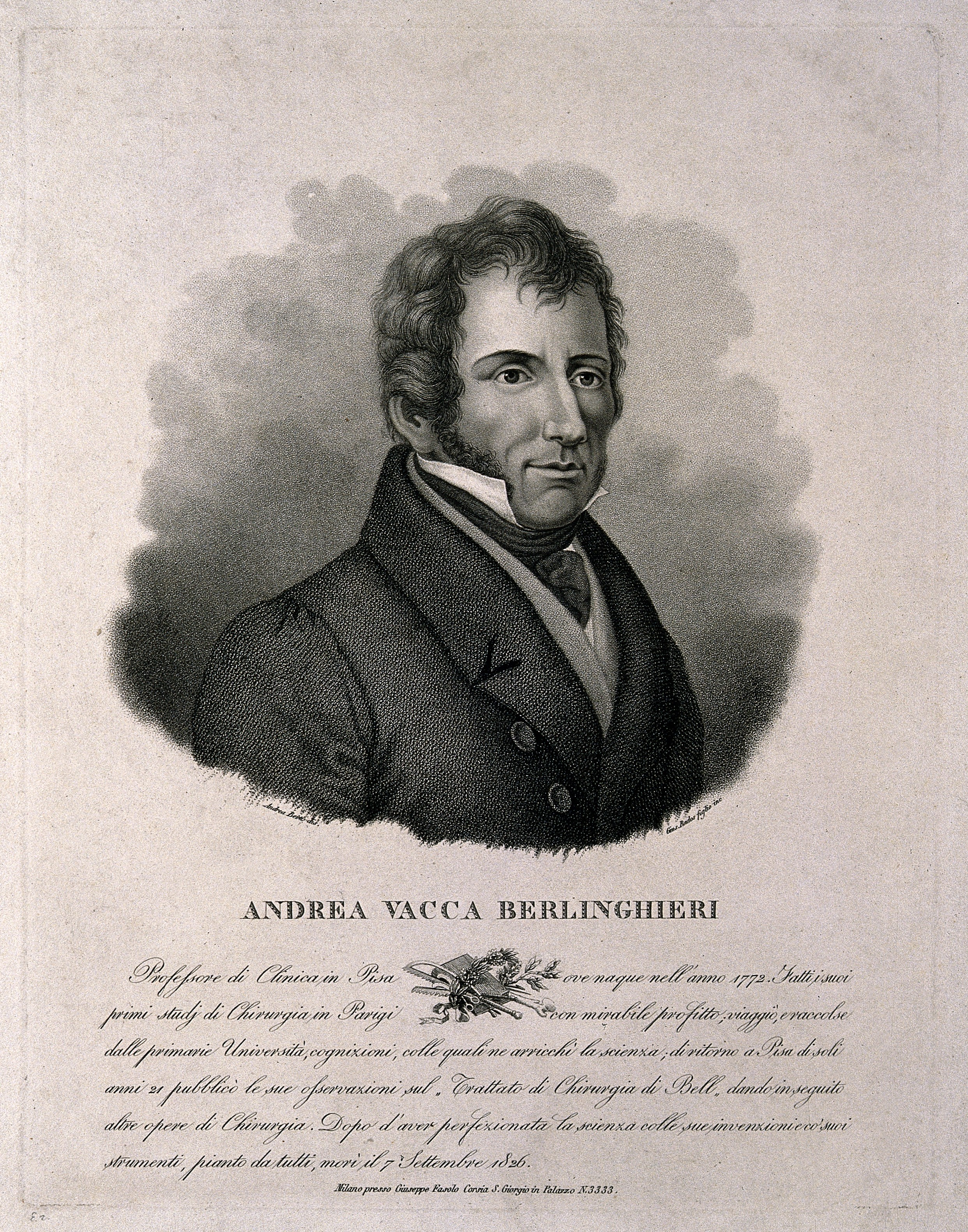
Andrea Vaccà Berlinghieri

Andrea Vaccà Berlinghieri (3 February 1772 – 6 September 1826) was an Italian surgeon born in Montefoscoli, a village in the municipality of Palaia. His older brother, Leopoldo Vaccà Berlinghieri (1768–1809), was a noted Tuscan military figure. His father, Francesco Vacca Berlinghieri (1732-1812), was also a noted physician and writer of medical texts in Tuscany.

In 1787 he travelled to Paris with his brother in order to study medicine. Here he was a pupil to surgeon Pierre-Joseph Desault (1744–1795) and obstetrician Jean-Louis Baudelocque (1745–1810). Two years later he visited London, being interested in the surgical work of John Hunter (1728–1793). Following his return to Italy, he received his degree in medicine and surgery at the University of Pisa.

In 1799 he revisited Paris, where he furthered his studies with Baudelocque, Philippe-Jean Pelletan (1747–1829), Alexis de Boyer (1757–1833), and Antoine Dubois (1756–1837). After his return to Pisa, he became a professor of surgery, an event that is considered to be the start of a new surgical tradition at Pisa. His reputation as a surgeon attracted patients from all over Europe to Pisa, including the Irish aristocrat Margaret King, who had to dress as a man to gain admission to the lectures.

Berlinghieri was a close friend of anatomist Paolo Mascagni (1752–1815).

Berlinghieri was the first surgeon in Italy to perform Hunter's procedure for aneurysms of the popliteal fossa.

== Selected written works ==
- Reflessioni sul trattato di chirurgia del Sig. Begnamino Bell. two volumes. Pisa, 1793) (Referring to Edinburgh surgeon Benjamin Bell (1749–1806).
- Traité des maladies vénériennes (Paris 1800). This text was later revised by Pierre-Philippe Alyon (1758–1816).
- Mémoire sur la structure du péritoine et ses rapports avec les viscères abdominaux. (Mémoires de la Société médicale d’émulation de Paris, 1800, T. III. paper presented at this society).
- Storia dell' anevrisma etc. Pisa, 1803. (with John Hunter's procedure for aneurysm of the popliteal fossa).
- Memoria sopra il metodo di estarre la pietra della vesica orinaria per la via dell' intestine retto. Pisa, 1821. French translation by Blaquière, Paris, 1821. (Advocating the recto-vesical cut for stones).
- Sulla litotomia nei due sessi, Quarta memoria. Pisa, 1825. French translation by Morin, Genèva, 1826. (Describing the median cut — For women, Berlinghieri advocated the vesico-vaginal cut).
