= Galgorm Parks =

Townland in County Antrim, Northern Ireland

Coordinates: 54.860495°N 6.329561°W

Galgorm Castle Golf Club
- Interactive map of Galgorm Castle Golf Club

Club information
- Location: Ballymena, Northern Ireland
- Established: 1995
- Type: Resort
- Total holes: 18

Galgorm Castle
- Designed by: Simon Gidman
- Par: 71
- Length: 7,105 yards

Galgorm is a townland in County Antrim, Northern Ireland, about 1 km west of Ballymena. It is part of the civil parish of Ahoghill. Administratively, it is in the Borough of Ballymena.

The townland encompasses the village of Galgorm and much of the area between Ballymena and Galgorm itself. It is bordered by the townlands of Artibrannan to the north, Lisnafillon and Fenaghy to the west and Ballykennedy to the south. It is on the River Maine. The village itself sits predominantly where the Galgorm Road, Sand Road and Fenaghy Roads meet and it has a small number of independent businesses and shops

On the outskirts of Galgorm and just prior to the old Moravian settlement of Gracehill sits the old Gallahers/JTI plant, which when vacated became an extension of Wrightbus, a major employer in the Ballymena Area. Wrightbus was taken over by JCB in early 2020 and remains a large employer in the area

The majority of the townland is from a Protestant background and for the best part is a residential extension of Ballymena, a central Northern Ireland shopping town. The townland has two separate Orange Order lodges, Galgorm Loyal Orange Lodge and Galgorm Parks Loyal Orange Lodge

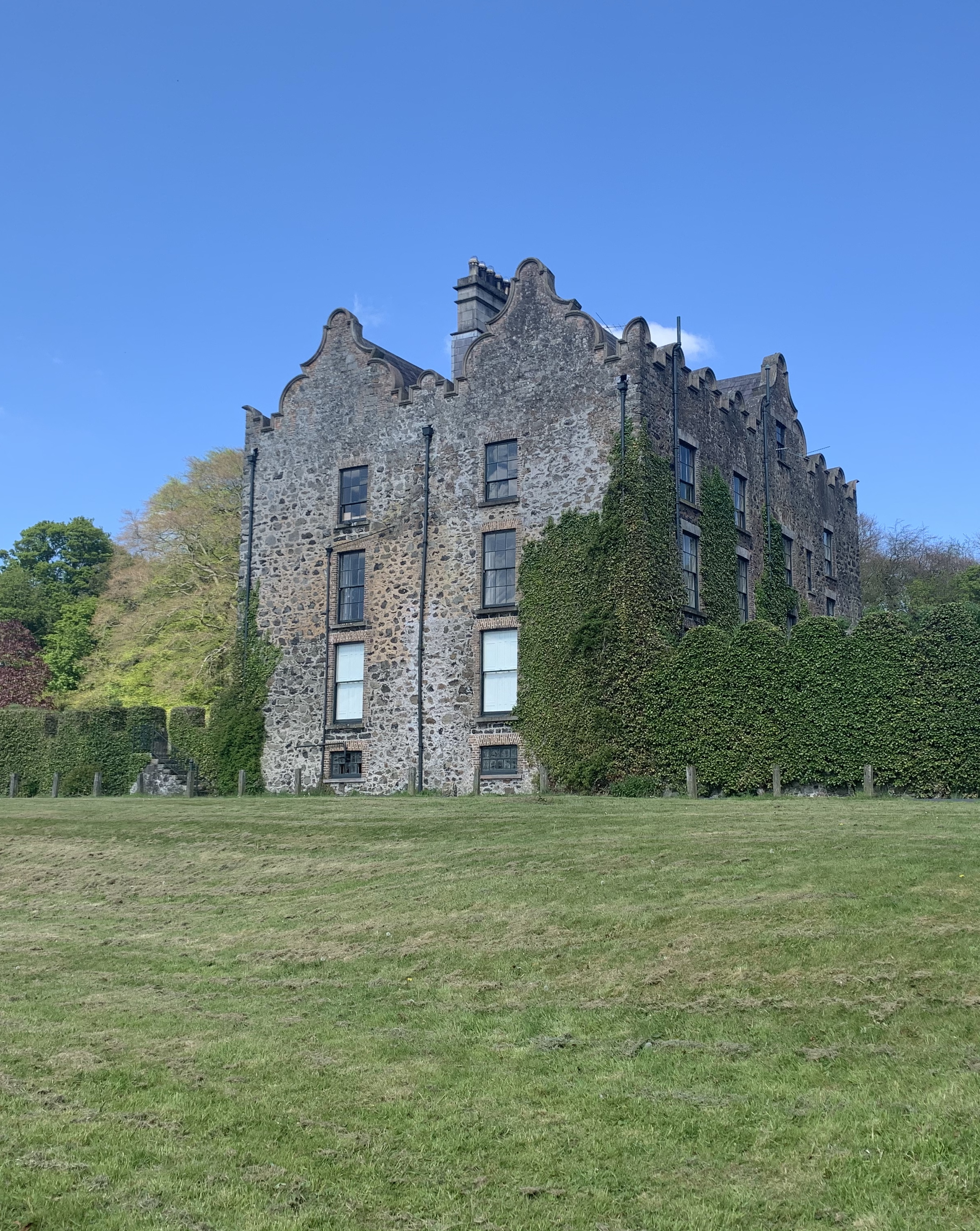
Galgorm Castle

The boundaries for the townland are the previous estate boundaries of Galgorm Castle which was constructed in 1618 by Sir Faithful Fortescue and is recognised as one of the finest examples of early Jacobean architecture in Ireland. Fortescue sold it in 1645 to Dr. Alexander Colville, from whom it passed to his son Sir Robert Colville, and later by descent to Earl Mount Cashell. The grounds and castle have been used for filming and TV projects, including The Frankenstein Chronicles featuring Sean Bean. The castle itself is now on the site of Galgorm Castle Golf Club, home to the Northern Ireland Open.

In September 2020, the course hosted the Irish Open after the event was rescheduled and moved from Mount Juliet Golf & Spa Hotel during the COVID-19 pandemic.
