= Faithful Fortescue =

Arms of Fortescue: Azure, a bend engrailed argent, plain cotised or

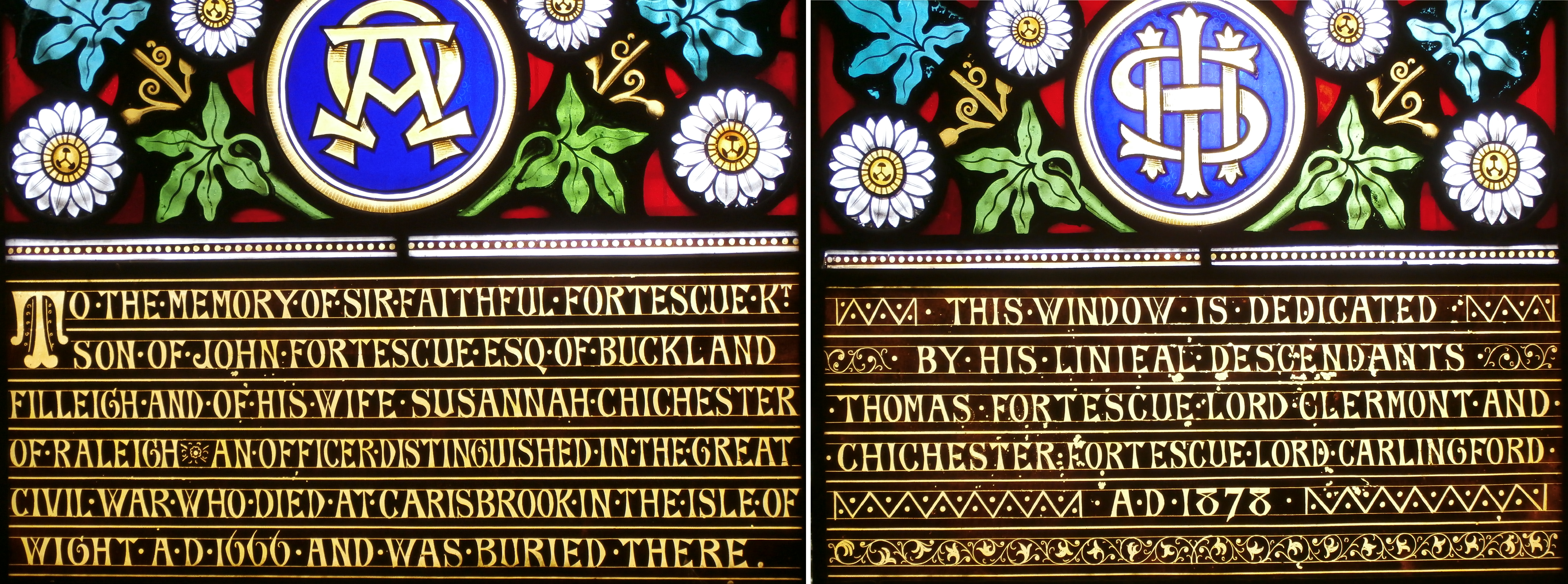
Inscriptions in 1878 stained glass window in Buckland Filleigh Church, Devon, commemorating Sir Faithful Fortescue. Window erected in his memory jointly by his lineal descendants Thomas Fortescue, 1st Baron Clermont (1815–1887), an Irish Whig politician and the historian of the Fortescue family, and his younger brother Chichester Fortescue, 1st Baron Carlingford (1823–1898)

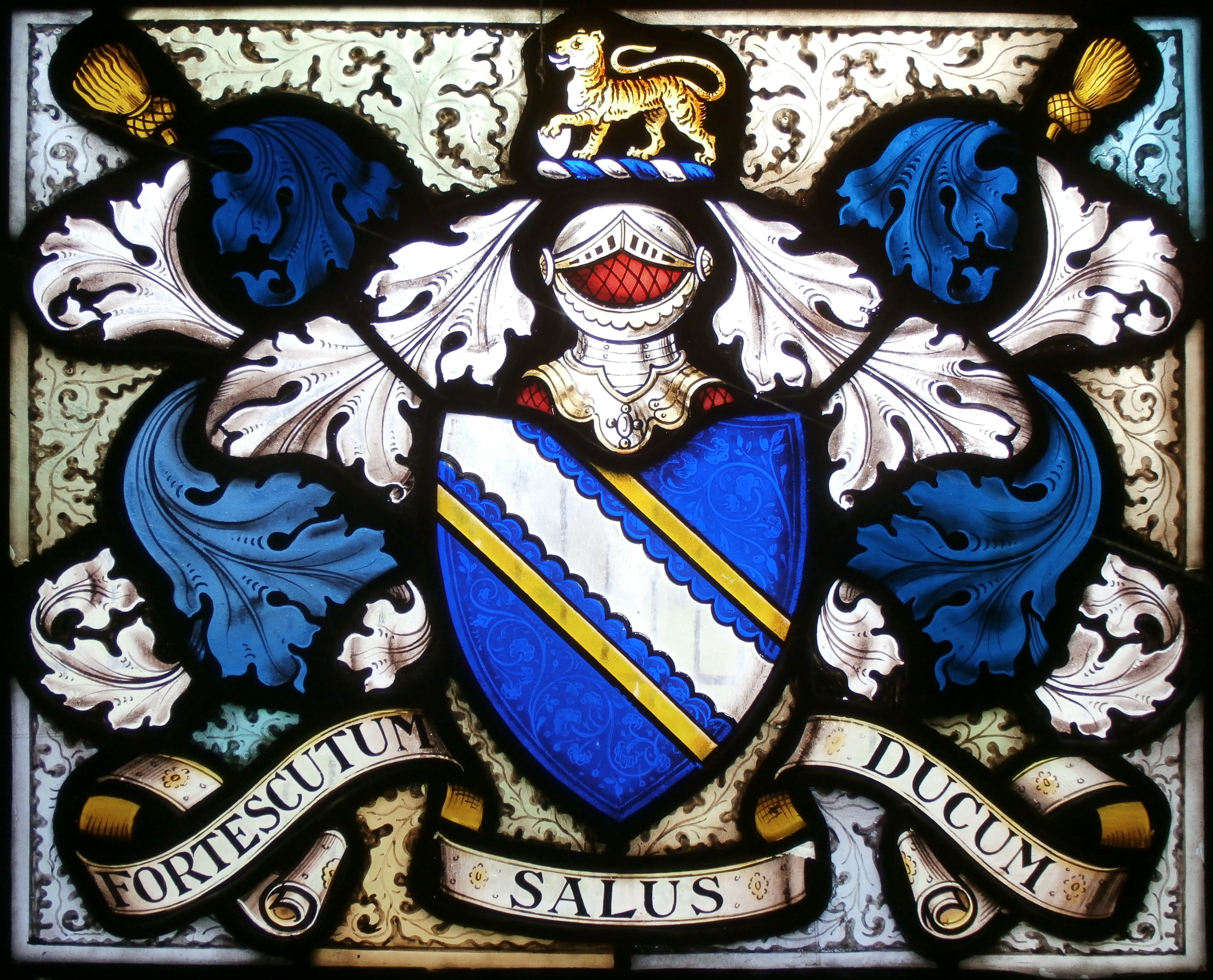
Detail from 1878 commemorative stained glass window in Buckland Filleigh Church, Devon, showing heraldic achievement of Sir Faithful Fortescue

Sir Faithful Fortescue (1585–1666), of Dromiskin in County Louth, Ireland, was life Governor of Carrickfergus in Ireland, long the chief seat and garrison of the English in Ulster and was a royalist commander during the English Civil War.

== Origins ==
Fortescue was born in 1585, (Note: Parents married in September 1584, baptised 22 August 1585) the third son of John Fortescue (d. 1604) of Buckland Filleigh in Devon, but the first by his second wife Susannah Chichester, eldest daughter of Sir John Chichester (c. 1516/22-1569) of Raleigh in the parish of Pilton and of Youlston both in North Devon, a Member of Parliament, Sheriff of Devon in 1552 and 1557, by his wife Gertrude Courtenay, a daughter of Sir William Courtenay (1477–1535) of Powderham in Devon. One of Susannah's brothers was Arthur Chichester, 1st Baron Chichester of Belfast (1563–1625), who was to play such an influential role in the life of Faithful Fortescue.

Although Faithful's father's second marriage is not mentioned in the Heraldic Visitation return made in 1620 by his elder half-brother Roger Fortescue of Buckland Filleigh, this second marriage is recorded in the parish register of Heanton Punchardon in Devon, near Raleigh, on 22 September 1584, and although the first name of the groom is illegible, the will of Susanna's brother Arthur Chichester, 1st Baron Chichester confirms the marriage when he mentions "my nephew Sir Faithful Fortescue".

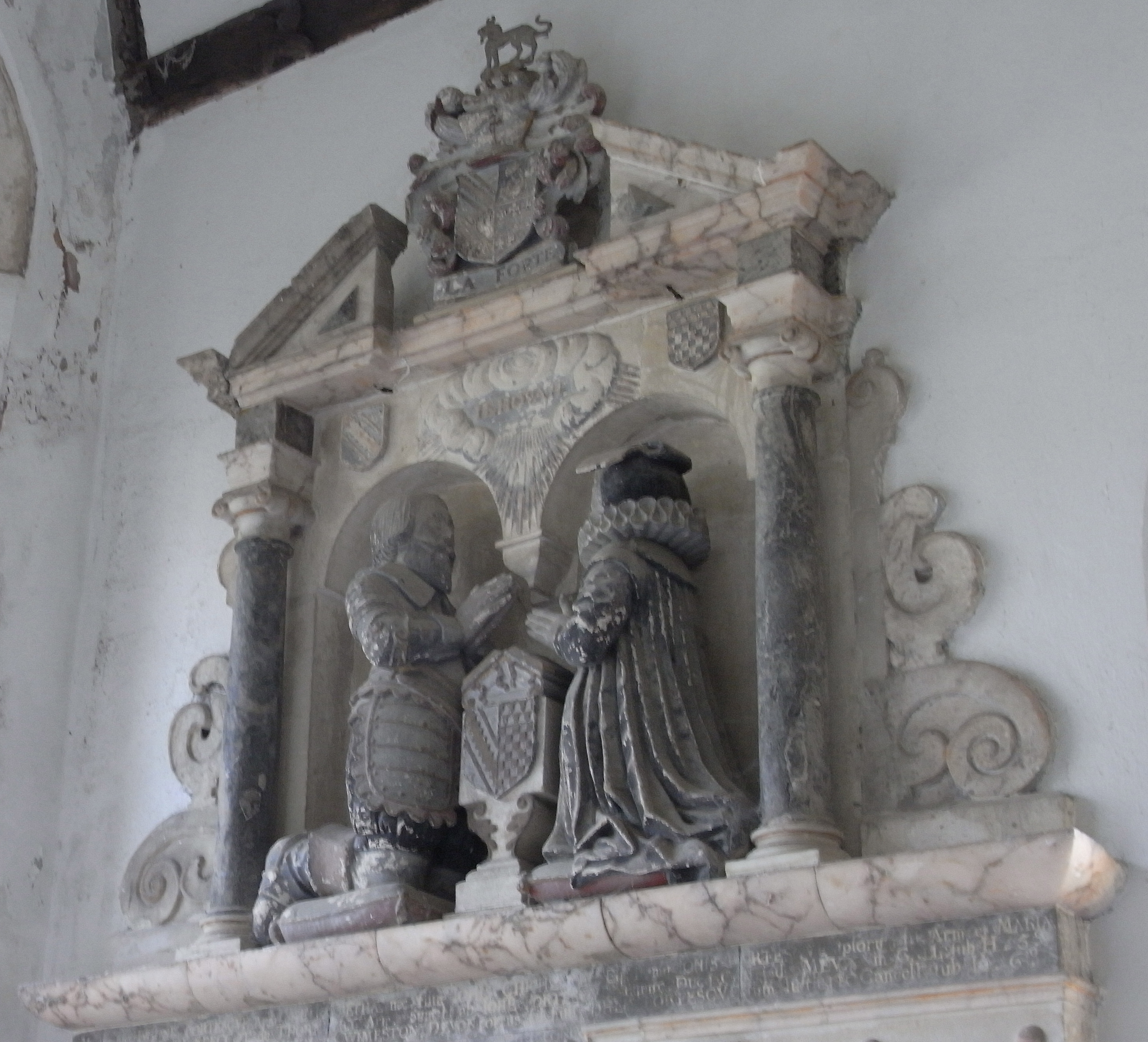
Effigies in Weare Giffard Church, Devon, of Hugh Fortescue (1545–1600), Sheriff of Devon in 1583, and of his wife Elizabeth Chichester, aunt of Faithful Fortescue, who was baptised in that church

Faithful was baptised on 22 August 1585 at Wear Gifford, North Devon, which manor was then a seat of his father's third cousin, Hugh Fortescue (1545–1600) of Wear Giffard Hall and of Filleigh, Sheriff of Devon in 1583, who was married to Elizabeth Chichester, Faithful's aunt, whose descendant later in the 18th century was created Earl Fortescue. The Fortescues of Filleigh and their cousins the Fortescues of Buckland Filleigh were both descended from Martin Fortescue (d. 1472) of Filleigh and Wear Gifford, who married Elizabeth Densel, heiress of Filleigh, Wear Gifford and Buckland Filleigh. Faithful Fortescue was a descendant in the fifth generation of Sir John Fortescue (c. 1394–1479), Chief Justice of the King's Bench, of Ebrington Manor, Gloucestershire, a younger grandson of the Fortescue family of Whympston in the parish of Modbury in Devon, the earliest Fortescue seat in the British Isles.

Faithful was named after his uncle Sir Faithful Fortescue (c.1512-c.1608), whose 2nd son, also Faithful Fortescue, served with the army in Flanders and was a Lieutenant-Colonel in the royal army.

== Career ==
In 1598 Fortescue's maternal uncle, Sir Arthur Chichester (1563–1625), later created Baron Chichester of Belfast, went to Ireland in command of a regiment of infantry, and took with him Faithful Fortescue. In a brief memoir of his uncle (later published by the family's historian Lord Clermont (d.1887)), Faithful Fortescue wrote: "With the first Lord Chichester I had, from coming young from school, my education, and by him the foundation of my advancement and fortune I acquired in Ireland". In 1604 Sir Arthur Chichester was appointed Lord Deputy of Ireland, an office which he held until 1616. This was the period of the Plantation of Ulster, and Fortescue acquired offices and lands in the north of Ireland. In 1606 he received a patent for life of the post of Constable of Carrickfergus Castle, otherwise known as Knockfergus Castle, one of the major fortified places in the north of Ireland.

A few years later he obtained a grant from the crown comprising an extensive range of territory in County Antrim, which had formerly belonged to the Irish chieftain Rory Oige MacQuillane (Rory Og MacQuillan), which he erected into the "manor of Fortescue". A part of this land he sold in 1624; the remainder, together with the property of Dromiskin in County Louth, was handed down to his descendants. In the Irish parliament of 1613, there was gerrymandering by the creation of borough and county franchises among the new English and Scottish settlements in Ulster. Fortescue was elected to this parliament as member for Charlemont; in the subsequent parliaments of 1634 and 1639 he sat in turn as member for Dungannon and County Armagh, while his eldest son Chichester succeeded him as representative for Charlemont.

In 1624 he obtained the command of a company in the army raised in England to serve in the Netherlands under Count Mansfeld; but through the interest of Lord Chichester he was permitted to exchange into a regiment then being enlisted in Cumberland and other northern counties of England for service in Ireland.

Lord Wentworth, appointed Lord Deputy in July 1633, some months before his arrival in Ireland, commissioned Fortescue to raise a troop of horse, of which he was to have the command. The commission brought with it heavy expenditure and a long series of personal differences with Wentworth (later 1st Earl of Strafford). His troubles began as soon as Wentworth landed in Ireland, when he immediately dismissed, without any pay, forty of the newly enrolled troopers, to make room for the gentlemen and servants he had brought with him; difficulties about payments followed, then refusals to promote Fortescue and his sons, then scandals about his lordship's visits to a 'noble lady,’ then a personal quarrel. The business ended in a letter from Lord Strafford, after he had left Ireland, during his imprisonment in the Tower of London, ordering his steward to discharge Fortescue from the command of his troop.

== Irish rebellion of 1641 ==
In 1640 or 1641 Fortescue petitioned the House of Commons for promotion to the rank of lieutenant-colonel in the Irish establishment. On 27 January 1642 this petition came before the house; on that day a report was received from John Pym, on behalf of the committee for Irish affairs, to the effect that the king had commanded the lord-lieutenant Robert Sidney, 2nd Earl of Leicester, to recommend seven officers to the house for commands in Ireland. The committee recommended Fortescue, the house 'being very well satisfied that he is a man of honour and experience and worthy of such an employment'.

Fortescue received the appointment of Governor of Drogheda during the summer of 1641. In October of that year, the Irish Rebellion of 1641 broke out in Ulster. The insurgents were able, without resistance, to seize Newry, Carrick, Charlemont, and other places, and threatened Drogheda, the only fortified town between them and Dublin. The town was not garrisoned, and the only troops Fortescue was able to obtain consisted of sixty-six horse and three companies of foot, raised hurriedly by his brother-in-law, Charles Moore, 2nd Viscount Moore of Drogheda. Finding his body of men inadequate to the defence of the place, Fortescue threw up his commission and went to England for help. Nicholas Bernard, who was in Drogheda during the siege, says of Fortescue on this occasion that, "though willing to hazard his life for us, yet he was loath to lose his reputation also". Fortescue left behind his eldest son, Chichester Fortescue, who was in command of a company in Lord Moore's regiment, and who died during the siege, and his second son, John Fortescue, who was killed by the rebels. Shortly after his departure Sir Henry Tichborne was appointed by the lords justices governor of the place, and brought to its relief a force of a thousand-foot and a hundred horse.

The commissioners of parliament appointed to raise a force for the suppression of the Irish rebellion selected Fortescue in June 1642 for the command of the third troop of horse intended to serve under Lord Wharton, as lord-general of Ireland. In addition to this body of cavalry, Fortescue also raised for service in Ireland a company of infantry, which was attached to the Earl of Peterborough's regiment, and was then compelled to serve with the parliamentary army in England during the civil war.

== In action in the First English Civil War ==
While waiting at Bristol to cross to Ireland, Fortescue's troop was placed under the command of Robert Devereux, 3rd Earl of Essex. It was marched to the Midlands to take part in the campaign on the side of the Parliament. Charles I issued a protest against the diversion, naming especially Fortescue and his troop of horse. On the eve of the battle of Edgehill, Fortescue, who was acting as major in Lord Wharton's regiment of horse, tried negotiations with Prince Rupert, and promised to desert. On the next day, when Prince Rupert charged the left wing of the parliamentary army, Fortescue with his troop drew off from the rest of Lord Wharton's regiment and rode over to the royal horse. Many of Fortescue's troopers forgot to throw away orange scarfs worn as the Earl of Essex's colours, and eighteen out of the sixty men of the troop were killed or wounded by the cavalry whom they had joined.

Soon after the battle, Fortescue was appointed to the command of the 10th regiment of the royal infantry, and served with the army whose headquarters was at Oxford during the remainder of the civil war.

== Later royalist service ==
In 1647 he accompanied the Marquis of Ormonde during his Irish campaign, and remained with him until the retreat of the royal army from Dublin to Drogheda. He made his way to the Isle of Man, and thence crossed to Wales. At Beaumaris he was arrested and imprisoned by order of the House of Commons, first at Denbigh Castle, and afterwards at Carnarvon Castle.

He was able to join Charles II at Stirling in the spring of 1651, and took part in the campaign which ended in the battle of Worcester.

== Later life ==
Fortescue went to the continent, where he remained, at first in France, and afterwards in the Netherlands, until the English Restoration. By royal warrant of 21 August 1660 he was restored to the post of Constable of Carrickfergus Castle, an office which he was permitted to transfer a few months later to his eldest surviving son, Sir Thomas Fortescue, and was created a Gentleman of the Privy Chamber. This office attached him to the royal court, and he lived mainly in London.

== Death and burial ==
He sought refuge on the Isle of Wight from the Great Plague of London in 1665 and died there in the manor-house of Bowcombe, near Carisbrooke, in May 1666, being more than eighty-five years of age, and was buried at Carisbrooke Church. No contemporary monument survives, although his descendant and the historian of the Fortescue family Lord Clermont erected a brass tablet on the wall on the north side of Carisbrooke Church inscribed as follows:

"In memory of Colonel Sir Faithful Fortescue, Knight, son of John Fortescue, Esquire, of Buckland-Filleigh in Devon, by Susannah, daughter of Sir John Chichester of Raleigh. He was a distinguished Royalist officer, and fought in several battles of the Great Civil War. At the Restoration he became a Gentleman of the Privy Chamber to King Charles II. Having left London to avoid the contagion of the plague, he retired to this island, and soon afterwards, being then of a great age, died at the manor of Bowcombe in this parish, and was buried within these precints on the 29th day of May, A.D. 1666. This tablet is placed here by his eldest male representative, Thomas (Fortescue) Lord Clermont, A.D. 1866"

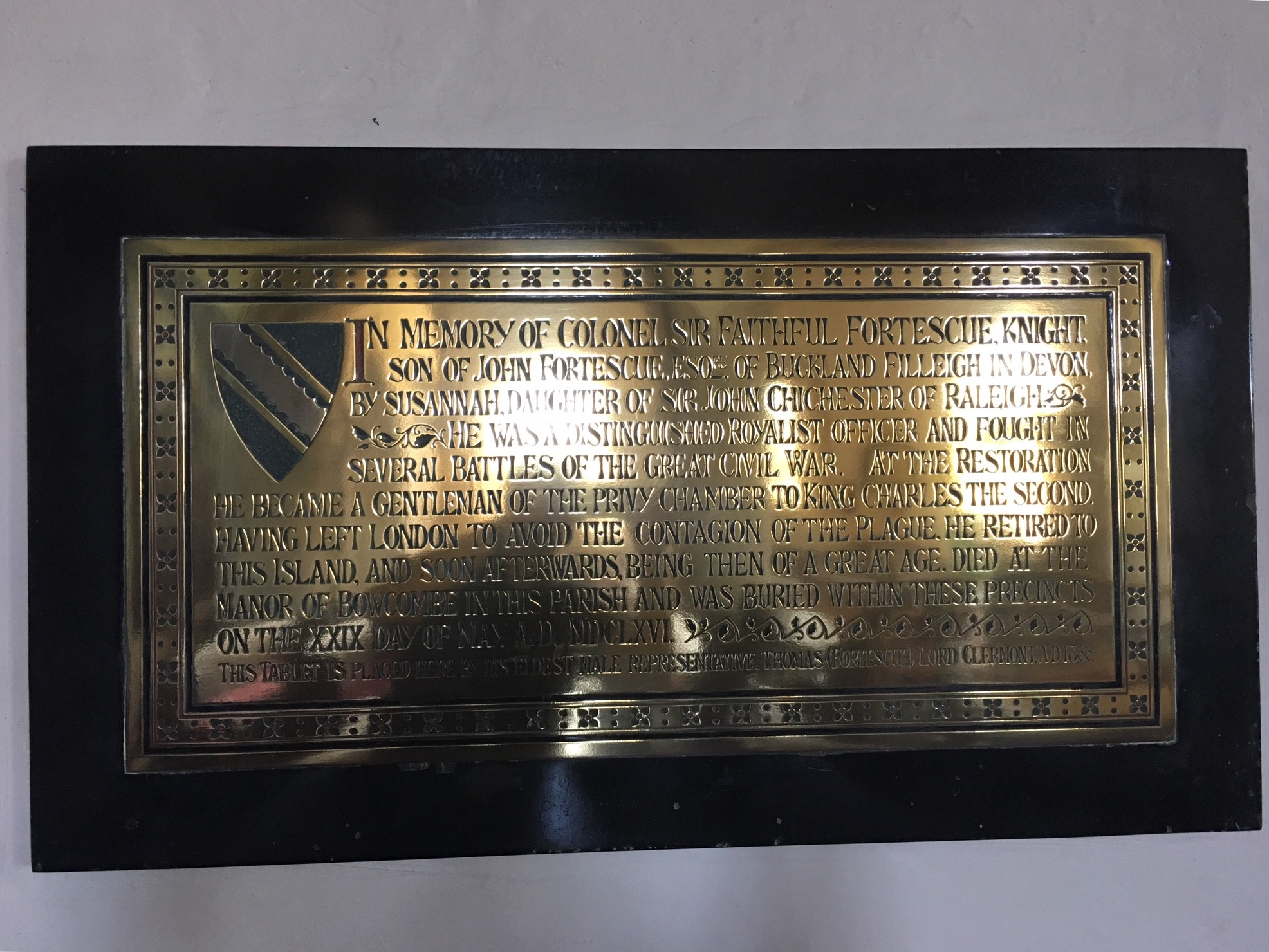
Memorial to Faithful Fortescue in St Mary's Church, Carisbrooke, Isle of Wight

In addition in 1878 Lord Clermont and his younger brother Lord Carlingford erected in his memory a stained glass window in Buckland Filleigh Church in Devon, next to the manor house in which he was born, inscribed as follows:

"To the memory of Sir Faithful Fortescue, Knight, son of John Fortefcue, Esquire of Buckland-Filleigh, and of his wife Susannah Chichester of Raleigh, an officer distinguished in the great Civil War, who died at Carisbrook in the Isle of Wight, A.D. 1666, and was buried there, this window is dedicated by his lineal descendants Thomas Fortescue, Lord Clermont, and Chichester Fortescue, Lord Carlingford, A.D. 1878."

== Marriage and progeny ==
Fortescue married twice:

- Firstly to Anne Moore (d.1634), a daughter of Garret Moore, 1st Viscount Moore (ancestor of the Marquis of Drogheda). She died on 5 September 1634 and was buried in St. Patrick's Cathedral. By her he had 16 children (5 of whom died young) ten sons and six daughters including:
  - Chichester Fortescue (d.1641), of Donoughmore, County Down, eldest son and heir apparent, who succeeded his father as Member of Parliament for Charlemont. He trained as a lawyer at the Inner Temple and married Elizabeth Slingsby (d.1695), daughter of Sir William Slingsby, of Kippax in Yorkshire, who survived him and remarried to John Villiers, Viscount Purbeck, brother of George Villiers, Duke of Buckingham. By his first wife he had one child:
    - Elizabeth Fortescue (d.1705), who married Sir Richard Graham of Norton Conyers, near Ripon, and was the ancestress of Sir Reginald Graham (fl.1869). Elizabeth Fortescue was buried in the parish church of Warth. Her portrait was at Norton Conyers until the removal of the pictures in 1864, upon the sale of the mansion and estate, but the arms of Graham impaling Fortescue were still visible in 1869 above the entrance door.
  - He was a major in the army in Ireland and raised a company at his own expense in Lord Moore's regiment, and died in 1641 during the Siege of Drogheda, his father having shortly before resigned as Governor of Drogheda, leaving his two sons in the garrison.
  - John Fortescue (d.1642), 2nd son, killed by the rebels in Ireland in 1642, died unmarried.
  - Sir Thomas Fortescue (c.1620-1710), 3rd and eldest surviving son and heir, who held a commission in the royal army during the civil war, succeeded his father in his estates, and was the ancestor of Lord Clermont, and of his brother, Chichester Parkinson-Fortescue, 1st Baron Carlingford. He married twice, firstly to Sydney Kingsmill, daughter of Colonel William Kingsmill, son of Sir Francis Kingsmill, of Sidmonton, in Hampshire, by his wife Jane St. Leger, daughter of Sir Watham St. Leger, of Ulcombe in Kent. Secondly, he married Elizabeth Cary, a daughter of Sir Ferdinando Cary, grandson of the first Lord Hunsdon, by whom he had no issue. By his first wife he had two sons:
    - Chichester Fortescue;
    - William Fortescue;
      - Thomas Fortescue, M.P. and father of the first Viscount Clermont.
  - ...... Fortescue, 4th son, killed in action in Ireland.
  - Roger Fortescue;
  - Garret Fortescue;
  - William Fortescue.
  - Lettice Fortescue, married to Sir Thomas Meredith, Knight;
  - Eleanor Fortescue, married firstly to Thomas Burnet, slain in the service of King Charles I; secondly to Colonel Brent Moore, of the family of Beneden (or Moor Place) in Kent;
  - Mary Fortescue;
  - Elizabeth Fortescue;
  - Alice Fortescue.
- Secondly no later than 1637, to Eleanor Whitechurch, a daughter of Sir Marmaduke Whitechurch, Knight, and widow of John Symonds, Esquire, by whom he had no issue.

== Residences ==
He had the following residences:

- Dromiskin in County Louth, Ireland. It was mentioned in a contemporary narrative by Sir Edward Brereton dated 8 July 8, 1635: "About five miles hence (i.e. from Dundallce), we saw Sir Faithful Fortescue's house or castle wherein for most part he is resident, which he holds by a long lease upon a small rent, under my Lord Primate of Armath. This is a dainty, pleasant, healthful, and commodious seat". He later bought a considerable freehold estate around it, which his descendant Lord Clermont still owned in 1869, the castle and grounds having long since disappeared.
- Galgorm Castle, near Ballymena, County Antrim. Fortescue built the castle, which still stands, in 1618. He sold it in about 1645 to the Scots-born clergyman Dr. Alexander Colville, who made some additions to it. It is considered one of the finest examples of early Jacobean architecture in Ireland.

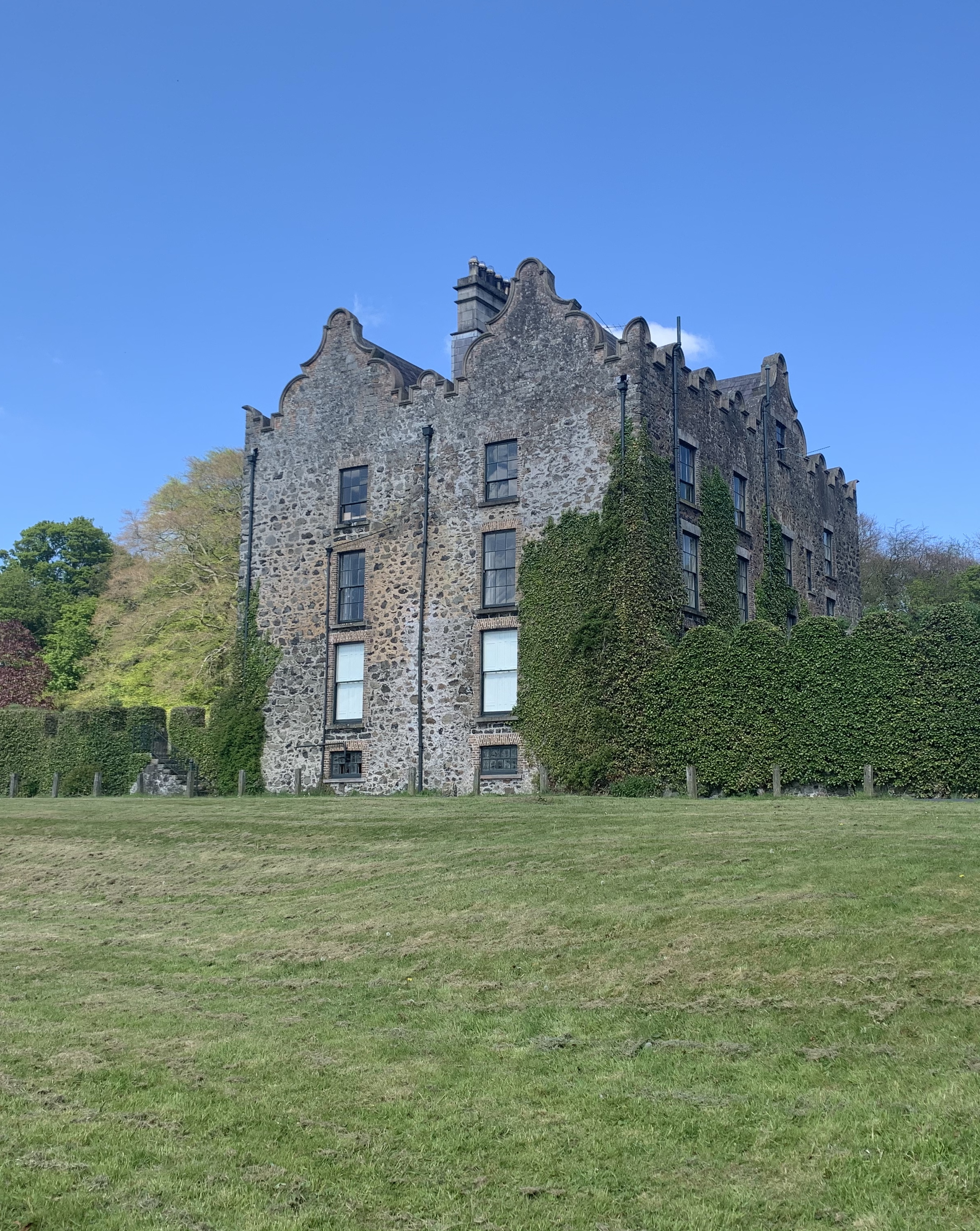
Galgorm Castle, which Fortescue built in 1618

== Literary works ==
- An Account of the Rt. Honourable Arthur, first Lord Chichester, Lord Deputy of Ireland, by his Nephew, Sir Faithful Fortescue, Knight, a short biography of his uncle Arthur Chichester, 1st Baron Chichester of Belfast (1563–1625), of whom he stated "noe man knew his composition and dispofition better than myself", published in 1869 by his descendant Thomas Fortescue, 1st Baron Clermont.

== Sources ==
- Clermont, Lord Thomas Fortescue (1880). History of the Family of Fortescue in all its Branches. London: Ellis and White.
- Vivian, Lt.Col. J.L. (1895). The Visitations of the County of Devon: Comprising the Heralds' Visitations of 1531, 1564 & 1620. Exeter.
- "Fortescue, Faithful" . Dictionary of National Biography. London: Smith, Elder & Co. 1885–1900.

Attribution

This article incorporates text from a publication now in the public domain: "Fortescue, Faithful". Dictionary of National Biography. London: Smith, Elder & Co. 1885–1900.
