= Bloomsbury Dispensary for the Relief of the Sick Poor =

The Bloomsbury Dispensary for the Relief of the Sick Poor was an institution founded in 1801 to provide medical aid and suitable nourishment to the poor people of that part of London.

George Pinckard founded the dispensary on 26 October 1801 and became its first physician, remaining there for thirty years. It was established at 62 Great Russell Street.
