= Edward Moore (canon of Windsor) =

British Canon of Windsor (1798–1876)

Hon. Edward George Moore M.A. (1798 - 8 February 1876) was a Canon of Windsor from 1834 to 1876

== Family ==
He was the third son of Stephen Moore, 2nd Earl Mount Cashell and Margaret King, an Irish hostess, writer, traveller, and medical adviser.

In 1827 he married Ann Matilda, daughter of 16th Lord Clinton

== Career ==
He was educated at St John's College, Cambridge and graduated MA in 1822.

He was appointed:

- Rector of West Ilsley, Berkshire.

He was appointed to the eleventh stall in St George's Chapel, Windsor Castle in 1834, and held the stall until 1876.
