= Alexander Colville (principal) =

Scottish academic

Alexander Colville (1595–1666) was a senior Church of Scotland minister who served both as Principal of St Andrews University and was a professor at the University of Sedan in France. Of aristocratic birth, he declined his "de jure" title of Lord Culross.

== Life ==
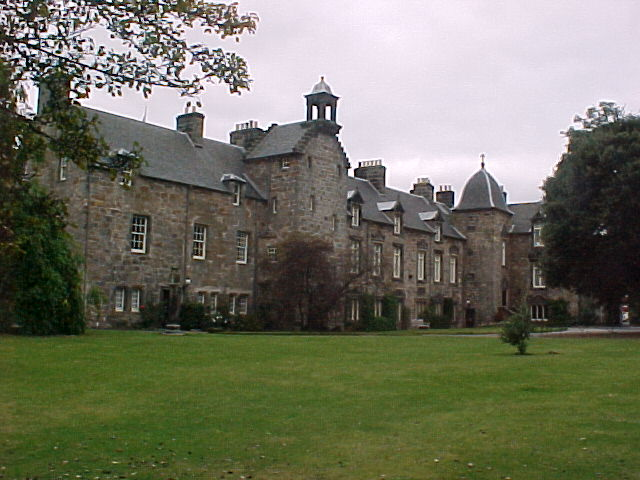
St Mary's College, St Andrews, of which Colville was Principal

He was born at Wester Comrie, Scotland, the eldest son of John Colville, Commendator of Culross, who at some point became Lord of Culross. His mother was the poet Elizabeth Melville, daughter of Sir James Melville of Halhill.

He was educated for ministry in the Church of Scotland, and around 1635, he obtained a post as Professor of Theology and Hebrew at the University of Sedan in France. In 1647 he adopted the Chair of Divinity at St Mary's College, St Andrews. In 1648, Edinburgh town council offered him the Chair of Divinity at Edinburgh University, but the General assembly refused the move. The council then chose Samuel Rutherford, but he declined the post. The position was eventually filled by David Dickson in 1650.

Around 1656, he became entitled Lord Colville of Culross but chose to decline both the title and the estate which instead passed to his cousin.

In 1662, he was appointed Principal of St Mary's College in place of Samuel Rutherford (who had chosen this role instead of Edinburgh).

He died in St Andrews in January 1666, aged 70. His position at St Mary's College was filled by Walter Comrie.

== Family ==
Around 1635, he married a French woman, Anne Le Blanc, of Sedan. Their children included:

- John Colville, minister of Mid Calder
- Abraham Colville, Professor of Hebrew and Mathematics at the University of Sedan
- Sarah Colville
- Unnamed son and daughter who died on consecutive days in St Andrews in June 1664.
