= Clonmel (Parliament of Ireland constituency) =

Pre-1801 Irish constituency

- Former borough constituency for the Irish House of Commons
- County: County Tipperary
- Borough: Clonmel

–1801
- Replaced by: Clonmel

Clonmel was a constituency represented in the Irish House of Commons until its abolition on 1 January 1801.

== History ==
In the Patriot Parliament of 1689 summoned by James II, Clonmel was represented with two members.

== Members of Parliament ==
- 1560: Henry White and John Strich
- 1585: Geoffrey White and John Bray
- 1613–1615: Nicholas White and John Bray
- 1634–1635: Geoffrey Barron (expelled 1634) and Henry fitz Nicholas White
- 1639–1649: William Smythe and Richard Gethin
- 1661–1666: Sir Thomas Stanley of Tickincorr (sat for Co Louth, Replaced 1661 by Sir James Shane) and Sir Francis Foulke

=== 1689–1801 ===
Election	First MP	Second MP
1689	Nicholas White	John Bray
1692	Robert Blennerhassett	Richard Moore
1703	Thomas Medlycott	Robert Hamerton
1713	Stephen Moore	Robert Hamerton
1727	Robert Marshall	Robert Hamerton
1733	Robert Marshall	Sir Thomas Prendergast, 2nd Bt
1756	William Bagwell	Sir Thomas Prendergast, 2nd Bt
1757	Guy Moore	Sir Thomas Prendergast, 2nd Bt
May 1761	Guy Moore	Richard Moore
1761	Guy Moore	Colvill Moore
1776	Guy Moore	Stephen Moore
1781	Guy Moore	William Moore
1783	Stephen Moore	William Moore
1790	Lord Kilworth	William Moore
1792	John Moore	William Moore
1798	Stephen Moore	Thomas Worth Newenham
1800	Stephen Moore	John Dennis
1801	Succeeded by the Westminster constituency Clonmel	

== Bibliography ==
- O'Hart, John (2007). The Irish and Anglo-Irish Landed Gentry: When Cromwell came to Ireland. Vol. II. Heritage Books. ISBN 978-0-7884-1927-0.
- Leigh Rayment's historical List of Members of the Irish House of Commons. Cites: Johnston-Liik, Edith Mary (2002). The History of the Irish Parliament 1692-1800 (6 volumes). Ulster Historical Foundation.
