= Annaly =

Arms of the Lords Annaly

Annaly is an Irish lordship and former principality, named for its conqueror Angaile, ancestor of the Ó Fearghail. The territory of Annaly coincides with modern County Longford and was conquered in the 10th century by Angaile, a King of Fortúatha whose line were chiefs of Annaly. Angaile's great-grandson Fearghail was the progenitor of the Ó Fearghail family, who were historically the Princes of Annaly. The lineage of Fearghail also provided chiefs of the Dál Messin Corb dynasty and the Uí Garrchon.

== Princes of Angaile ==
The history of Angaile is detailed in the Annals of the Four Masters. From the turn of the 11th century until the colonial confiscations of James I in the early 17th century, the Ó Fearghail controlled Angaile as a principality. This rule was disrupted by repeated English invasions in the 12th and 13th centuries. By the 15th century, the tribe regained complete control and had divided into the North Angaile ruling White Ó Fearghail (Irish: Uí Fhearghail Bán) and the South Angaile ruling Yellow Ó Fearghail (Uí Fhearghail Buí). After the tribal Gaelic Order had been shattered, many members of the clan became tenants of their old land with English and Scottish landlords.

== Captains of The Annaly ==
In 1565, there is the grant in the patent rolls of the Captainship and Chief status of the Slewght William of the Annaly. Slewght William is Gaelic for Clan Liam, and the Captainship is a Chief title for the Clan. The grant is made by Queen Elizabeth I in 1565. The Sleughtwilliam historically includes the Ardagh and Edgeworthstown regions. This grant by the Queen Elizabeth to Lord Delvin Christopher Nugent was effectuated on 22 Nov 1565. Further, the possessions and the captainship of Slewaght (Ardagh Diocese) within the Analy were granted to Lord Devlin in 1565 with the Abbey of All Saints, and the custody or captainship of Slewaght within the Analy. Lord Delvin was also granted the abbey lands of the island of Inishmore or Inchemore in County Longford where the famous St. Columb lived before leaving to convert the Scots.

== Barons of Annaly ==
Baron Annaly is a title that has been created three times, twice in the Peerage of Ireland and once in the Peerage of the United Kingdom. The third creation is currently extant.

The first creation came in the Peerage of Ireland in 1766 when the lawyer and politician John Gore was made Baron Annaly of Tenelick in the County of Longford. He had previously represented Jamestown and County Longford in the Irish House of Commons and served as Solicitor-General for Ireland from 1760 to 1764. Gore was the son of George Gore, younger son of Sir Arthur Gore, 1st Baronet, whose elder son Paul Gore was the grandfather of Arthur Gore, 1st Earl of Arran. George, like his son, was Attorney General and a High Court judge. Other members of the Gore family include the Gore Baronets of Magharabeg, the Barons Harlech and the Earls Temple of Stowe (a title which has come into the family through marriage). On Lord Annaly's death in 1784 the title became extinct. The second creation came in the Peerage of Ireland in 1789 when Henry Gore was created Baron Annaly of Tenelick, in the County of Longford. He was the younger brother of John Gore, 1st Baron Annaly of the 1766 creation. Gore had previously represented County Longford and Lanesborough in the Irish House of Commons. On his death in 1793 this title became extinct as well.

The third creation came in the Peerage of the United Kingdom in 1863 when the Liberal politician Henry White was made Baron Annaly of Annaly and Rathcline in the County of Longford. He had earlier represented County Dublin and County Longford in the House of Commons and also served as Lord Lieutenant of County Longford. White's father Luke White had previously represented County Leitrim in Parliament as a Whig. The first Baron's son, the second Baron, sat as a Liberal Member of Parliament for County Clare, County Longford and Kidderminster and served as a Junior Lord of the Treasury from 1862 to 1866 in the Liberal administrations of Lord Palmerston and Lord Russell. He was also Lord Lieutenant of County Longford. As of 2017, the title is held by his great-great-grandson, the sixth Baron, who succeeded his father in 1990. He served briefly as a government whip in 1994 in the Conservative government of John Major. However, Lord Annaly lost his seat in the House of Lords after the House of Lords Act of 1999 removed the automatic right of hereditary peers to sit in the upper chamber of Parliament. The family seat was Luttrellstown Castle, near Clonsilla, Dublin in Republic of Ireland.

== Feudal Lords of The Honour of Annaly - Westmeath and later County Longford ==
The Honour of Annaly and Ancient Teffia - The medieval Nugent holdings of the Barony of Delvin were so extensive that they effectively constituted an Honour—a great feudal lordship composed of multiple manors, liberties, and subordinate estates held directly of the Crown. From the original 1172 de Lacy grant to Hugh de Nugent and his successors which included parts of Annaly, the Delvin lordship expanded beyond its Meath nucleus into the western Teffian and Annaly territories, absorbing lands held by the O’Finolin, O’Skully, and related septs. Early surveys, genealogical accounts, and later Tudor confirmations indicate that the Nugent-Delvin sphere controlled a substantial portion—approximately 30% or more—of what later became County Longford, particularly along the Teffia & Annaly frontier. This breadth of authority, spanning clustered manors, military service lands, and customary chief-rents, fits the classic definition of an Honour: a consolidated feudal jurisdiction whose size and influence exceeded an ordinary barony and shaped the territorial evolution of both medieval Annaly and modern Longford.

1552 Edward VI Grants to Delvin in Annaly - In 1552, King Edward VI granted lands of Annaly to Baron Delvin including the Holy Island and lands of the Ó Fearghail.

In 1556–57, King Philip and Queen Mary Grants to Delvin in Annaly - made grants to Lord Baron Delvin of Granard and the northern Annaly region before the county became County Longford. This grant is from Queen Mary of England and the King Philip (Von Habsburg) King of Spain, Portugal, Naples, Sicily, Duke of Milan, Lord of the Netherlands, and Count of Burgundy. Thus, this grant by Mary and Philip awarded a territorially coherent Gaelic polity (Teffia/Annaly) in a rare dual-sovereign act from the pre-eminent Catholic monarch granting full attributes of territorial lordship—courts, rents, jurisdictions, ecclesiastical sites, and direct tenure in capite—thereby vesting the Baron of Delvin with delegated sovereignty functionally equivalent to that exercised by mediatized princes on the Continent.

Massive Grants in Longford - James I (1605–1612) also granted to Lord Baron Delvin various castles, lands, ancient seats, and the Island and monastery of Inchemore, otherwise Inismore, in the Annalie.

Markets and Fair for Longford Annaly - In 1605, Markets and Fair Rights for Annaly-Longford - Grant by James I of England to Baron Delvin of market-and-fair rights, plus “courts” (baronial court/curia) in Longford: licence to hold a Thursday market and a fair on 1 August, with accompanying juridical rights. This 1605 royal grant to Sir Richard Nugent, Lord Delvin — recorded in the History of the County Longford (p. 123) — carries considerable feudal and sovereign significance, both legally and symbolically.

Captainship and Custody of the Annaly & Clann William - In 1565 (Elizabeth I) made Royal Patent to Baron Delvin of the – “Captaincy of Slewght William” (Slewght-Uilliam or Clann Liam i.e. Annaly) which this chieftaincy and custody had previously belonged to his father as a hereditary title and the honor was never revoked.

== See also ==
- Ó Fearghail
- Irish nobility
