= List of peerages created for women =

This is a list of peerages created for women in the peerages of England, Scotland, Ireland, Great Britain, or the United Kingdom. It does not include peerages created for men which were later inherited by women, or life peerages created since 1958 under the Life Peerages Act 1958 or under the Appellate Jurisdiction Act 1876.

== Background ==
Prior to the regular creation of life peerages, the great majority of peerages were created for men. Suo jure peeresses are known from an early period; however, most of them were women to whom a peerage had passed as an inheritance. It was very rare for a woman to be created a peeress before the 17th century. Peeresses of the first creation were not allowed to sit in the House of Lords until the passage of the Life Peerages Act 1958. Female holders of hereditary peerages could not sit in the Lords until the passage of the Peerage Act 1963. In some, but not all cases, peeresses of first creation were created for life only.

Created peeresses fall into the following categories:

- Created for merit or achievement
- Having a father who was a peer, but who under the terms of the peerage could not pass the peerage to his daughter. Such an event could create the anomalous situation of commoners holding important lands and estates traditionally associated with lordship.
- Closely connected to a reigning monarch (including many royal mistresses)
- Created to honour a relative, including:
  - As a posthumous honour for a dead husband, often one who would have received a peerage if he had not died
  - To honour a husband who was living, but could not or would not accept a peerage in his own right (for instance if he wanted to retain his seat in the elected Commons)
  - To confer nobility upon the peeress's children, again often in recognition of the achievement of a husband

The peerages are listed chronologically, divided by the monarch who created them.

== Richard II ==
Date	Title	Recipient	Current status	Notes
1397	Duchess of Norfolk; Peerage of England	Margaret, 2nd Countess of Norfolk	Extinct on death of recipient 24 March 1399.	For life only.

== Henry VIII ==
Date	Title	Recipient	Current status	Notes
1512	Countess of Salisbury; Peerage of England	Margaret Pole	Forfeited upon arrest for treason in May 1539.	First cousin once-removed of Henry VIII (first cousin to Henry's mother, Elizabeth of York).
1532	Lady Marquess of Pembroke; Peerage of England	Anne Boleyn	Uncertain: either forfeited upon conviction for treason 15 May 1536, or extinct upon her death on 19 May 1536.	Second wife of Henry VIII.

== James I ==
Date	Title	Recipient	Current status	Notes
1618	Countess of Buckingham; Peerage of England	Mary, Lady Villiers	Extinct on death of recipient 1632.	For life only.
29 July 1620	(Kingdom of Ireland) Baroness Offaly	Lettice Digby	Extant, as a subsidiary title of the Duke of Leinster.	Granddaughter of the 1st Baron Offaly of the first creation.
8 July 1623	(Kingdom of England) Viscountess Maidstone	Elizabeth, Lady Finch	Extant, as a subsidiary title of the Earl of Winchilsea.	

== Charles I ==
Date	Title	Recipient	Current status	Notes
29 February 1628	Lady Cramond; Peerage of Scotland	Elizabeth, Lady Richardson	Extinct 1735.	
12 July 1628	Countess of Winchilsea; Peerage of England	Elizabeth, 1st Viscountess Maidstone	Extant	
12 September 1640	Baroness Stafford; Peerage of England	Mary (Stafford) Howard	Extinct on death of recipient 1693.	For life only. Sister of the 5th Baron Stafford of the fourth creation and wife of the 1st Baron Stafford of the fifth creation
1641	Countess Rivers; Peerage of England	Elizabeth, Viscountess Savage	Extinct on death of recipient, 9 March 1650.	For life only. Daughter of the 1st Earl Rivers of the second creation who could not inherit his title.
23 May 1644	Duchess of Dudley; Peerage of England	Alice, Lady Dudley	Extinct on death of recipient 1668.	For life only. Wife of Robert Dudley, styled Earl of Warwick.

== Charles II ==
Date	Title	Recipient	Current status	Notes
29 May 1660	Countess of Chesterfield; Peerage of England	Katherine Stanhope, Lady Stanhope	Extinct on death of recipient, 9 April 1667.	For life only. For service.
1660	Countess of Guilford; Peerage of England	Elizabeth Boyle, Viscountess Boyle	Extinct on death of recipient, 1667.	For life only.
20 April 1663	Duchess of Buccleuch; Peerage of Scotland	Anne Scott, 4th Countess of Buccleuch	Extant.	On the occasion of her marriage to James Scott, 1st Duke of Monmouth.
1663	Baroness Lucas, of Crudwell, in the County of Wiltshire; Peerage of England	Mary Grey, Countess of Kent	Extant.	Daughter of John, 1st Baron Lucas.
June 1667	Duchess of Cleveland, Countess of Southampton, and Baroness Nonsuch, of Nonsuch Park; Peerage of England	Barbara Palmer, Countess of Castlemaine	Extinct 1774.	Mistress of Charles II.
19 August 1673	Duchess of Portsmouth, Countess of Fareham, and Baroness Petersfield; Peerage of England	Louise de Kérouaille	Extinct on death of recipient 14 November 1734.	For life only. Mistress of Charles II.
1674	Baroness Belasyse; Peerage of England	Susan Belasyse	Extinct on death of the recipient in 1713.	For life only.
1674	Viscountess Bayning; Peerage of England	Anne Murray	Extinct on death of recipient 1678.	For life only.
1679	Viscountess Corbet	Sarah Corbet	Extinct on death of recipient 1682.	For life only.
1680	Countess of Sheppey	Elizabeth Lennard	Extinct on death of recipient 1686.	For life only.

== James II ==
Date	Title	Recipient	Current status	Notes
1686	(Kingdom of England) Countess of Dorchester; Baroness Darlington	Catherine Sedley	Extinct on death of recipient 26 October 1717	For life only. Mistress of James II.
5 October 1688	(Kingdom of England) Countess of Stafford	Mary Howard, Baroness Stafford	Extinct on death of recipient, 1693.	For life only. Wife of William Howard, 1st Viscount Stafford, executed 1680.
13 December 1688	(Kingdom of Ireland) Baroness Shelburne	Elizabeth, Lady Petty	Extinct on death of recipient, February 1708.	For life only.

== George I ==
Date	Title	Recipient	Current status	Notes
1 January 1715	(Kingdom of Great Britain) Countess Granville; Viscountess Carteret	Grace Granville Carteret	Extinct 1776.	Daughter of John Granville, 1st Earl of Bath.
18 July 1716	(Kingdom of Ireland) Duchess of Munster; Marchioness of Dungannon; Countess of Dungannon; Baroness Dundalk	Melusine von der Schulenburg	All titles extinct on death of recipient, 10 May 1743.	For life only. Mistress and unofficial wife of George I.
19 March 1719	(Kingdom of Great Britain) Duchess of Kendal; Countess of Feversham; Baroness Glastonbury	Melusine von der Schulenburg	All titles extinct on death of recipient, 10 May 1743.	For life only. Mistress and unofficial wife of George I.
1721	(Kingdom of Ireland) Countess of Leinster	Countess Sophia von Platen	Extinct on death of recipient 20 April 1725.	For life only. Half-sister of George I.
6 April 1722	(Kingdom of Great Britain) Countess of Darlington; Baroness Brentford	Countess Sophia von Platen	Extinct on death of recipient 20 April 1725.	For life only. Half-sister of George I.
7 April 1722	(Kingdom of Great Britain) Countess of Walsingham	Melusina von der Schulenburg	Extinct on death of recipient 16 September 1778.	For life only. Illegitimate daughter of George I.

== George II ==
Date	Title	Recipient	Current status	Notes
24 March 1740	(Kingdom of Great Britain) Countess of Yarmouth	Amalie von Wallmoden	Extinct on death of recipient, 19 October 1765.	For life only. Mistress of George II.
1746	(Kingdom of Ireland) Viscountess Grandison	Elizabeth Mason	Extinct 1800.	Daughter of John Villiers, 1st Earl Grandison.
18 October 1749	(Kingdom of Great Britain) Countess Temple	Hester Grenville, 2nd Viscountess Cobham	Extinct 26 March 1889.	
1 August 1758	(Kingdom of Ireland) Countess of Brandon	Ellis Agar Bourke Bermingham	Extinct on death of recipient, 11 March 1789	For life only.
21 May 1760	(Kingdom of Great Britain) Baroness Stawell	Mary Bilson-Legge	Extinct 1820.	Daughter of the 4th Baron Stawell who could not inherit his title.

== George III ==
Date	Title	Recipient	Current status	Notes
3 April 1761	(Kingdom of Great Britain) Baroness Mount Stuart	Mary Stuart, Countess of Bute	Extant, as a subsidiary title of the Marquess of Bute.	Wife of the Earl of Bute, soon to become prime minister.
4 December 1761	(Kingdom of Great Britain) Baroness Chatham	Lady Hester Pitt	Extinct 24 September 1835.	Wife of William Pitt the Elder, the recently resigned Leader of the House of Commons.
6 May 1762	(Kingdom of Great Britain) Baroness Holland	Lady Caroline Fox	Extinct 18 December 1859.	Wife of Henry Fox, then Leader of the House of Commons.
1766	(Kingdom of Ireland) Viscountess Langford; Baroness Summerhill	Elizabeth Rowley	Extinct 1796.	
1767	(Kingdom of Ireland) Countess Grandison Viscountess Villiers	Elizabeth Mason, Viscountess Grandison	Extinct 1800.	
19 August 1767	(Kingdom of Great Britain) Baroness Greenwich	Lady Caroline Townshend	Extinct on death of recipient 11 January 1794.	Daughter of John Campbell, 1st Duke of Greenwich.
1770	(Kingdom of Ireland) Baroness Arden	Catherine Perceval, Countess of Egmont	Extinct 2011.	
20 May 1776	(Kingdom of Great Britain) Baroness Hamilton of Hameldon	Elizabeth Campbell, Duchess of Argyll	Extant, as a subsidiary title of the Duke of Argyll.	
1783	(Kingdom of Ireland) Baroness Donoughmore	Christiana Hely-Hutchinson	Extant, as a subsidiary title of the Earl of Donoughmore.	
1783	(Kingdom of Ireland) Countess of Longford	Elizabeth Pakenham	Extant	
1790	(Kingdom of Ireland) Baroness Oriel of Collon	Margaretta Amelia Foster	Extant, as a subsidiary title of the Viscount Massereene.	
1792	(Kingdom of Ireland) Baroness Waterpark	Sarah, Lady Cavendish	Extant	
13 June 1792	(Kingdom of Ireland) Baroness Fermanagh	Mary Verney	Extinct on death of recipient 15 November 1810.	Granddaughter of Ralph Verney, 1st Earl Verney.
26 July 1792	(Kingdom of Great Britain) Baroness Bath	Laura Pulteney	Extinct on death of recipient, 14 July 1808.	
1793	(Kingdom of Ireland) Countess of Wicklow	Alice, Viscountess Wicklow	Extinct 1983.	Widow of Ralph Howard, 1st Viscount Wicklow.
27 March 1795	(Kingdom of Great Britain) Baroness Hood	Susanna Hood	Extant, as a subsidiary title of the Viscount Hood.	
1795	(Kingdom of Ireland) Baroness Kilwarden	Anne Wolfe	Extinct 1830.	
1 December 1797	(Kingdom of Ireland) Baroness Crofton	Anne, Lady Crofton	Extant	In place of her husband, Sir Edward Crofton, 2nd Baronet, who died 30 September 1797.
1797	(Kingdom of Ireland) Viscountess Ferrard	Margaretta, 1st Baroness Oriel	Extant	
1797	(Kingdom of Ireland) Baroness Norwood	Grace Toler	Extant, as a subsidiary title of the Earl of Norbury	
1798	(Kingdom of Ireland) Baroness ffrench	Rose, Lady ffrench	Extant	For her son, Sir Thomas ffrench, who later inherited the title.
31 July 1800	(Kingdom of Ireland) Baroness Dufferin and Claneboye	Dorcas, Lady Blackwood	Extant	In place of her late husband, Sir John Blackwood, 2nd Baronet, d. 27 February 1799.
1800	(Kingdom of Ireland) Baroness Nugent	Mary Nugent-Temple-Grenville	Extinct 1850.	
1800	(Kingdom of Ireland) Baroness Newcomen	Charlotte Gleadowe-Newcomen	Extinct 1825.	In place of her husband, Sir William Gleadowe-Newcomen, 1st Baronet.
28 May 1801	(United Kingdom) Baroness Abercromby	Mary, Lady Abercromby	Extinct 1924.	In place of her husband Lieutenant-General Sir Ralph Abercromby, who died 28 March 1801 following the Battle of Alexandria.
19 June 1802	(United Kingdom) Baroness Sandys	Mary Hill, Marchioness of Downshire	Extant, as a subsidiary title of the Marquess of Downshire.	
1803	(Kingdom of Ireland) Viscountess Newcomen	Charlotte, 1st Baroness Newcomen	Extinct 1825.	In place of her husband, Sir William Gleadowe-Newcomen, 1st Baronet.
26 October 1803	(United Kingdom) Countess of Bath	Laura, 1st Baroness Bath	Extinct upon death of recipient, 14 July 1808.	
25 October 1816	(United Kingdom) Countess de Grey	Amabel Hume-Campbell, 5th Baroness Lucas	Extinct 1923.	

== George IV ==
Date	Title	Recipient	Current status	Notes
18 July 1821	(United Kingdom) Baroness Rayleigh	Lady Charlotte Strutt	Extant	In place of her husband, Joseph Strutt MP, who refused a peerage.
27 June 1826	(Kingdom of Ireland) Baroness FitzGerald and Vesey	Catherine Vesey	Extinct 20 March 1860.	
22 January 1828	(United Kingdom) Viscountess Canning	Joan Scott Canning	Extinct 17 June 1862.	In place of her husband George Canning, Prime Minister, who died in office 8 August 1827.

== William IV ==
Date	Title	Recipient	Current status	Notes
28 May 1831	(Kingdom of Ireland) Baroness Talbot of Malahide	Margaret Talbot	Extant	
3 June 1834	(United Kingdom) Baroness Wenman	Sophia Wykeham	Extinct upon death of recipient 1870.	
22 January 1836	(United Kingdom) Baroness Stratheden	The Hon. Mary, Lady Campbell	Extant	Wife of Sir John Campbell.

== Victoria ==
Date	Title	Recipient	Current status	Notes
10 April 1840	(United Kingdom) Duchess of Inverness	Lady Cecilia Underwood	Extinct upon death of recipient 1 August 1873.	Illegally married to Prince Augustus Frederick, Duke of Sussex.
21 October 1861	(United Kingdom) Countess of Cromartie; Viscountess Tarbat; Baroness Castlehaven; Baroness Macleod	Anne, Duchess of Sutherland	Extant	Descendant of George Mackenzie, 3rd Earl of Cromartie.
27 April 1864	(United Kingdom) Baroness Buckhurst	Elizabeth, Countess De La Warr	Extant, as a subsidiary title of the Earl De La Warr.	Daughter of John Sackville, 3rd Duke of Dorset and 9th Baron Buckhurst.
30 November 1868	(United Kingdom) Viscountess Beaconsfield	Mary Anne Disraeli	Extinct upon death of recipient, 15 December 1872.	Placeholder for her husband Benjamin Disraeli, who remained in the House of Commons.
9 June 1871	(United Kingdom) Baroness Burdett-Coutts	Angela Burdett-Coutts	Extinct upon death of recipient, 30 December 1906.	For service.
23 April 1880	(United Kingdom) Baroness Bolsover	Augusta Cavendish-Bentinck	Extinct 21 March 1977.	In place of her deceased husband Lieutenant-General Arthur Cavendish-Bentinck.
14 August 1891	(United Kingdom) Baroness Macdonald of Earnscliffe	Agnes, Lady Macdonald	Extinct on death of recipient, 5 September 1920.	In place of her husband, Sir John A. Macdonald, who died in office as Prime Minister of Canada 6 June 1891.
11 November 1891	(United Kingdom) Viscountess Hambleden	Emily Danvers Smith	Extant	In place of her husband, William Henry Smith, who died in office as Leader of the House of Commons 6 October 1891.
2 August 1899	(United Kingdom) Baroness Dorchester	Henrietta Carleton	Extinct 20 January 1963.	Daughter of 3rd Baron Dorchester who could not inherit his title.

== George V ==
Date	Title		Recipient	Current status	Notes
8 May 1928	(United Kingdom)	Countess Cave of Richmond	Anne Cave, Viscountess Cave	Extinct upon death of recipient 1938.	In place of her husband, George Cave, 1st Viscount Cave, who died 29 March 1928, the day of his resignation as Lord High Chancellor of Great Britain.

== George VI ==
Date	Title		Recipient	Current status	Notes
6 May 1943	(United Kingdom)	Viscountess Daventry	Muriel FitzRoy	Extant	In place of her husband, Edward FitzRoy, who died in office as Speaker of the House of Commons 3 March 1943.

== See also ==
- List of peerages inherited by women
- Women in the House of Lords
  - List of female members of the House of Lords
- Audrey Hylton-Foster, Baroness Hylton-Foster, who was given a life peerage and an annuity in 1965 after her husband, Sir Harry Hylton-Foster, Speaker of the House of Commons, died while in office.
- Pamela Sharples, Baroness Sharples, who was given a life peerage in 1973 after her husband, Sir Richard Sharples, Governor of Bermuda, was murdered while in office.
- Diana Neave, Baroness Airey of Abingdon, who was given a life peerage in 1979 after her husband, Airey Neave, was murdered by an INLA car bomb.
- Elizabeth Smith, Baroness Smith of Gilmorehill, who was given a Life Peerage in 1995 after her husband, the Labour leader John Smith, died in office of a heart attack.
