= Newcomen baronets =

Extinct baronetcy in the Baronetage of Ireland

The Newcomen Baronetcy, of Kenagh in the County of Longford, was a title in the Baronetage of Ireland. It was created on 30 December 1623 for Robert Newcomen. Born in London, the third son of Charles Newcomen and Jane Nightingale, Robert had come to Ireland in the late sixteenth century. He settled at Keenagh in County Longford, where he became a substantial landowner, and sat in the Irish House of Commons for Kilbeggan. By his first wife Katherine Molyneux, daughter of Sir Thomas Molyneux, Chancellor of the Exchequer of Ireland and Catherine Stabeort, he had twenty-one children, including the second, third and fourth Baronets. The fifth baronet was a Jacobite soldier. The sixth, seventh and eighth Baronets also represented County Longford in the Irish House of Commons. The eighth Baronet also represented Longford Borough in Parliament. The title became extinct on his death on 27 April 1789.

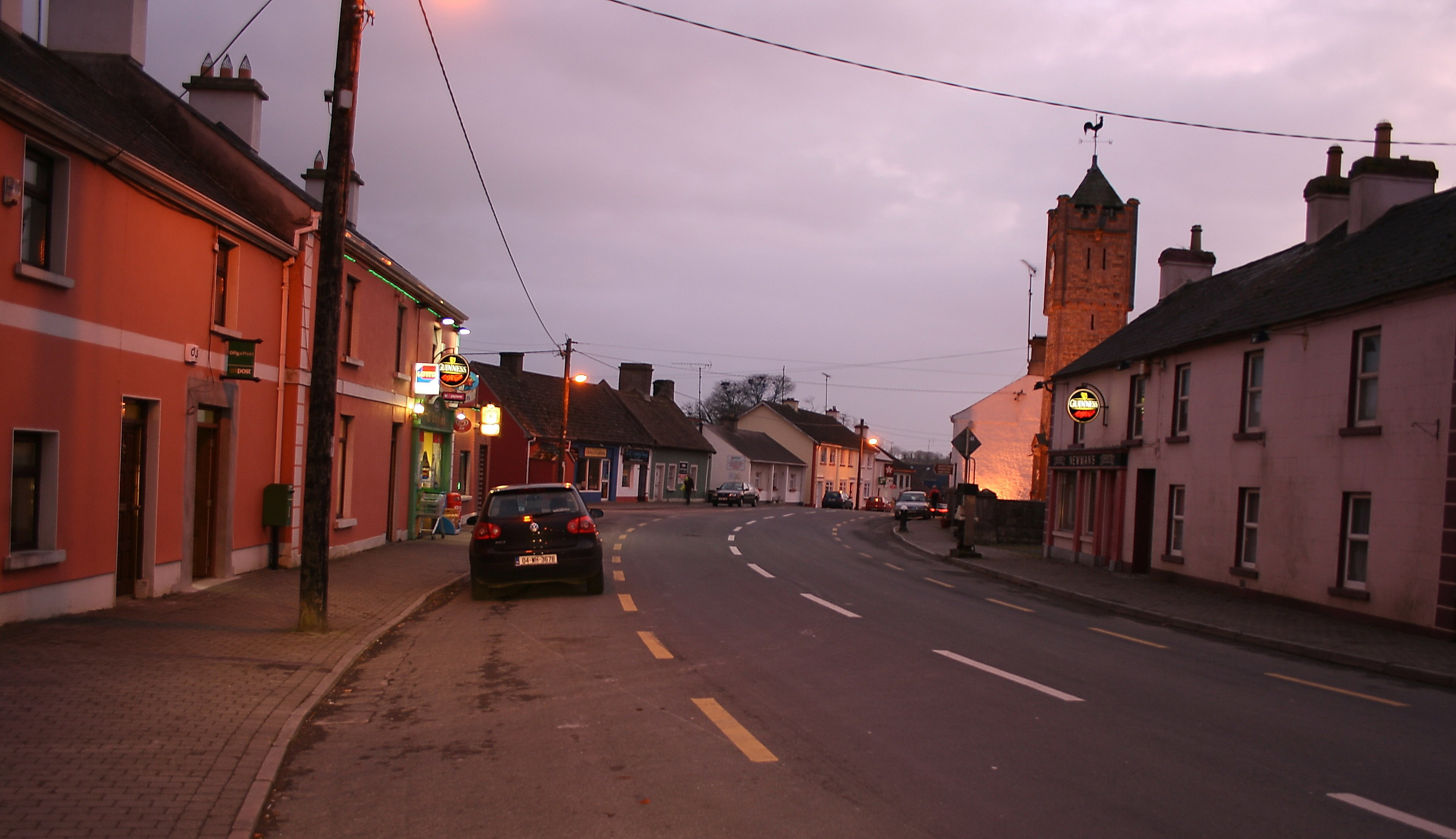
Keenagh, County Longford

Several other members of the family sat in the Irish House of Commons. Brabazon Newcomen, son of Sir Thomas Newcomen, son of the second Baronet, represented Kilbeggan. Thomas Newcomen and Charles Newcomen represented St Johnstown, Longford.

The substantial family estates were inherited by Charlotte Newcomen, only child and heiress of Edward Newcomen, grandson of the sixth Baronet. She was married to William Gleadowe, who assumed the additional surname of Newcomen at the time of their marriage and was created a baronet in 1781. Charlotte was later elevated to the peerage as Baroness and Viscountess Newcomen. See the latter title for more information.

== Newcomen baronets, of Kenagh (1623) ==
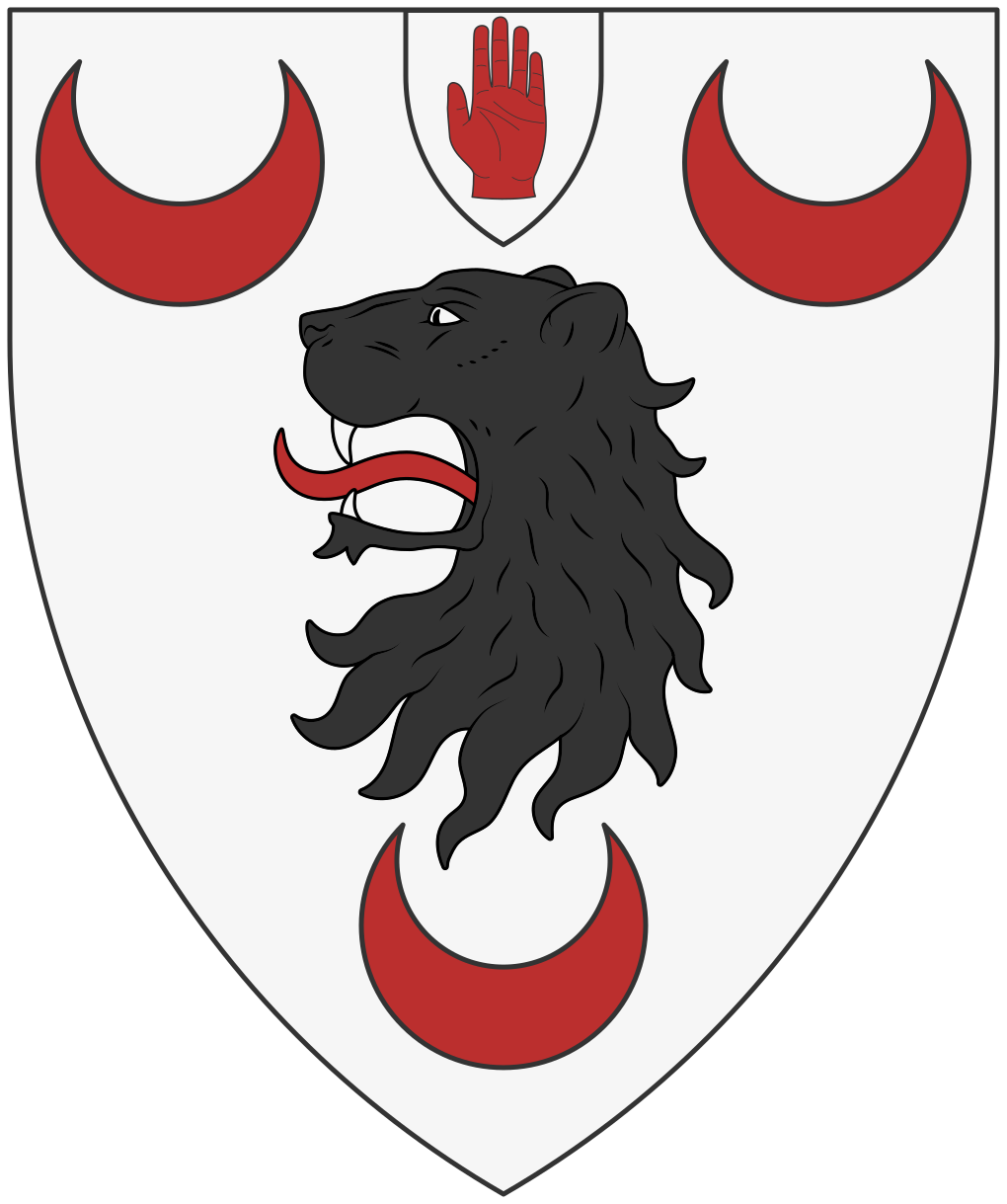
The coat of arms of Newcomen of Kenagh, Baronets.

- Sir Robert Newcomen, 1st Baronet (died 28 September 1629)
- Sir Beverley Newcomen, 2nd Baronet (died 28 April 1637)(d.s.p.m.)
- Sir Thomas Newcomen, 3rd Baronet (died 29 April 1642)(brother of 2nd Bt.)(d.s.p.)
- Sir Robert Newcomen, 4th Baronet (died 12 August 1677)(brother of 2nd & 3rd Bts.)
- Sir Thomas Newcomen, 5th Baronet (died 31 July 1689)
- Sir Robert Newcomen, 6th Baronet (1664 – 6 March 1735)
- Sir Arthur Newcomen, 7th Baronet (1701 – 25 November 1759)
- Sir Thomas Newcomen, 8th Baronet (1740 – 27 April 1789)

== Gleadowe-Newcomen baronets, of Carrickglass (1781) ==
- see Viscount Newcomen
