= Baron Annaly =

Barony in the Peerage of the United Kingdom

Barony of Annaly
- Argent, on a chevron engrailed between three roses gules,, a cross crosslet or
- Creation date: 19 August 1863
- Creation: Third
- Created by: Queen Victoria
- Peerage: Peerage of the United Kingdom
- First holder: Henry White, 1st Baron Annaly
- Present holder: Luke White, 6th Baron Annaly
- Heir apparent: Luke Henry White
- Heir presumptive: Heirs male of the first baron's body lawfully begotten
- Former seat: Luttrellstown Castle
- Motto: Vi et virtute ("By force and courage")

Baron Annaly is a title that has been created three times, twice in the Peerage of Ireland and once in the Peerage of the United Kingdom. Annaly is named after the ancient term for the general locale, which in turn was named after the original ancient king. The third creation is currently extant.

== History ==
The first creation came in the Peerage of Ireland in 1766 when the lawyer and politician John Gore was made Baron Annaly, of Tenelick in the County of Longford. He had previously represented Jamestown and County Longford in the Irish House of Commons and served as Solicitor-General for Ireland from 1760 to 1764. Gore was the son of George Gore, younger son of Sir Arthur Gore, 1st Baronet, whose elder son Paul Gore was the grandfather of Arthur Gore, 1st Earl of Arran. George, like his son, was Attorney General and a High Court judge. Other members of the Gore family include the Gore baronets of Magharabeg, the Barons Harlech and the Earls Temple of Stowe (a title which has come into the family through marriage). On Lord Annaly's death in 1784 the title became extinct.

The second creation came in the Peerage of Ireland in 1789 when Henry Gore was created Baron Annaly, of Tenelick, in the County of Longford. He was the younger brother of John Gore, 1st Baron Annaly of the 1766 creation. Gore had previously represented County Longford and Lanesborough in the Irish House of Commons. On his death in 1793 this title became extinct as well.

The third creation came in the Peerage of the United Kingdom in 1863 when the Liberal politician Henry White was made Baron Annaly, of Annaly and Rathcline in the County of Longford. He had earlier represented County Dublin and County Longford in the House of Commons and also served as Lord Lieutenant of County Longford. White's father Luke White had previously represented County Leitrim in Parliament as a Whig. The first Baron's son, the second Baron, sat as a Liberal Member of Parliament for County Clare, County Longford and Kidderminster and served as a Junior Lord of the Treasury from 1862 to 1866 in the Liberal administrations of Lord Palmerston and Lord Russell. He was also Lord Lieutenant of County Longford.

As of 2017, the title is held by his great-great-grandson, the sixth Baron, who succeeded his father in 1990. He served briefly as a government whip in 1994 in the Conservative government of John Major. However, Lord Annaly lost his seat in the House of Lords after the House of Lords Act of 1999 removed the automatic right of hereditary peers to sit in the upper chamber of Parliament.

The family seat was Luttrellstown Castle, near Clonsilla, Dublin in Republic of Ireland.

== Barons Annaly, first creation (1766) ==
- John Gore, 1st Baron Annaly (1718–1784)

== Barons Annaly, second creation (1789) ==
- Henry Gore, 1st Baron Annaly (1728–1793)

== Barons Annaly, third creation (1863) ==
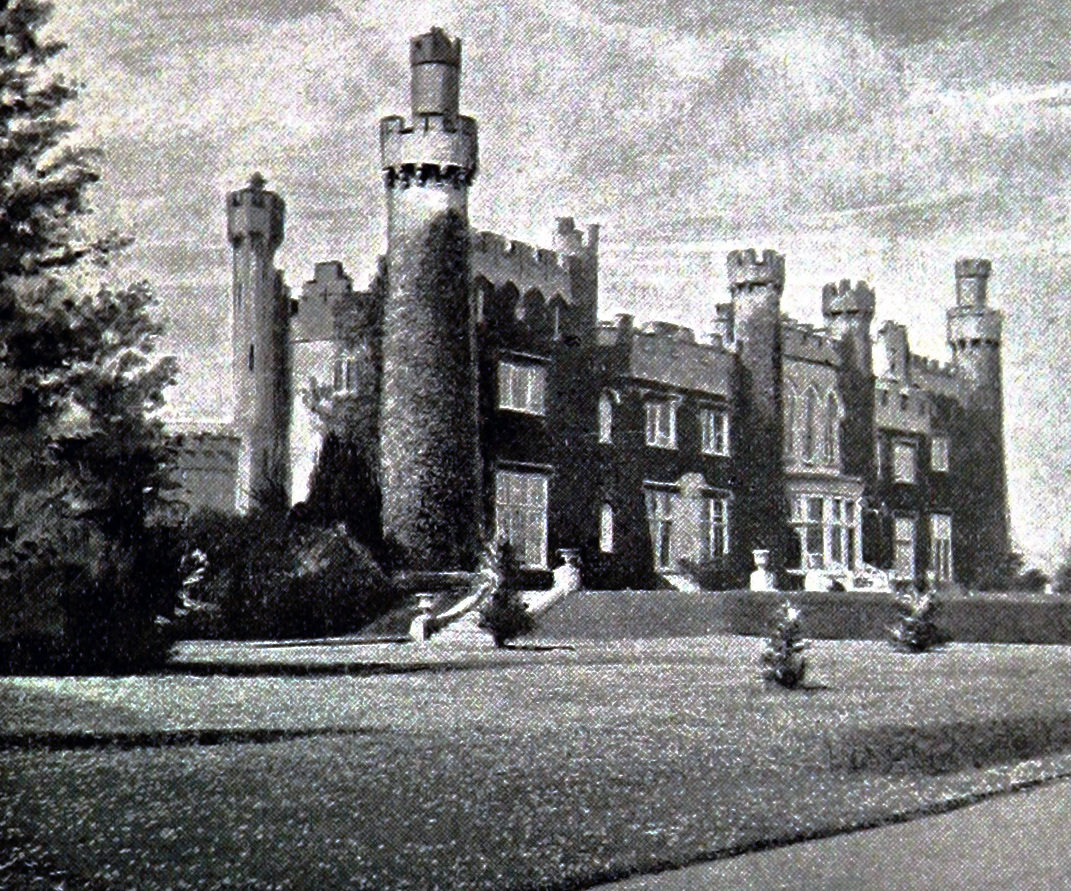
Luttrellstown Castle - the family seat

- Col Henry White, 1st Baron Annaly (1791–1873)
- Luke White, 2nd Baron Annaly (1829–1888)
- Luke White, 3rd Baron Annaly (1857–1922)
- Luke Henry White, 4th Baron Annaly (1885–1970)
- Luke Robert White, 5th Baron Annaly (1927–1990)
- Luke Richard White, 6th Baron Annaly (born 1954)

The heir apparent is the present holder's only son Luke Henry White (born 1990).

== Feudal lords and feudal barons of Annaly, Westmeath and later County Longford ==
In 1552, Edward VI granted lands of Annalye to Baron Delvin including the Holy Island and lands of the O'Ferralls.

In 1556–57, Philip and Mary made grants to Lord Baron Delvin of the northern Annaly region before the county became County Longford.

King James I also granted to Lord Baron Delvin the Island and monastery of Inchemore, otherwise Inismore, in the Annalie.

== See also ==
- Earl of Arran (1762 creation)
- Baron Harlech
- Earl Temple of Stowe
- Gore baronets of Magharabeg
