= Thomas Newcomen (disambiguation) =

Thomas Newcomen was an English inventor.

Thomas Newcomen can also refer to:

- Sir Thomas Newcomen, 5th Baronet
- Thomas Newcomen (MP for St Johnstown)
- Sir Thomas Newcomen, 8th Baronet
