= Mary Boddington =

Irish poet, novelist, and travel writer (1776–1840)

- Born: 1776
- Died: 1840 (aged 63–64)
- Occupation: Writer

Mary Teresa Boddington (née Comerford: 1776 – 1840) was an Irish poet, novelist, travel writer and songwriter.

She was born Mary Comerford in Cork, the daughter of wine merchant Patrick Comerford and Anne Gleadowe, sister of Sir William Gleadowe-Newcomen. In 1805, she married merchant Thomas Boddington. They would have three children, including author Harriet Olivia Boddington. Mary Boddington published two travel books of her time in continental Europe, a collection of stories set there, and a volume of poetry.

Mary Boddington died in 1840, and was buried in Auteuil, Paris on 4 January.

== Bibliography ==
- Slight Reminiscences of the Rhine, Switzerland, and a Corner of Italy. London: Longman, 1834.
- The Gossip's Week. 2 vol. London: Longman, 1836.
- Sketches in the Pyrenees. London: Longman, 1837.
- Poems. London: Longman, 1839.
