= Ambrose Aungier, 2nd Earl of Longford =

Anglo-Irish politician and peer

Ambrose Aungier, 2nd Earl of Longford (c.1649 – 23 January 1704/05) was an Anglo-Irish politician and peer.

Aungier was the third son of Ambrose Aungier (1596-1654) and Grizzell Bulkeley (died 1663), daughter of Lancelot Bulkeley. Between 1697 and 1699 he was the Member of Parliament for Longford Borough in the Irish House of Commons. The Earldom was entailed: the second brother, Gerald Aungier of Bombay (1640-1677), having died long before, on 23 December 1700 Ambrose succeeded his brother, Francis Aungier as Earl of Longford and assumed his seat in the Irish House of Lords. In 1702 he was made a member of the Privy Council of Ireland. Upon his death without issue in 1705, his title became extinct.

Parliament of Ireland
Preceded by John Nicholls; William Wolseley	Member of Parliament for Longford Borough; 1697–1699; With: William Wolseley (1697–1698); Richard Levinge (1698–1699)	Succeeded by Francis Edgeworth; Richard Levinge
Peerage of Ireland
Preceded by Francis Aungier	Earl of Longford; 1700–1705	Extinct
