= Sir Richard Levinge, 1st Baronet =

Irish politician and judge

Sir Richard Levinge, 1st Baronet (2 May 1656 – 13 July 1724) was an Irish politician and judge, who played a leading part in Irish public life for more than 30 years.

== Background ==
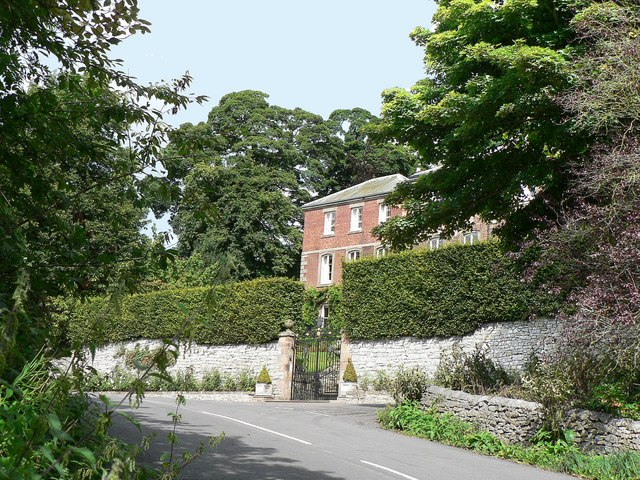
Parwich Hall, the Levinge family home for centuries

Levinge was born at Leek, Staffordshire, the second son of Richard Levinge of Parwich Hall, Derbyshire, Recorder of Chester, and Anne Parker, daughter of George Parker of Staffordshire and his wife Grace Bateman. The Levinges (the name is sometimes spelt Levin) were a long-established Derbyshire family with a tradition of public service. Through his mother he was a first cousin of Thomas Parker, 1st Earl of Macclesfield, Lord High Chancellor of Great Britain.

== Career ==
He was educated at Audlem School, Derbyshire and St John's College, Cambridge. He entered the Inner Temple in 1671 and was called to the Bar in 1678. He was a Member of Parliament of the English House of Commons for Chester from 1690 to 1695. He was also, like his father, Recorder of Chester in 1686/7, but was summarily removed from this office by King James II of England.

He was one of the first to declare for William III of England at the Glorious Revolution, and was sent by the new Government to Ireland as Solicitor-General in 1689. In 1692 he was elected as a member of the Irish House of Commons for Belfast and for Blessington, but chose to sit for Blessington, a seat he held until 1695. During this time he served as Speaker of the Irish House of Commons. In politics he was a moderate Tory, noted throughout his career for his desire to conciliate: in an age of bitter political faction this earned him the uncharitable nickname "Tom Double". Although he supported the Penal Laws (no Irish officeholder then could do otherwise), he was very tolerant in religious matters and had several Roman Catholic friends, including his predecessor as Solicitor-General, Sir Toby Butler.

He later represented Longford Borough from 1698 to September 1713 and Kilkenny City from 1713 to November 1715 in the Irish Parliament. In 1713 he was also returned for Gowran, but chose to sit for Kilkenny.

He also served as Solicitor General for Ireland from 1689, from which office he was dismissed in 1695 following a quarrel with Henry Capell, 1st Baron Capell of Tewkesbury, the Lord Lieutenant of Ireland. He returned to office as Solicitor-General in 1705 through the good offices of James Butler, 2nd Duke of Ormonde, who had acted as his patron for some years past. History repeated itself when the Lord Lieutenant, Thomas Wharton, 1st Earl of Wharton, dismissed him from office in 1709 with what was regarded by many, including Jonathan Swift, as brutal suddenness. He became Attorney General for Ireland in 1711, after Ormonde replaced Wharton as Lord Lieutenant.

He had expressed his interest in being appointed to the English Bench, but met with no success in his efforts to achieve office in England. Under George I of Great Britain, despite being of the "wrong" political persuasion, and his growing age, his famous moderation, and his 30 years experience of Irish public life made him acceptable as an Irish judge to the Government, in which he had a powerful supporter in his cousin Lord Macclesfield. In 1721 he became Chief Justice of the Irish Common Pleas and a member of the Privy Council of Ireland. He complained bitterly of the poor quality of his junior judges, and asked for suitable replacements, although he complained equally about some of those whose names were put forward as possible replacements. Despite being in great pain from gout in his last years, he remained on the Bench until his death.

Levinge was created a Baronet, of High Park in the County of Westmeath, in the Baronetage of Ireland on 26 October 1704. He was once again a member of the Parliament of Great Britain for Derby from 1710 to 1711.

== Family ==
He married firstly in 1683 Mary Corbin, daughter of Gawin Corbin, a wealthy London leather and linen merchant, and had three sons and three daughters. Henry Corbin, the prominent Virginia politician, was a close relative, possibly an elder brother, of Mary's father. Her portrait, by the Swedish painter Michael Dahl, still exists. She died in 1720.

He married secondly in 1723 (though by his own account he was already "old and sick") Mary Johnson, daughter of Robert Johnson, former Baron of the Court of Exchequer (Ireland) and his wife Margaret Dixon, daughter of Sir Richard Dixon, of Calverstown, County Kildare, and had one further son, also named Richard, who was born only a few months before his father's death. Her father was one of her husband's oldest friends, and Levinge had pleaded strongly but without success for his reappointment to the Bench, to sit with him in the Common Pleas. Margaret remarried in 1732 Charles Annesley, a grandson of the Earl of Anglesey, who died in 1746; she died in 1757.

Of the children of his first marriage, Richard and Charles both in turn inherited the baronetcy. Mary married Washington Shirley, 2nd Earl Ferrers, and had three daughters, including the noted religious leader Selina Hastings, Countess of Huntingdon. Dorothy married Sir John Rawdon, 3rd Baronet, and was the mother of John Rawdon, 1st Earl of Moira. After Rawdon's death, she remarried Charles Cobbe, Archbishop of Dublin, and had two more sons, Charles and Thomas. Richard Levinge (1724-1783), the son of the second marriage, lived mainly at Calverstown, presumably as a guest of his cousin Mr Justice Robert Dixon, the last of the Dixon family, and was MP for Duleek 1766–1776.

Sir Richard divided his time between his ancestral home, Parwich Hall, which he bought from his childless elder brother, and his newly acquired property Knockdrin Castle, County Westmeath. Most of his estates passed to his eldest son, who extensively rebuilt Parwich.

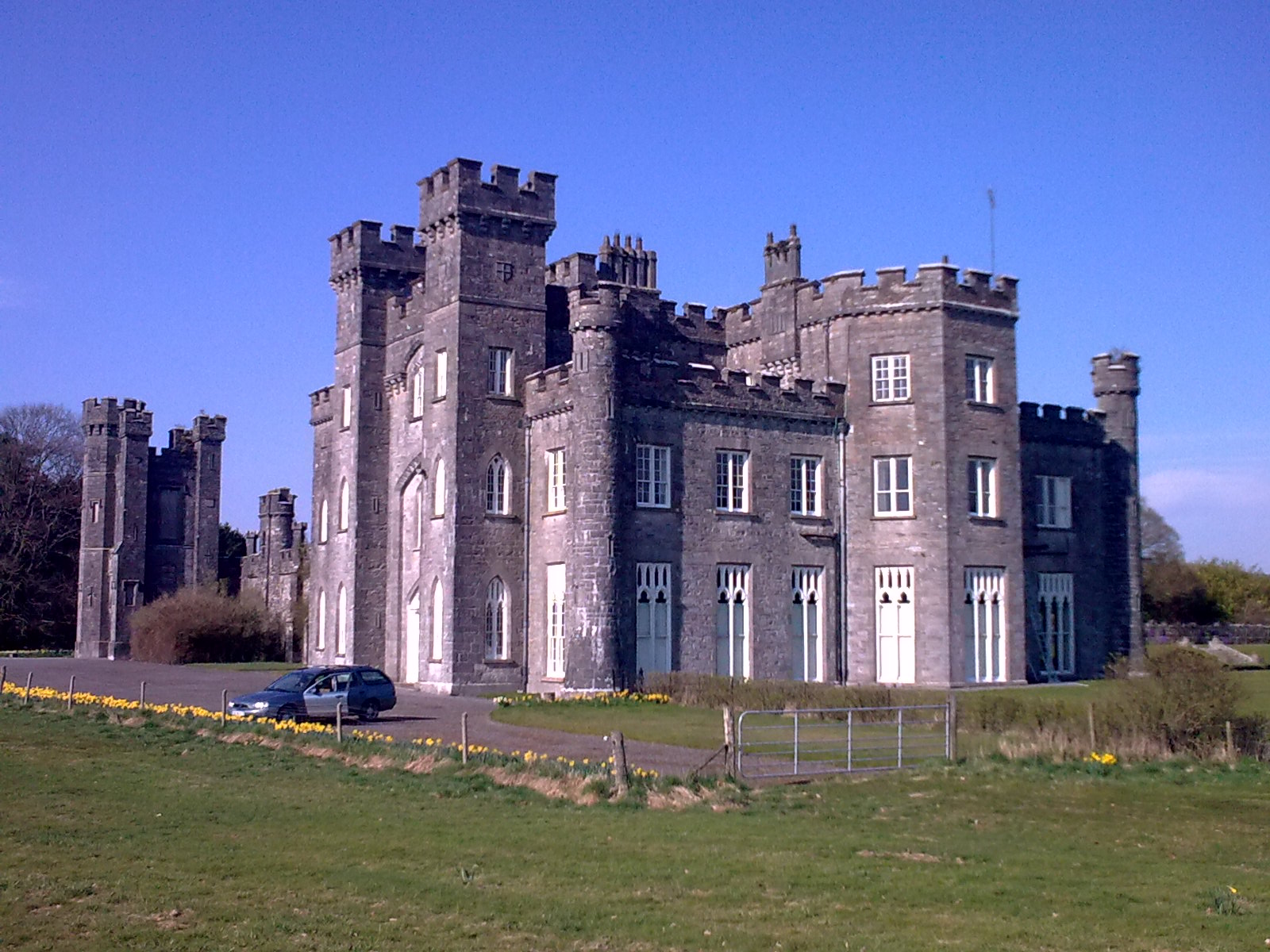
Knockdrin Castle, County Westmeath, the main Levinge residence in Ireland

== Notes ==
Parliament of England
Preceded by George Mainwaring; Roger Whitley	Member of Parliament for Chester; 1690–1695; With: Sir Thomas Grosvenor, Bt	Succeeded by Roger Whitley; Sir Thomas Grosvenor, Bt
Parliament of Ireland
Preceded by James Eustace; Maurice Eustace	Member of Parliament for Blessington; 1692–1695; With: William Crowe	Succeeded by Denny Muschamp; Gideon Delaune
Preceded by Ambrose Aungier; William Wolseley	Member of Parliament for Longford Borough; 1698–1713; With: Ambrose Aungier 1698–1703; Francis Edgeworth 1703–1709; George Gore 1709–1713	Succeeded by George Gore; James Macartney
Preceded by Patrick Wemyss; Sir Robert Maude, Bt	Member of Parliament for Gowran; 1713; With: James Agar	Succeeded by Patrick Wemyss; James Agar
Preceded by Sir Thomas Smyth, Bt; Sir Redmond Everard, Bt	Member of Parliament for Kilkenny City; 1713–1715; With: Darby Egan	Succeeded by Darby Egan; Ebenezer Warren
Parliament of Great Britain
Preceded by Lord James Cavendish; Richard Pye	Member of Parliament for Derby; 1710–1711; With: John Harpur	Succeeded by Edward Mundy; John Harpur
Political offices
Preceded by Sir Richard Nagle	Speaker of the Irish House of Commons; 1692–1695	Succeeded by Robert Rochfort
Baronetage of Ireland
New title	Baronet (of High Park); 1704–1724	Succeeded by Richard Levinge
Legal offices
Preceded by Theobald Butler	Solicitor General for Ireland; 1690-1695	Succeeded by Alan Brodrick
Preceded by Alan Brodrick	Solicitor General for Ireland; 1704-1709	Succeeded by John Forster
Preceded by John Forster	Attorney General for Ireland; 1711–1714	Succeeded by George Gore
Preceded by John Forster	Chief Justice of the Irish Common Pleas; 1720–1724	Succeeded by Thomas Wyndham
