= Richard Liddell =

Irish MP and Chief Secretary for Ireland

Richard Liddell (c. 1694 – 22 June 1746) was an Irish MP and Chief Secretary for Ireland.

He was born the eldest son of Dennis Lyddell of Wakehurst Place, Sussex, one of the Commissioners of the Royal Navy and briefly the MP for Harwich. Richard was educated at Christ Church, Oxford, studied law at the Inner Temple and succeeded his father in 1717. He was a profligate rake and was obliged to make over his inheritance to his younger brother Charles following court judgements against him for adultery.

In 1741 he was elected MP for Bossiney but unseated on petition after a few months. He was, however, reseated on further petition, sitting until his death in 1746.

In 1745 he was made a Privy Counsellor in Ireland and appointed Chief Secretary for Ireland, a position he held until his death. He was also MP for Jamestown in the Parliament of Ireland from 1745 until his death.

He died unmarried.

Political offices
Preceded by Viscount Duncannon	Chief Secretary for Ireland; 1745–1746	Succeeded by Sewallis Shirley
Parliament of Great Britain
Preceded by The Viscount Palmerston; Peregrine Poulett	Member of Parliament for Bossiney; 1741–1741; With: Thomas Foster	Succeeded by John Sabine; Christopher Tower
Preceded by John Sabine; Christopher Tower	Member of Parliament for Bossiney; 1742–1746; With: Thomas Foster	Succeeded by Thomas Foster; William Breton
Parliament of Ireland
Preceded by Robert French; Gilbert King	Member of Parliament for Jamestown; 1745–1746; With: Gilbert King	Succeeded by Gilbert King; John Gore
