= Thomas Gleadowe-Newcomen, 2nd Viscount Newcomen =

Irish politician and banker

Thomas Gleadowe-Newcomen, 2nd Viscount Newcomen (18 September 1776 – 15 January 1825), known as The Honourable Sir Thomas Gleadowe-Newcomen, Bt between 1807 and 1817, was an Irish politician and banker.

== Life ==
Gleadowe-Newcomen was the son of Sir William Gleadowe-Newcomen, 1st Baronet, by Charlotte, only child and heiress of Charles Newcomen, of Carrickglass, County Longford, grandson of Sir Robert Newcomen, 6th Baronet, of Kenagh (see Newcomen Baronets). Charlotte had been created Baroness Newcomen in 1800 and Viscountess Newcomen in 1802, in honour of her husband as well as in recognition of the large estates she had inherited through her father.

He was appointed High Sheriff of Longford for 1801.

Gleadowe-Newcomen succeeded his father as a Knight of the Shire for County Longford in 1802, a seat he held until 1806. He succeeded his father as second Baronet and his mother as second Viscount Newcomen in 1817. However, as this was an Irish peerage, it did not entitle him to a seat in the House of Lords.

Lord Newcomen died in January 1825, aged 48, when all his titles became extinct. He inherited Newcomen Bank but after a banking failure which ruined his own family and many clients in the 1820s, he shot himself in his office.

== Descendants ==
Newcomen never married, but had a long-term relationship with Harriet Holland, who bore him eight children. One of their daughters Theresa Newcomen (1809–1853) married firstly Captain Richard Howe Cockerell RN (1798–1839), a nephew of Sir Charles Cockerell, and had issue three daughters:

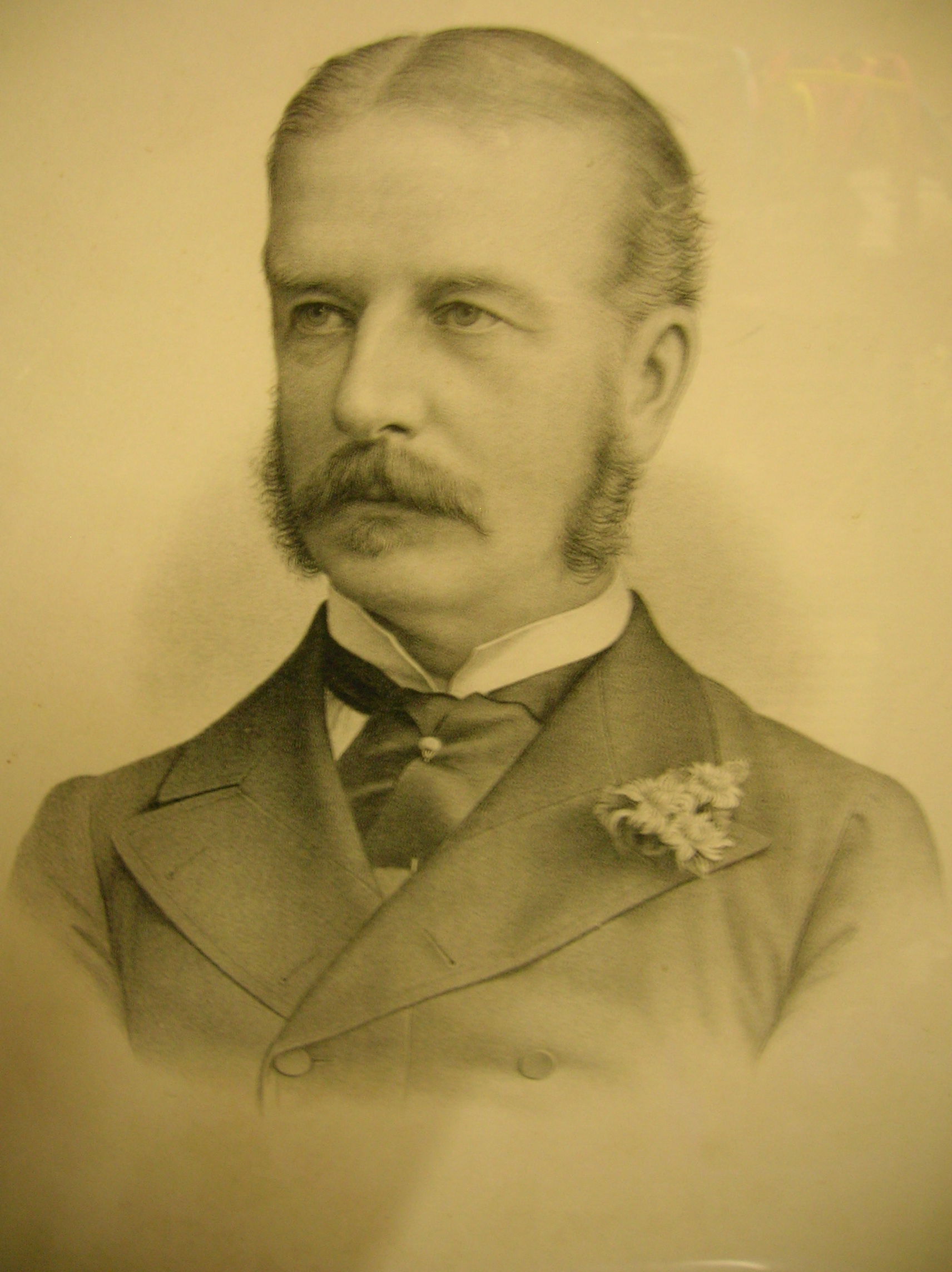
Greville Richard Vernon, son of Lord Lyveden.

- Susan Caroline, Mrs Greville Vernon, wife since 1858 of the Hon Greville Richard Vernon, son of Lord Lyveden. Their grandson became the 5th Baron in 1969, and is ancestor of the present Lord Lyveden.
- Anna Theresa Cockerell, later Countess of Shrewsbury (1836–1912); she married the future earl on 15 February 1855), and is ancestress of all subsequent earls.
- Frederica, Lady North, wife since January 1858 of the 11th Baron North (1836–1932), and ancestress of subsequent barons (this barony however fell into abeyance 1941).

Theresa Cockerell married again 1841 Archibald Montgomerie, 13th Earl of Eglinton as his first wife, and bore him three sons (of whom two succeeded successively to the earldom) and one daughter.

== Links ==
- Profile, archiseek.com; accessed 20 March 2016.

Parliament of the United Kingdom
Preceded by Sir Thomas Fetherston, Bt; Sir William Gleadowe-Newcomen, Bt	Member of Parliament for County Longford; 1802–1806; With: Sir Thomas Fetherston, Bt	Succeeded by Sir Thomas Fetherston, Bt; Viscount Forbes
Baronetage of Ireland
Preceded by William Gleadowe-Newcomen	Baronet (of Carrickglass); 1807–1825	Extinct
Peerage of Ireland
Preceded by Charlotte Gleadowe-Newcomen	Viscount Newcomen; 1817–1825	Extinct
