= James Macartney (1692–1770) =

Irish politician

James Macartney (1692 – 24 March 1770) was an Irish politician.

He was the only son of James Macartney (died 1727), judge of the Court of Common Pleas (Ireland), and his second wife Alice Cuffe, daughter of Sir James Cuffe (died 1678). Through his maternal grandmother Alice Aungier he was coheir to the Earl of Longford.

== Family ==
He married Catherine, the third daughter of the eminent judge Thomas Coote and his third wife Anne Lovett, and niece of Richard Coote, 1st Earl of Bellomont. They had six children, two sons and four daughters, including :

- Francis Macartney MP, who died in 1759, before his father, without issue
- Coote, who died in 1748, without issue
- Martha, who married William Henry Lyttelton, 1st Baron Lyttelton and had issue, including George Lyttelton, 2nd Baron Lyttelton

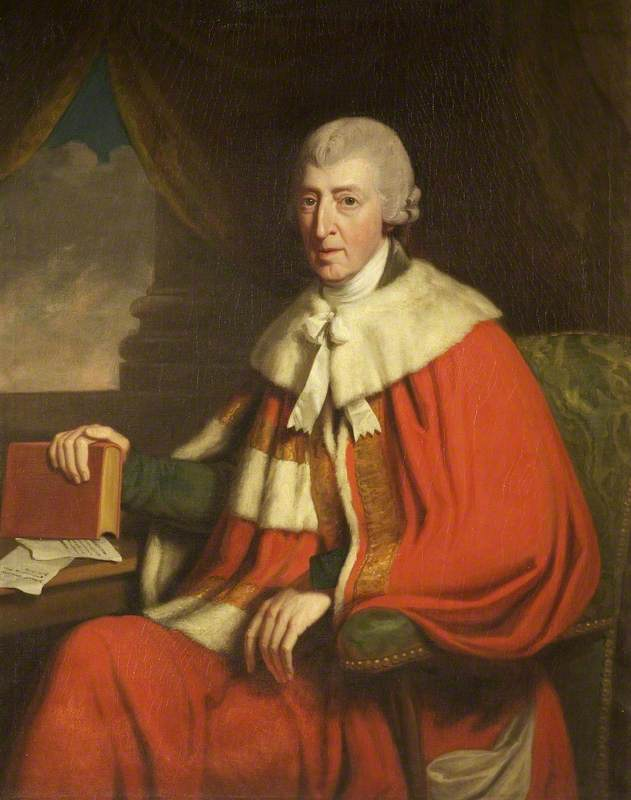
William, 1st Baron Lyttelton, Macartney's son-in-law

- Frances Greville ( c.1724-1789), the poet and author of the "Prayer for Indifference"; she married the politician Fulke Greville and was the mother of four children, including the celebrated political hostess, Frances Anne Crewe and the theatre-manager Henry Francis Greville.

Catherine died in 1731. Since both their sons had died before their father without issue, on James's death in 1770 his estates passed to his daughters and their children.

== Political career ==
He sat in the House of Commons of Ireland from 1713 to 1760, as a Member of Parliament for Longford Borough from 1713 to 1727, and then for Granard from 1727 to 1760.

Parliament of Ireland
Preceded by George Gore; Sir Richard Levinge, Bt	Member of Parliament for Longford Borough; 1713–1727; With: George Gore to 1721; John Folliot 1721–27	Succeeded by Michael Cuffe; Anthony Sheppard
Preceded by Robert Jocelyn; Charles Coote	Member of Parliament for Granard; 1727–1760; With: John Folliot	Succeeded by Robert Sibthorpe; Edmond Malone
