= Marquess of Pembroke =

Title in the Peerage of England

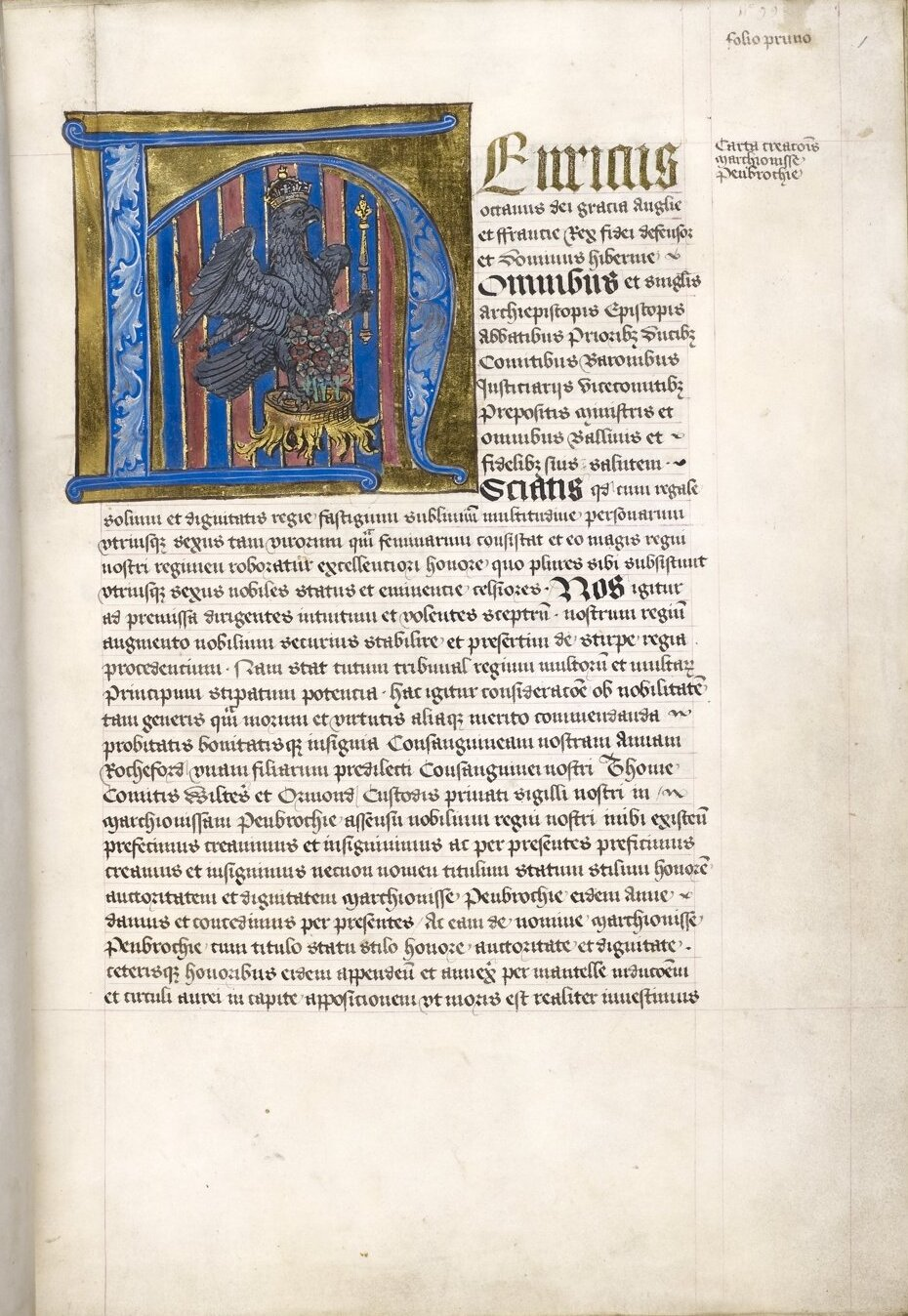
- Letters patent, c. 1532
- Creation date: 1 September 1532
- Created by: Henry VIII of England
- Peerage: Peerage of England
- First holder: Anne Boleyn
- Last holder: Anne Boleyn
- Remainder to: the 1st Marquess' heirs male of the body (whether legitimate or illegitimate)
- Extinction date: disputed between 28 May 1533, 15 May 1536 and 19 May 1536 (see the text)

Marquess of Pembroke was a title in the Peerage of England created by King Henry VIII for his future spouse Anne Boleyn.

== Background ==
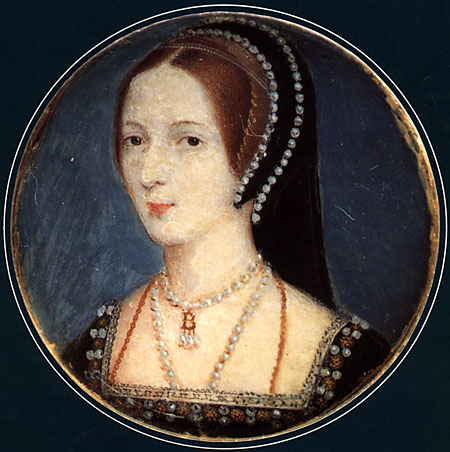
Anne Boleyn, the lady marquis

The then extinct title of Earl of Pembroke had been very significant for the House of Tudor. It was held by Henry VIII's grand-uncle, Jasper Tudor, and it referred to the birthplace of King Henry VII. Henry VIII decided to raise his lover to the dignity of a marquess prior to finally marrying her. He chose to grant her the Marquessate of Pembroke.

== Creation ==
On Sunday, 1 September 1532, Anne Boleyn was granted the Marquessate of Pembroke and land, mostly in Wales, worth over £1,000. The investiture ceremony was performed by Henry VIII himself in Windsor Castle. The ceremony was an elaborate affair, witnessed by the highest ranking peers and clergy in the kingdom, including Thomas Boleyn, 1st Earl of Wiltshire and Thomas Howard, 3rd Duke of Norfolk, Anne's father and uncle respectively; Charles Brandon, 1st Duke of Suffolk (Henry's brother-in-law); Edward Lee, Archbishop of York; John Stokesley, Bishop of London; and Stephen Gardiner, Bishop of Winchester. The French ambassador was also present. The Bishop of Winchester read the patent of creation while Anne knelt before the King who then invested her with the coronet, the robe of estate and the charters of creation and of the lands.

The 16th-century spelling of her title was often marquesse or marquess, sometimes lady marquesse; a feminine, like duchess, of the relatively rare title marquys.

== Succession ==
The marquessate was granted to Anne and her heirs male, but the patent did not include the usual provision that the said heirs male had to be of legitimate birth, thus enabling the title to pass to any illegitimate son Anne might have had. The attending peers did not fail to notice this unusual omission.

== End of the Marquessate ==
It is not clear how the Marquessate of Pembroke ceased to exist. The latest it could have become extinct is upon Anne's death, without male heirs, on 19 May 1536. However, it could have become extinct earlier, either:

- by merging with the Crown (i.e. became indistinct from other property of the Crown) on Anne's marriage to the King being declared valid on 28 May 1533 (similar to the way titles held by the heir to the throne merge into the crown upon accession); or
- by forfeiture of the title upon Anne's 15 May 1536 conviction for high treason.

The effect of the marriage of a peer to a reigning monarch is unclear. Likewise, although forfeiture of titles was a common form of punishment for peers at this time, the historical record is unclear.

== See also ==
- List of peerages created for women
