= Wentworth Parsons =

Anglo-Irish soldier and politician

Wentworth Parsons (25 October 1745 – October 1794) was an Anglo-Irish soldier and politician.

Parsons was the son of Sir Laurence Parsons, 3rd Baronet and Anne Harman. He gained the rank of captain in the British Army. Between 1766 and 1768 he was the Member of Parliament for County Longford in the Irish House of Commons. He married Charlotte Winter, daughter of Paul Winter.

Parliament of Ireland
| Preceded by Ralph Fetherston; Hon. Edward Pakenham | Member of Parliament for County Longford; 1766–1768; With: Ralph Fetherston | Succeeded by Henry Gore; Robert Pakenham |
