= Robert Pakenham =

Anglo-Irish politician (1799–1883)

Robert Pakenham (c. 1744 – 7 July 1775), styled The Honourable from 1756, was an Anglo-Irish politician.

Pakenham was the son of Thomas Pakenham, 1st Baron Longford and Elizabeth Pakenham, 1st Countess of Longford. He gained the rank of captain in the 33rd Regiment of Foot. Pakenham was the Member of Parliament for County Longford in the Irish House of Commons between 1768 and his death in 1775.

Parliament of Ireland
| Preceded by Ralph Fetherston; Wentworth Parsons | Member of Parliament for County Longford; 1768–1775; With: Henry Gore | Succeeded by Henry Gore; Laurence Harman Harman |
