= Luke White, 5th Baron Annaly =

English cricketer

Luke Robert White, 5th Baron Annaly (15 March 1927 – 30 September 1990), was an English first-class cricketer who became a stockbroker.

As the "Hon. L. R. White", Annaly was a good schoolboy cricketer at Eton College and made a century at Lord's for a Public Schools team against a Lord's XI in 1944. He went up to Trinity College, Cambridge, in autumn 1944.

White played a number of non-first-class matches for various teams, including Cambridge University, in 1945. When he scored 132 not out for P. F. Warner's XI in a one-day match against a Second Army team at Lord's on 29 June, The Cricketer commented that he "once again showed that he is one of the batting discoveries of the war". On 14 July he made his first-class debut, playing for an England team in the third of the 1945 Victory Tests against the Australian Services XI, sharing a partnership of 55 with Len Hutton. White played three first-class matches for Middlesex between 1946 and 1947 and made one appearance each for the Marylebone Cricket Club and the Royal Air Force. He also played club cricket for I Zingari. In all, he played six first-class matches between 1945 and 1950, scoring 134 runs at a batting average of 14.88.

After the Second World War, White left Cambridge and joined the Royal Air Force, becoming a fighter pilot. After he left the RAF he took up stockbroking, eventually becoming a director of the City firm Greenwell Montague. He succeeded his father as Baron Annaly in 1970.

Peerage of the United Kingdom
Preceded by Luke Henry White	Baron Annaly; 1970–1990	Succeeded by Luke Richard White
