= Caleb Barnes Harman =

Former Anglo-Irish politician

Caleb Barnes Harman (1772 – 3 January 1796) was an Anglo-Irish politician.

Harman was the Member of Parliament for County Longford in the Irish House of Commons between 1793 and his death in 1796. He was a land agent on the estate of the Harman family and lived at Bawn House, near Moydow. He was fatally shot during a robbery at the house in January 1796.

Parliament of Ireland
Preceded by Sir William Gleadowe-Newcomen, Bt; Laurence Harman Harman	Member of Parliament for County Longford; 1793–1796; With: Sir William Gleadowe-Newcomen, Bt	Succeeded by Sir William Gleadowe-Newcomen, Bt; Sir Thomas Fetherston, Bt
