= Francis Macartney =

Irish politician

Francis Macartney (1716-1759) was a member of the Irish House of Commons.

== Biography ==
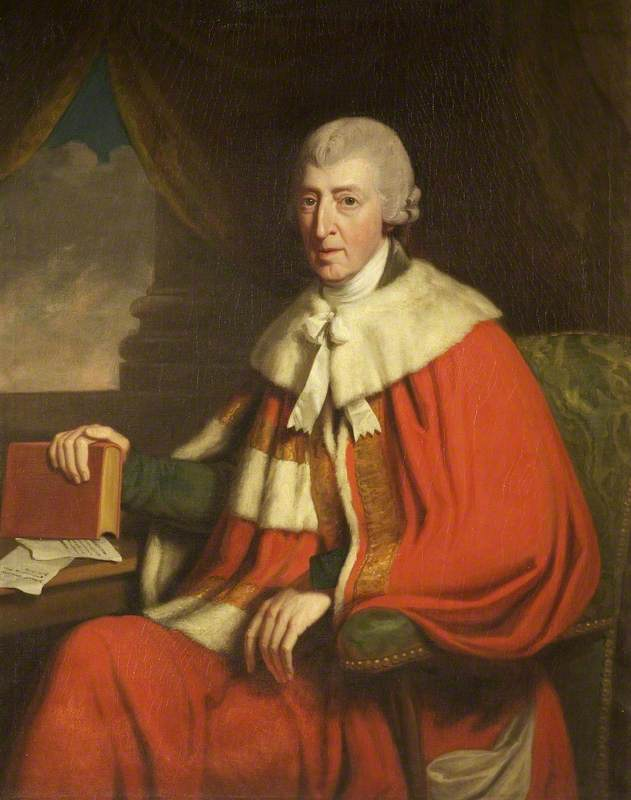
Macartney's brother-in-law, Lord Lyttelton

He was the elder son of James Macartney by his wife Catherine, third daughter of Thomas Coote and his wife Anne Lovett and niece of Richard Coote, 1st Earl of Bellomont. On 7 September 1748 he was married to Henrietta, eldest daughter of Luke Gardiner; they had no children. He was elected to Parliament for Blessington in 1749 and sat until he died in London in January 1759, having predeceased his father. He was buried in St James's Church, Westminster.

Since his only brother Coote had died young, on his father's death the family estate passed to his sisters, who included the celebrated poet Frances Greville, mother of the noted political hostess Frances Anne Crewe, and Martha, who married William Henry Lyttelton, 1st Baron Lyttelton.
