= John Folliot (British Army officer, died 1762) =

Officer of the British Army (1691–1762)

Lieutenant-General John Folliot (or Folliott; baptised 25 January 1691 – 26 February 1762) was an officer of the British Army.

== Biography ==
The eldest son of John Folliott of Ballymacward, Folliot joined the Army as a lieutenant on 1 June 1709. After serving with reputation in the subordinate commissions, he was promoted to the lieutenant-colonelcy of the 1st Regiment of Carabiniers (7th Horse) on 3 July 1737. He was constant in his attention to all the duties of commanding officer of that distinguished corps, and on 15 June 1743 was rewarded with the colonelcy of the 61st Regiment of Foot, from which he was removed on 22 December 1747 to the Royal Irish Regiment. He was promoted to the rank of major-general on 30 March 1754, and in 1756 was appointed major-general on the Staff in Ireland, at a salary of 30 shillings a day; he would hold this post until his death. On 18 January 1758 Folliot was promoted to lieutenant-general. He was Governor of Ross Castle from 1753 until his death. (Note: Williams also states that Folliot was Lieutenant-Governor of Kinsale and Charles Fort from 1753 until he was appointed Governor there in 1761, but these posts were held by Folliot's kinsman of the same name.)

Besides his military career, Folliot sat in the Irish House of Commons for Longford from 1721 to 1727, for Granard from 1727 to 1760, and for Sligo from 1761 to 1762, when he died at Dublin.

Lieutenant-General Folliot had been left the estates of Lickhill and Mitton in Worcestershire by Rebecca, widow of Arthur Lugg and daughter of John Soley by his wife Anne, sister of the last Lord Folliott, as her nearest relative of the name. On the general's death the estates were inherited by his first cousin John Folliott, MP for Kinsale.

== Notes ==
Parliament of Ireland
Preceded by George Gore; James Macartney	Member of Parliament for Longford; 1721–1727; With: James Macartney	Succeeded by Michael Cuffe; Anthony Sheppard
Preceded by Charles Coote; Robert Jocelyn	Member of Parliament for Granard; 1727–1760; With: James Macartney	Succeeded by Edmond Malone; Robert Sibthorpe
Preceded by John Wynne; William Ormsby	Member of Parliament for Sligo; 1761–1762; With: William Ormsby	Succeeded by William Ormsby; Robert Scott
Military offices
Preceded by Edward Richbell	Colonel of Folliot's Regiment of Foot; 1743–1747	Succeeded by Edward Pole
Preceded by John Mordaunt	Colonel of the Royal Irish Regiment of Foot; 1747–1762	Succeeded by Sir John Sebright
