= Laurence Parsons, 1st Earl of Rosse =

Anglo-Irish peer and politician

Lawrence Harman Parsons, 1st Earl of Rosse (26 July 1749 – 20 April 1807), known as The Lord Oxmantown between 1792 and 1795 and as The Viscount Oxmantown between 1795 and 1806, was an Anglo-Irish peer and politician.

== Background ==
Rosse was the second son of Sir Laurence Parsons, 3rd Baronet, of Birr Castle, County Offaly, by his wife Anne, daughter of Wentworth Harman. He inherited the County Longford estates of his uncle the Rev. Cutts Harman, with the proviso that he would adopt the Harman surname (thus becoming Laurence Harman Parsons).

== Political career ==
He was a Member of the Irish House of Commons for County Longford from 1775 to 1792 and for County Longford from 1790 to 1792. In 1792 he was raised to the Peerage of Ireland as Baron of Oxmantown, in the County of Dublin, with remainder to his nephew Sir Lawrence Parsons, 5th Baronet. In 1795 he was made Viscount Oxmantown, of Oxmantown in the County of Dublin, also in the Peerage of Ireland but with normal remainder to the heirs male of his body. Lord Oxmantown was even further honoured in 1806 when he was created Earl of Rosse in the Irish peerage, with similar remainder as for the barony. From 1800 to 1807, he sat in the House of Lords as one of the 28 original Irish representative peers.

== Family ==
Lord Rosse married Lady Jane, daughter of Edward King, 1st Earl of Kingston and Jane Caulfield, in 1772. He died in April 1807, aged 57, when the viscountcy became extinct; he was succeeded in the barony and earldom according to the special remainder by his nephew, Lawrence. Lady Rosse died in January 1838 and the estates were inherited by their only child, Lady Frances (1775 - 1841), wife of Robert King, 1st Viscount Lorton, whose descendants were the King-Harman family of Newcastle House, County Longford.

Parliament of Ireland
Preceded by Henry Gore; Hon. Robert Pakenham	Member of Parliament for County Longford; 1775 – 1792; With: Henry Gore 1775–1790; Sir William Gleadowe-Newcomen, Bt 1790–1792	Succeeded by Sir William Gleadowe-Newcomen, Bt; Caleb Barnes Harman
Parliament of the United Kingdom
New title	Representative peer for Ireland; 1800–1807	Succeeded by The Earl of Kingston
Peerage of Ireland
New creation	Earl of Rosse; 1806–1807	Succeeded by Lawrence Parsons
New creation	Viscount Oxmantown; 1795–1807	Extinct
New creation	Baron Oxmantown; 1792–1807	Succeeded by Lawrence Parsons
