= Sir Ralph Fetherston, 1st Baronet =

Anglo-Irish politician

Sir Ralph Fetherston, 1st Baronet (died May 1780) was an Anglo-Irish politician.

Fetherstone represented County Longford in the Irish House of Commons from 1765 to 1768. Between 1768 and his death in 1780 he represented St Johnstown. On 4 August 1776 he was created a baronet, of Ardagh in the Baronetage of Ireland. On his death his title passed to his son, Thomas Fetherston.

Parliament of Ireland
Preceded by Robert Harman; John Gore	Member of Parliament for County Longford; 1765–1768; With: Hon. Edward Pakenham (1765–1766); Wentworth Parsons (1766–1768)	Succeeded by Henry Gore; Hon. Robert Pakenham
Preceded by George Forbes; Charles Newcomen	Member of Parliament for St Johnstown; 1768–1780; With: Charles Newcomen (1768–1773); Robert Jephson (1773–1776); Hon. John Vaughan (1776–1780)	Succeeded by Sackville Hamilton; Hon. John Vaughan
Baronetage of Ireland
New creation	Baronet (of Ardagh); 1776–1780	Succeeded by Thomas Fetherston
