= Longford Borough (Parliament of Ireland constituency) =

Pre-1801 Irish constituency

Longford
- Former borough constituency for the Irish House of Commons
- County: County Longford
- Borough: Longford

–1801
- Seats: 2
- Replaced by: Disfranchised

Longford was a constituency represented in the Irish House of Commons until 1800.

== Members of Parliament ==
=== 1692–1801 ===
Election	First MP		Second MP
1692	Captain John Nicholls		Colonel William Wolseley
1697	Ambrose Aungier		Colonel William Wolseley
1698	Ambrose Aungier		Sir Richard Levinge
1703	Francis Edgeworth		Sir Richard Levinge
1709	George Gore		Sir Richard Levinge
1713	George Gore		James Macartney
1721	John Folliott		James Macartney
1727	Michael Cuffe		Anthony Sheppard
1737	Michael Cuffe		Richard Edgeworth
1745	Thomas Pakenham		Richard Edgeworth
1757	Roger Hall		Richard Edgeworth
1761	Sir Thomas Newcomen, 8th Bt		Joseph Henry
1768	Henry Flood	Irish Patriot Party	David La Touche
1769	Warden Flood		David La Touche
1776	John Tunnadine		David La Touche
October 1783	Hon. Thomas Pakenham		Hon. Hercules Rowley
1783	Hon. Thomas Pakenham		Henry Stewart
1790	Thomas Taylour, Viscount Headfort		Hon. Hercules Rowley
1791	Thomas Taylour, Viscount Headfort		Henry Stewart
1794	Thomas Pepper		Henry Stewart
1798	Hon. Thomas Pakenham		Henry Stewart
1799	Hon. Thomas Pakenham		Hon. Edward Pakenham
1800	Hon. Thomas Pakenham		Thomas Borrowes
