= Viscount Newcomen =

The coat of arms of the Gleadowe-Newcomens.

Viscount Newcomen, of Mosstown in the County of Longford, was a title in the Peerage of Ireland. It was created in 1803 (as Viscountess Newcomen) for Charlotte Gleadowe-Newcomen, Baroness Newcomen. She had already been made Baroness Newcomen, of Mosstown in the County of Longford, in 1800, also in the Peerage of Ireland. She was the wife of William Gleadowe-Newcomen, who represented County Longford in both the Irish and British House of Commons. In 1781 he was created a Baronet, of Carrickglass in the County of Longford, in the Baronetage of Ireland. Lady Newcomen was the only child and heiress of Edward Newcomen, of Carrickglass, County Longford, grandson of Sir Robert Newcomen, 6th Baronet, of Kenagh (see Newcomen Baronets). At the extinction of the Newcomen baronetcy in 1789, the substantial family estates devolved on the future Lady Newcomen. Her husband was born William Gleadowe, but assumed at the time of their marriage the additional surname of Newcomen. Sir William and Lady Newcomen were both succeeded by their son, the second Baronet and second Viscount. He sat as Member of Parliament for County Longford in the British House of Commons. The titles became extinct on his death in 1825.

== Gleadowe-Newcomen Baronets, of Carrickglass (1781) ==
- Sir William Gleadowe-Newcomen, 1st Baronet (died 1807)
- Sir Thomas Gleadowe-Newcomen, 2nd Baronet (1776–1825) (succeeded as Viscount Newcomen in 1817)

== Viscounts Newcomen (1803) ==
- Charlotte Gleadowe-Newcomen, 1st Viscountess Newcomen (died 1817)
- Thomas Gleadowe-Newcomen, 2nd Viscount Newcomen (1776–1825)

Coat of arms of Viscountess Newcomen
Crest A cock or Escutcheon Quarterly, 1st & 4th, az. three lozenges conjoined in fess ar. (GLEADOWE); 2nd & 3rd, ar. a lion's head erased sa. langued gu. betw. three crescents of the second (NEWCOMEN) Supporters Dexter, a brown horse : sinister, a talbot, both ppr. and semee of crescents gu. Motto Vigilant
