= 2007 Cherwell District Council election =

2007 UK local government election

Results of the 2007 Cherwell District Council election

The 2007 Cherwell District Council election took place on 3 May 2007 to elect members of Cherwell District Council in Oxfordshire, England. One third of the council was up for election and the Conservative Party stayed in overall control of the council.

In all 16 seats were contested with one Independent candidate, David Chapman, standing in Ambrosden and Chesterton ward after resigning from the Conservative party in protest at plans to build 1,585 houses near Bicester. The results saw the Conservatives strengthen their control of the council going from 39 to 42 seats. They gained three seats from Labour in Banbury Ruscote, Kidlington South and Yarnton, Gosford and Water Eaton wards. Consequently, Labour only managed to hold on to one of their seats in Bicester West. The Conservatives also gained one seat from the Liberal Democrats in The Astons and Heyfords, but lost Bicester South back to them by one vote. The results meant that Labour and the Liberal Democrats only had 4 seats each in opposition on the council.

After the election, the composition of the council was:

- Conservative 42
- Labour 4
- Liberal Democrat 4

== Election result ==
Cherwell local election result 2007
| Party | Seats | Gains | Losses | Net gain/loss | Seats % | Votes % | Votes | +/− |
|---|---|---|---|---|---|---|---|---|
| Conservative | 13 | 4 | 1 | +3 | 81.3 | 57.0 | 13,112 | -3.2% |
| Liberal Democrats | 2 | 1 | 1 | 0 | 12.5 | 20.5 | 4,717 | -4.3% |
| Labour | 1 | 0 | 3 | -3 | 6.3 | 18.9 | 4,356 | +4.6% |
| UKIP | 0 | 0 | 0 | 0 | 0 | 1.9 | 438 | +1.9% |
| Independent | 0 | 0 | 0 | 0 | 0 | 1.6 | 376 | +1.6% |

== Ward results ==
Ambrosden & Chesterton
| Party | Candidate | Votes | % | ±% |
|---|---|---|---|---|
| Conservative | Andrew Fulljames | 435 | 48.3 | −25.3 |
| Independent | David Chapman | 376 | 41.7 | +41.7 |
| Liberal Democrats | Neil Walton | 90 | 10.0 | −16.4 |
| Majority | | 59 | 6.6 | −40.6 |
| Turnout | | 901 | 37.0 | |
| Conservative hold | | Swing | | |

Banbury Easington
| Party | Candidate | Votes | % | ±% |
|---|---|---|---|---|
| Conservative | Nigel Morris | 1,240 | 61.1 | −3.0 |
| Labour | Bruce Lucas | 396 | 19.5 | +1.5 |
| Liberal Democrats | Bruce Shakespeare | 216 | 10.6 | −7.3 |
| UKIP | Lynne Shawyer | 178 | 8.8 | +8.8 |
| Majority | | 844 | 41.6 | −4.5 |
| Turnout | | 2,030 | 34.7 | |
| Conservative hold | | Swing | | |

Banbury Grimsbury & Castle
| Party | Candidate | Votes | % | ±% |
|---|---|---|---|---|
| Conservative | Christopher Smithson | 1,015 | 61.7 | +11.5 |
| Labour | Henry Goodman | 631 | 38.3 | +8.0 |
| Majority | | 384 | 23.4 | +3.5 |
| Turnout | | 1,646 | 25.5 | |
| Conservative hold | | Swing | | |

Banbury Hardwick
| Party | Candidate | Votes | % | ±% |
|---|---|---|---|---|
| Conservative | Nicholas Turner | 841 | 61.6 | +1.7 |
| Labour | Roy Mold | 249 | 18.2 | −8.1 |
| Liberal Democrats | John Willett | 146 | 10.7 | −3.2 |
| UKIP | John Brown | 130 | 9.5 | +9.5 |
| Majority | | 592 | 43.4 | +9.8 |
| Turnout | | 1,366 | 24.0 | |
| Conservative hold | | Swing | | |

Banbury Ruscote
| Party | Candidate | Votes | % | ±% |
|---|---|---|---|---|
| Conservative | Keith Strangwood | 764 | 49.1 | +10.6 |
| Labour | Martin Weir | 569 | 36.6 | −14.9 |
| UKIP | Mark Clifton | 130 | 8.4 | +8.4 |
| Liberal Democrats | Andrew Murray | 92 | 5.9 | −4.1 |
| Majority | | 195 | 12.5 | |
| Turnout | | 1,555 | 27.0 | |
| Conservative gain from Labour | | Swing | | |

Bicester East
| Party | Candidate | Votes | % | ±% |
|---|---|---|---|---|
| Conservative | Rose Stratford | 773 | 60.2 | +4.6 |
| Labour | John Broad | 319 | 24.8 | −19.6 |
| Liberal Democrats | Martin Chadwick | 192 | 15.0 | +15.0 |
| Majority | | 454 | 35.4 | +24.2 |
| Turnout | | 1,284 | 29.5 | |
| Conservative gain from Labour | | Swing | | |

Bicester North
| Party | Candidate | Votes | % | ±% |
|---|---|---|---|---|
| Conservative | Carol Steward | 881 | 71.0 | +6.8 |
| Liberal Democrats | Stephen Creed | 187 | 15.1 | −20.7 |
| Labour | Chris Bream | 172 | 13.9 | +13.9 |
| Majority | | 694 | 55.9 | +27.5 |
| Turnout | | 1,240 | 25.5 | |
| Conservative hold | | Swing | | |

Bicester South
| Party | Candidate | Votes | % | ±% |
|---|---|---|---|---|
| Liberal Democrats | Nicholas Cotter | 600 | 50.0 | +5.0 |
| Conservative | Lawrie Stratford | 599 | 50.0 | −5.0 |
| Majority | | 1 | 0.0 | |
| Turnout | | 1,199 | 32.3 | |
| Liberal Democrats gain from Conservative | | Swing | | |

Bicester Town
| Party | Candidate | Votes | % | ±% |
|---|---|---|---|---|
| Conservative | Diana Edwards | 698 | 58.5 | −4.8 |
| Labour | Claudine Thompson | 276 | 23.1 | −13.6 |
| Liberal Democrats | Liz Yardley | 220 | 18.4 | +18.4 |
| Majority | | 422 | 35.4 | +8.8 |
| Turnout | | 1,194 | 30.3 | |
| Conservative hold | | Swing | | |

Bicester West
| Party | Candidate | Votes | % | ±% |
|---|---|---|---|---|
| Labour | Leslie Sibley | 1,069 | 53.0 | +22.5 |
| Conservative | Adam Collyer | 949 | 47.0 | −22.5 |
| Majority | | 120 | 6.0 | |
| Turnout | | 2,018 | 36.1 | |
| Labour hold | | Swing | | |

Cropredy
| Party | Candidate | Votes | % | ±% |
|---|---|---|---|---|
| Conservative | Ken Atack | 851 | 76.3 | +2.0 |
| Liberal Democrats | Anthony Burns | 264 | 23.7 | −2.0 |
| Majority | | 587 | 52.6 | +4.0 |
| Turnout | | 1,115 | 51.0 | |
| Conservative hold | | Swing | | |

Hook Norton
| Party | Candidate | Votes | % | ±% |
|---|---|---|---|---|
| Conservative | Victoria Irvine | 610 | 71.7 | −5.9 |
| Liberal Democrats | Peter Davis | 241 | 28.3 | +5.9 |
| Majority | | 369 | 43.4 | −11.8 |
| Turnout | | 851 | 41.8 | |
| Conservative hold | | Swing | | |

Kidlington North
| Party | Candidate | Votes | % | ±% |
|---|---|---|---|---|
| Liberal Democrats | John Wyse | 711 | 50.2 | −9.5 |
| Conservative | Michael Hunt | 549 | 38.8 | −1.5 |
| Labour | Martin Keighery | 155 | 11.0 | +11.0 |
| Majority | | 162 | 11.4 | −8.0 |
| Turnout | | 1,415 | 34.0 | |
| Liberal Democrats hold | | Swing | | |

Kidlington South
| Party | Candidate | Votes | % | ±% |
|---|---|---|---|---|
| Conservative | Neil Prestidge | 1,008 | 44.3 | +9.8 |
| Liberal Democrats | Philip Rawlins | 749 | 32.9 | −11.7 |
| Labour | Catherine Arakelian | 520 | 22.8 | +7.9 |
| Majority | | 259 | 11.4 | |
| Turnout | | 2,277 | 35.7 | |
| Conservative gain from Labour | | Swing | | |

The Astons & Heyfords
| Party | Candidate | Votes | % | ±% |
|---|---|---|---|---|
| Conservative | Luke Annaly | 960 | 61.6 | −11.6 |
| Liberal Democrats | Richard Makepeace | 598 | 38.4 | +11.6 |
| Majority | | 362 | 23.2 | −21.2 |
| Turnout | | 1,558 | 41.5 | |
| Conservative gain from Liberal Democrats | | Swing | | |

Yarnton, Gosford & Water Eaton
| Party | Candidate | Votes | % | ±% |
|---|---|---|---|---|
| Conservative | Michael Gibbard | 939 | 69.6 | +22.4 |
| Liberal Democrats | Suzanne Wilson-Higgins | 411 | 30.4 | −13.0 |
| Majority | | 528 | 39.2 | +35.4 |
| Turnout | | 1,350 | 36.5 | |
| Conservative hold | | Swing | | |
