= Luke White, 6th Baron Annaly =

British Army officer and politician (born 1954)

The Right Honourable The Lord Annaly

Member of the House of Lords Lord Temporal
- In office 16 April 1991 – 11 November 1999
- Preceded by: The 5th Baron Annaly
- Succeeded by: Seat abolished

Personal details
- Born: Luke Richard White; 29 June 1954 (age 72)
- Party: Conservative
- Parent: Luke White, 5th Baron Annaly (father)
- Education: Eton
- Occupation: Army officer
- Known for: Lord-in-Waiting

Luke Richard White, 6th Baron Annaly (born 1954), is a British hereditary peer and former Government Whip in the House of Lords, who sat on the Conservative benches.

== Background and education ==
Lord Annaly is the only son of the first-class cricketer, the 5th Baron Annaly, and Lady Marye Isabel Pepys (died 1958), eldest daughter of the 7th Earl of Cottenham. His paternal grandmother was Lady Lavinia Spencer, daughter of the 6th Earl Spencer, therefore, he is the second cousin of Diana, Princess of Wales and a second cousin once removed of William, Prince of Wales, and Prince Harry, Duke of Sussex. His parents divorced in 1956 when he was two.

Educated at Eton College and the Royal Military Academy Sandhurst, he later attended the Royal Agricultural College, Cirencester, receiving a Diploma in Rural Estate Management.

White joined the Royal Hussars becoming Lieutenant in 1974, and served in Northern Ireland.

Lord Annaly succeeded upon his father's death on 30 September 1990 as a Baron in the Peerage of the United Kingdom, a title created in 1863.

== Family ==
Lord Annaly married Caroline Nina Garnett (born 1960), younger daughter of Colonel Robert Hugh Garnett MBE and Elizabeth Ann Arthur, in 1983. They have four children, including an only son and heir apparent, Luke Henry White (born 1990); their daughters are Lavinia Marye (born 1987), Iona Elizabeth (born 1989) and Clementine Isabel 'Clemmie' White (born 2001).

After divorcing, the Lady Annaly married secondly, in 2015, Richard Bott FCA.

== Politics ==
House of Lords

Appointed a Lord-in-Waiting in 1994, Lord Annaly served as a Lords' Whip in the Conservative government of John Major with responsibility for the Home Office and Ministry of Defence. With the passage of the Act of 1999, Annaly along with almost all other hereditary peers lost his automatic right to sit in the House of Lords.

At pro-hunting demonstrations in September 2004 Annaly spoke to the BBC in favour of continuation of hunting, stating it is no longer an elitist activity; "I fear it is being done for good, old-fashioned misconceived ideas about the sort of people who go hunting. People have come from all over the country and all sections of society. It's no longer a privileged exclusive activity."

District Council

From 2007 to 2011, Lord Annaly was councillor for the Astons & Heyfords ward of Cherwell District Council, representing the Conservatives and defeating the incumbent Liberal Democrat councillor.

== Subsequent career ==
Lord Annaly serves on his local (ecclesiastical) Parochial Church Council as Church Warden and is elected to the Anglican Oxford Deanery Synod.

An Officer of the Order of St John, he is a member of Marylebone Cricket Club, a Freeman of the Haberdashers' Company and a steward for the British Horseracing Authority at Wolverhampton, Warwick and Towcester racecourses.

== See also ==
- Baron Annaly
- Earl of Bantry

Peerage of the United Kingdom
Preceded by Luke White	Baron Annaly; 1990–present Member of the House of Lords (1991–1999)	Incumbent; Heir presumptive: Luke White
Court offices
Preceded by	Lord-in-Waiting to HM The Queen; 1994–1997	Succeeded by
