= Sir Arthur Newcomen, 7th Baronet =

Anglo-Irish politician

Sir Arthur Newcomen, 7th Baronet (1701 – 25 November 1759) was an Anglo-Irish politician.

Newcomen was the son of Sir Robert Newcomen, 6th Baronet and succeeded to his father's title on 6 March 1735. He was the Member of Parliament for County Longford in the Irish House of Commons between 1735 and his death in 1759.

Parliament of Ireland
Preceded by Sir Robert Newcomen, Bt; Anthony Sheppard	Member of Parliament for County Longford; 1735–1759; With: Anthony Sheppard (1635–1739); Arthur Gore (1739–1758); Henry Gore (1758–1759)	Succeeded by Henry Gore; Sir Thomas Newcomen, Bt
Baronetage of Ireland
Preceded by Robert Newcomen	Baronet (of Kenagh); 1735–1759	Succeeded by Thomas Newcomen
