= Henry Gore, 1st Baron Annaly =

Anglo-Irish politician and peer

Henry Gore, 1st Baron Annaly (8 March 1728 – 5 June 1793) was an Anglo-Irish politician and peer.

== Biography ==
Gore was the third son of George Gore and Bridget Sankey. One of his elder brothers was John Gore, who was created Baron Annaly (first creation) in 1766.

Between 1758 and 1760, Gore was the Member of Parliament for County Longford in the Irish House of Commons. He then represented Lanesborough between 1761 and 1768, before sitting again for County Longford from 1768 and 1789. He was High Sheriff of Longford in 1765 and held the office of Examiner of Customs in 1770. On 23 September 1789, he was created Baron Annaly, of Tenelick in the Peerage of Ireland, a revival of the title created for his deceased brother, and assumed his seat in the Irish House of Lords.

He married Mary Smyth, daughter of Skeffington Randal Smyth and Mary Moore, on 4 August 1764. He died without children in 1793, at which point his title became extinct.

Parliament of Ireland
Preceded by Arthur Gore; Sir Arthur Newcomen, Bt	Member of Parliament for County Longford; 1758–1760; With: Sir Arthur Newcomen, Bt (1758–1759); Sir Thomas Newcomen, Bt (1758–1760)	Succeeded by Robert Harman; John Gore
Preceded by Anthony Marlay; John Hely-Hutchinson	Member of Parliament for Lanesborough; 1761–1768; With: William Harward	Succeeded by William Harward; Matthias Earbery
Preceded by Ralph Fetherston; Wentworth Parsons	Member of Parliament for County Longford; 1768–1789; With: Hon. Robert Pakenham (1768–1775); Laurence Harman Harman (1775–1789)	Succeeded by Sir William Gleadowe-Newcomen, Bt; Laurence Harman Harman
Peerage of Ireland
New creation	Baron Annaly; 1789–1793	Extinct
