= Sir Robert Newcomen, 6th Baronet =

Anglo-Irish politician and baronet

Sir Robert Newcomen, 6th Baronet (1664 – 6 March 1735) was an Anglo-Irish politician.

Newcomen succeeded to his father's baronetcy in 1689. He represented County Longford in the Irish House of Commons between 1692 and his death in 1735.

Parliament of Ireland
Preceded by Patriot Parliament	Member of Parliament for County Longford; 1692–1735; With: Robert Choppin (1692–1695); Wentworth Harman (1695–1703); Anthony Sheppard (1703–1713); Henry Edgeworth (1713–1715); Anthony Sheppard (1715–1735)	Succeeded by Anthony Sheppard; Sir Arthur Newcomen, Bt
Baronetage of Ireland
Preceded by Thomas Newcomen	Baronet (of Kenagh); 1689–1735	Succeeded by Arthur Newcomen
