= Sir Thomas Newcomen, 5th Baronet =

Anglo-Irish baronet and Jacobite soldier

Sir Thomas Newcomen, 5th Baronet of Kenagh, co. Longford (died 31 July 1689) was an Anglo-Irish baronet and Jacobite soldier.

Thomas was the son of Sir Robert Newcomen, 4th Baronet and Anne Boleyn. He was knighted, before his father, in 1664, by the Lord Lieutenant of Ireland. In 1676 he was made a member of the Privy Council of Ireland. He inherited his father's baronetcy on 12 August 1677. He was an adherent of James II of England following the Glorious Revolution, and was Colonel of Newcomen’s Regiment of Foot during the Williamite War in Ireland. He was killed in fighting near Enniskillen at the Battle of Newtownbutler in 1689.

He was succeeded in the baronetcy by his son by his second wife, Robert Newcomen. His daughter, Catherine, married Simon Luttrell.

Baronetage of Ireland
Preceded by Robert Newcomen	Baronet (of Kenagh); 1677–1689	Succeeded by Robert Newcomen
