= Countess of Winchilsea =

Countess of Winchilsea is a title given to the wife of the Earl of Winchilsea. Women who have held the title include:

- Elizabeth Finch, 1st Countess of Winchilsea (1556–1634)
- Anne Finch, Countess of Winchilsea (1661–1720)
- Essex Finch, Countess of Nottingham (c. 1652–1684)
- Frances Finch, Countess of Winchilsea and Nottingham (c. 1690–1734)
- Georgiana Finch-Hatton, Countess of Winchilsea (1791–1835)
- Emily Georgiana Finch-Hatton, Countess of Winchilsea (1809–1848)
- Fanny-Margaretta Finch-Hatton, Countess of Winchilsea (1820–1909)
- Constance Finch-Hatton, Countess of Winchilsea (1823–1878)
- Margaretta Finch-Hatton, Countess of Winchilsea (1885–1952)
