= Robert French (Irish judge) =

Irish court of common pleas judge

Robert French (1690 – 29 May 1772) was an Irish judge of the Court of Common Pleas. He was extremely unpopular with his colleagues, who thought poorly of him both as a lawyer and a judge.

He was born in Liverpool, and grew up in Dungar, now Frenchpark, County Roscommon. He was the second son of the wealthy landowner Colonel John French, who was nicknamed An Tiarna Mór (the Great Lord). Colonel French was the eldest son of Dominick French and his wife Anne King, daughter of John King and Sarah Conway, and granddaughter of Edward King, Bishop of Elphin. Robert's mother was Anne Gore, daughter of Sir Arthur Gore, 1st Baronet and his wife Eleanor St. George. While his father's wealth and connections no doubt helped him in his career, he also owed much to his mother's family, in particular his uncle George Gore, justice of the Court of Common Pleas.

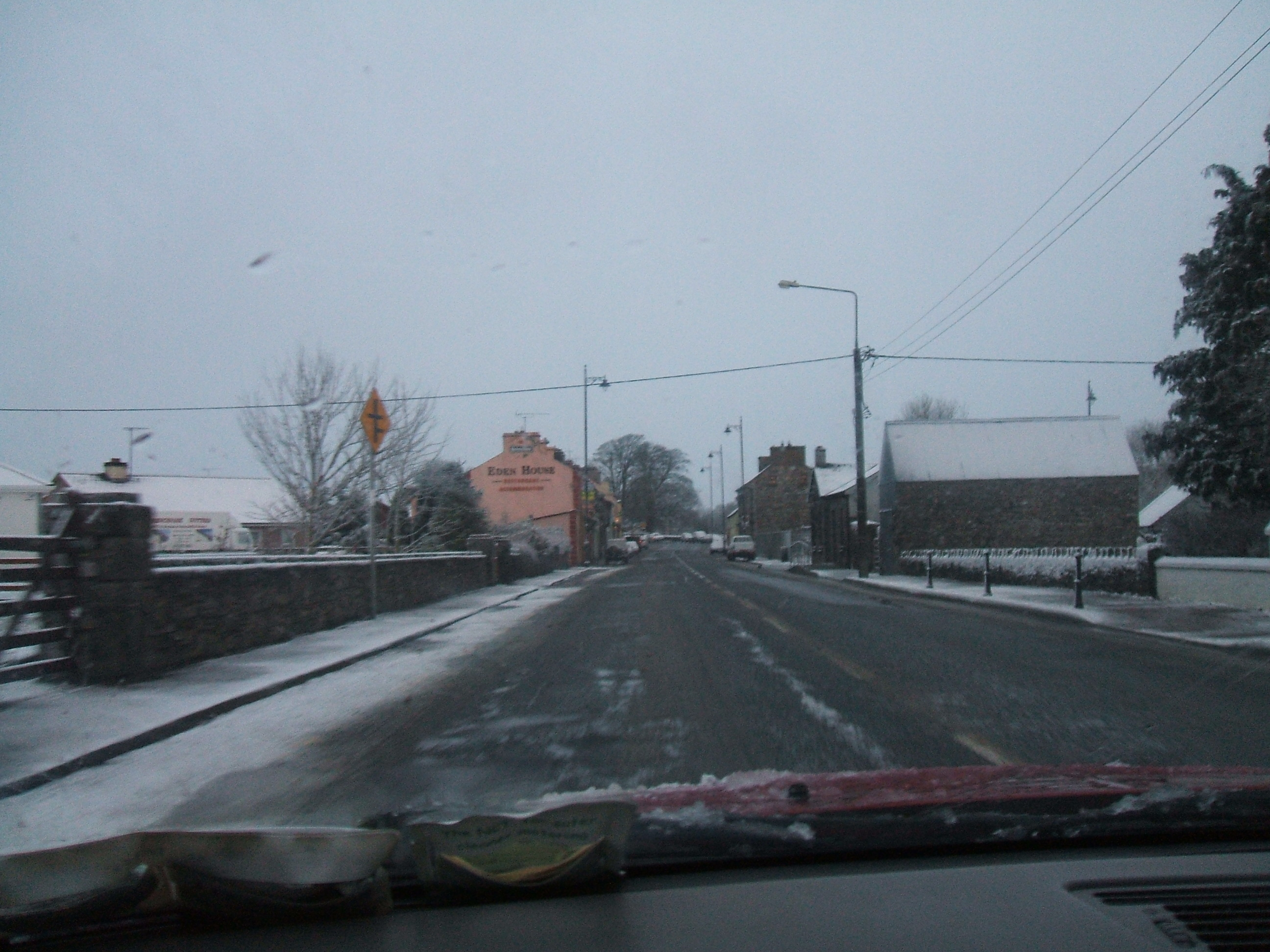
Frenchpark, present day, winter

He attended the local school in Roscommon, matriculated from Trinity College Dublin in 1708, took his degree of Bachelor of Arts in 1715 and was made Doctor of Law in 1730. He entered the Middle Temple in 1710 and was called to the Irish Bar in 1717. He sat in the Irish House of Commons as member for Jamestown, County Leitrim from 1727 to 1745.

In 1745 his uncle Mr Justice Gore announced that he would retire on health grounds from the Court of Common Pleas (Ireland) on condition that French replace him. This put the Government in an awkward position; Gore, although he was not considered an especially good judge was personally very popular, whereas French was both a notoriously bad lawyer and personally a most unpopular individual. However, since Gore, who suffered greatly from asthma, was clearly unable to continue with his duties, the Crown reluctantly agreed to appoint French. French's conduct as a judge fully justified the official misgivings: an anonymous satire refers to "snarling, bridling, self-corroding French" and asked where his like for ignorance could be found.

He retired in 1761 and died in 1772. His marriages to Frances, daughter of Sir Richard Hull of Leamcon, County Cork, and to his second wife, Frances Pooley, were childless. He was buried in St. Michan's Church, Dublin.
