= John Gore, 1st Baron Annaly =

Irish peer and politician (1718–1784)

John Gore, 1st Baron Annaly PC (Ire) (2 March 1718 – 3 April 1784) was an Irish politician and peer.

== Biography ==
He was the second son of George Gore, judge of the Court of Common Pleas (Ireland). George was in turn the son of Sir Arthur Gore, 1st Baronet. Annaly's mother was Bridget Sankey, younger daughter of John Sankey and Eleanor Morgan. His mother brought his father a fortune and the manor of Tenelick in County Longford, which came to John on the death of his brother Arthur in 1758. Gore was called to the Bar by King's Inns and worked as barrister-at-law. He was Counsel to the Commissioners of Revenue and also a King's Counsel from 1749. From 1747 and 1760, he sat as Member of Parliament (MP) for Jamestown. Subsequently, he sat for County Longford in the Irish House of Commons until 1765.

In 1760 Gore was appointed Solicitor-General for Ireland, a post he held until 1764, when he became Lord Chief Justice of the King's Bench for Ireland. In the same year he was sworn of the Privy Council of Ireland. On 17 January 1766, Gore was elevated to the Peerage of Ireland as Baron Annaly, of Tenelick in the County of Longford. In the following year he was elected Speaker of the Irish House of Lords.

He was a popular, witty and unassuming man, and a keen sportsman. In politics he was considered a strong reactionary, arguing that the Crown had the right to keep Parliament sitting indefinitely, and he was opposed to any extension of the powers of the Irish Parliament; in his later years he was inclined to denounce the Irish people as "idle and licentious". Ball notes however that Henry Grattan liked and admired Gore despite their strongly opposed political views. His judicial qualities were viciously attacked in an anonymous satire: "Without judgement, a judge makes justice unjust". Ball on the other hand argues that his judgements and speeches in the House of Commons show that he did not lack ability.

In 1747, Gore married Frances Wingfield, second daughter of Richard Wingfield, 1st Viscount Powerscourt. Their marriage was childless. Gore died, aged 66 at St Stephen's Green in Dublin and was buried in the family vault in the church of Tashinny in County Longford. With his death the barony became extinct, but was revived for his brother Henry, first and last Baron Annaly of the second creation. Lady Annaly died in 1794, and is buried at St Marylebone Parish Church, London.

Parliament of Ireland
Preceded by Richard Liddell; Gilbert King	Member of Parliament for Jamestown; 1747–1761; With: Gilbert King	Succeeded by Roger Palmer; Edward Loftus
Preceded by Henry Gore; Sir Thomas Newcomen, 8th Bt	Member of Parliament for County Longford; 1761–1765; With: Robert Harman	Succeeded by Ralph Fetherston; Edward Pakenham
Legal offices
Preceded by Philip Tisdall	Solicitor-General for Ireland; 1760–1764	Succeeded by Marcus Paterson
Preceded by Warden Flood	Lord Chief Justice of the King's Bench for Ireland; 1764–1784	Succeeded by John Scott
Peerage of Ireland
New creation	Baron Annaly; 1766–1784	Extinct
