= Charlotte Gleadowe-Newcomen, 1st Viscountess Newcomen =

Anglo-Irish peeress

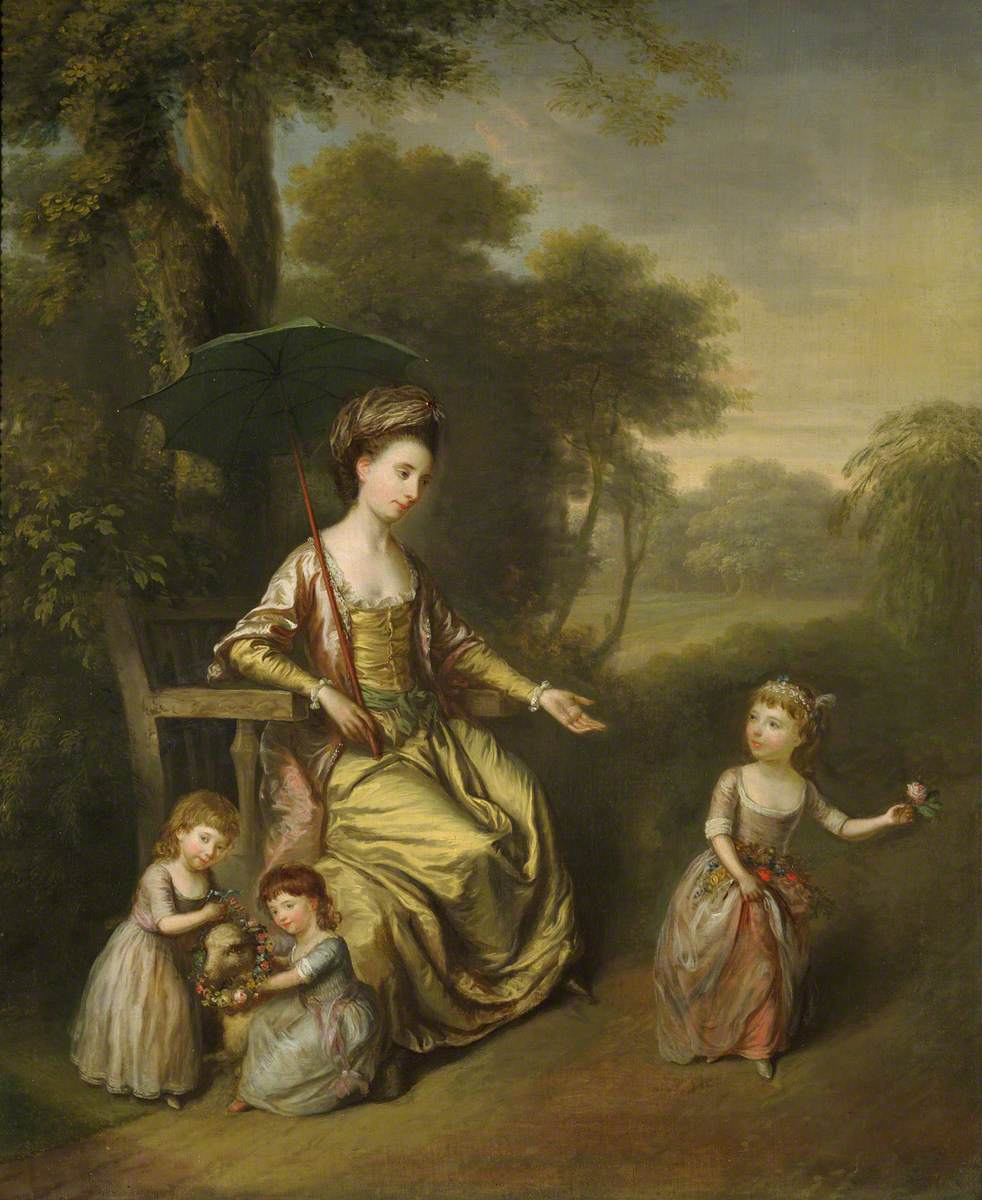
Charlotte Newcomen, Lady Gleadowe-Newcomen, 1st Viscountess Newcomen, with her Daughters Jane, Teresa and Charlotte in a Garden

Charlotte Gleadowe-Newcomen, 1st Viscountess Newcomen (died 16 May 1817), née Newcomen, was an Anglo-Irish peeress.

She was the only child and heiress of Edward Newcomen, a landowner and grandson of Sir Robert Newcomen, 6th Baronet. On 17 October 1772 she married William Gleadowe, who was later a Member of Parliament and was made a baronet in 1781. On 29 July 1800 Charlotte was created Baroness Newcomen in the Peerage of Ireland in her own right; the title was created in honour of her husband, but in such a way that would enable him to sit in the House of Commons. The family was further honoured when Charlotte was created Viscountess Newcomen on 25 January 1803. The remainder of both titles was to the male heirs of her husband, and upon Charlotte's death she was succeeded by their eldest son, Thomas Gleadowe-Newcomen, who had already inherited his father's baronetcy.

Peerage of Ireland
New creation	Viscountess Newcomen; 1803–1817	Succeeded by Thomas Gleadowe-Newcomen
New creation	Baroness Newcomen; 1800–1817	Succeeded by Thomas Gleadowe-Newcomen
