= Sir Thomas Newcomen, 8th Baronet =

Anglo-Irish politician

Sir Thomas Newcomen, 8th Baronet (1740 – 27 April 1789) was an Anglo-Irish politician.

He was the son of Sir Arthur Newcomen, 7th Baronet and succeeded to his baronetcy upon his father's death on 25 November 1759. He sat in the Irish House of Commons as the Member of Parliament for County Longford from 1759 and 1760. He then represented Longford Borough between 1761 and 1768. His title became extinct upon his death.

Parliament of Ireland
Preceded by Sir Arthur Newcomen, Bt; Henry Gore	Member of Parliament for County Longford; 1759–1760; With: Henry Gore	Succeeded by Robert Harman; John Gore
Preceded by Roger Hall; Richard Edgeworth	Member of Parliament for Longford Borough; 1761–1768; With: Joseph Henry	Succeeded by Henry Flood; David La Touche
Baronetage of Ireland
Preceded by Arthur Newcomen	Baronet (of Kenagh); 1759–1789	Extinct
