= Jamestown (Parliament of Ireland constituency) =

Pre-1801 Irish constituency

- Former borough constituency for the Irish House of Commons
- County: County Leitrim
- Borough: Jamestown

1622–1801
- Replaced by: Disfranchised

Jamestown was a constituency represented in the Irish House of Commons until 1800. It took its name from Jamestown, County Leitrim.

== History ==
In the Patriot Parliament of 1689 summoned by James II, Jamestown was represented with two members.

Jamestown was a small village containing approximately 48 houses.

== Members of Parliament, 1622–1801 ==
- 1634–1635 Charles Coote jnr and Sir William Anderson
- 1639–1649 Sir John Giffard and Sir Francis Hamilton
- 1661–1666 Sir Robert Meredith and Sir William Dixon

=== 1689–1801 ===
| Election | First MP | Second MP | |
|---|---|---|---|
| 1689 | Alexander Mac Donnell | William Shanley | |
| 1692 | John Mahon | Robert Smith | |
| 1695 | John Mahon | Edmond Reynell | |
| 1703 | John Mahon | John King | |
| 1709 | Gilbert King | John King | |
| 1715 | Gilbert King | Hon. Algernon Coote | |
| 1721 | Richard Geering | John King | |
| 1727 | Robert French | John King | |
| 1737 | Robert French | Gilbert King | |
| 1745 | Richard Liddell | Gilbert King | |
| 1747 | John Gore | Gilbert King | |
| 1761 | Roger Palmer | Edward Loftus | |
| 1768 | James Browne | John FitzGibbon | |
| 1776 | Viscount Westport | Richard Martin | Patriot |
| 1781 | John Hall | Richard Martin | Patriot |
| 1783 | Sir Francis Hutchinson | Henry Bruen | |
| 1790 | Arthur Wolfe | Henry Wood | |
| 1796 | Arthur Wolfe | Robert Edward King (Note: Styled as The Honourable from 1797) | |
| 1798 | Gilbert King | John King | |
| 1801 | Disenfranchised | | |

== Bibliography ==
- O'Hart, John (2007). The Irish and Anglo-Irish Landed Gentry: When Cromwell came to Ireland. Vol. II. Heritage Books. ISBN 978-0-7884-1927-0.
- Leigh Rayment's historical List of Members of the Irish House of Commons. Cites: Johnston-Liik, Edith Mary (2002). The History of the Irish Parliament 1692-1800 (6 volumes). Ulster Historical Foundation.
