= George Gore (judge) =

Irish landowner and judge

George Gore (1675–1753) was an Irish landowner and judge: he held office as Attorney General for Ireland and later served as a justice of the Court of Common Pleas (Ireland). Despite his vigorous efforts, he failed to gain further promotion, but his second son John, Lord Annaly, became Lord Chief Justice of Ireland.

== Life ==
He was the second son of Sir Arthur Gore, 1st Baronet of Newtown, County Mayo and his wife Eleanor, daughter of Sir George St George, knight, of Carrickdrumrusk, County Leitrim, and Katherine Gifford. He was educated at Shrewsbury School and Trinity College Dublin, where he matriculated in 1691 and received a degree of Doctor of Laws in 1709. He entered Middle Temple in 1698 and was called to the Irish Bar in 1700.

He sat in the Irish House of Commons as member for Longford Borough and was made Attorney General in 1714. He accepted a place on the Court of Common Pleas in 1720, apparently due to an asthmatic complaint, which made his previous office too onerous (his son Arthur was plagued all his life by asthma, and died of it). Almost at once, he began to lobby for the Chief Justiceship of whichever court first became available. He had the support of William King, the influential Archbishop of Dublin who, on the return to England of Sir Jeffrey Gilbert, Chief Baron of the Irish Exchequer in 1722, wrote to the Government pointing out that death, retirement, illness and overwork had reduced the Irish judiciary to "a pitiful condition" and arguing that Gore would fill the office of Chief Baron well. In the event he was passed over in favour of Sir Bernard Hale, nor despite his best efforts was he ever promoted to the rank of Chief Justice.

Elrington Ball believed that the reason for his failure to achieve promotion was quite simply his lack of legal ability: he was much loved by his friends, but none of them ever praised his judicial qualities. In the 1740s his health, which had never been good, failed, and he retired in 1745. The retirement itself was a matter of controversy since Gore insisted on being replaced by his nephew Robert French, the son of his sister Anne Gore French; the Government was most unwilling to make this appointment since French was a poor lawyer and extremely unpopular, but it reluctantly agreed.

Gore married Bridget Sankey, daughter and co-heiress of John Sankey of Tenelick, County Longford and his wife Eleanor Morgan of County Sligo, and acquired great wealth through his marriage. They had eight children, including the following three sons and one daughter:

- Arthur (died 1758)
- John Gore, 1st Baron Annaly, Lord Chief Justice of Ireland
- Henry Gore, 1st Baron Annaly (of the second creation)
- Bridget (died 1762), wife of Rev. Cutts Harman, Dean of Waterford.

Gore was buried in the family vault in the church of Tashinny, County Longford. The interior of the church is dominated by the huge white and grey marble 'Annally Monument', the lengthy Latin inscription on which has been translated as: follows

"Sacred to the memory of George Gore and Bridget, his wife. She was an heiress to Henry Sankey of Tennelick who, having acted with energy on the side of the King when civil war had raged, obtained the lands which you see lying around as the reward of his military valour. Being in no less favour with the people than with the prince, supported by the suffrages of this very body, he was elected in the first parliament which Charles II appointed. When Bridget had given birth to eight children, she left behind a mournful loss, 13 September 1727, aged 39 years."

"This George, the youngest son of Arthur Gore of Newtowngore, Baronet, was on account of his services to his country – lately in peril – appointed Attorney General by George, then happily entering upon his reign. His health being unequal to the discharge of this office, he was advanced to the Court of Common Pleas, and for 25 years performed the part of a most prudent and incorrupt judge, at length having retired A.D. 1745. His entire old age was spent in cultivating and adorning these lands he obtained as a dowry, always his delight. Borne down by years, he departed this life A.D. 1753 in the 79th year of his age."

"Here lies Arthur, having survived his father a short time only, who, labouring with almost incessant asthma, died A.D. 1758. Also here lies the only surviving daughter of these same George and Bridget – Bridget Harman, wife of the Dean of the Cathedral Church of Waterford, a woman adorned with some superior accomplishments during her life. She was most learned and deservedly most dear to her friends. Early, though not unprepared, removed by death 22 November 1762, scarcely 39 years of age, she departed never sufficiently to be lamented."

Parliament of Ireland
Preceded by Sir Richard Levinge, 1st Bt; Francis Edgeworth	Member of Parliament for Longford Borough; 1709–1721; With: Sir Richard Levinge, 1st Bt to 1713; James Macartney from 1713	Succeeded by James Macartney; John Folliot
Legal offices
Preceded by Sir Richard Levinge	Attorney-General for Ireland; 1714-1720	Succeeded by John Rogerson
