= William Wolseley (English Army officer) =

English army officer

William Wolseley PC
- Born: c. 1640
- Died: 1697
- Military career
- Allegiance: Kingdom of England
- Branch: English Army
- Rank: Brigadier-general
- Conflicts: Williamite War in Ireland

Brigadier-general William Wolseley, PC (c. 1640 – 1697) was an English army officer who fought in the Williamite War in Ireland.

== Life ==
=== Early life ===
William Wolseley was fifth son of Sir Robert Wolseley, 1st Baronet, of Wolseley, Staffordshire, and younger brother of Sir Charles Wolseley (c. 1630–1714).

=== Military career ===
In June 1667 William was appointed captain-lieutenant to the Marquis of Worcester's newly raised foot regiment. This corps was disbanded a few months later when the Treaty of Breda was signed. Lord Worcester raised a foot regiment (disbanded in 1674) in January 1673 to repel an unexpected Dutch invasion, and Wolseley was appointed his captain-lieutenant by commission dated 26 January 1673. On 1 April 1679 Wolseley was appointed captain-lieutenant to an independent foot company at Chepstow Castle, commanded by the Marquis of Worcester (afterwards Duke of Beaufort), and six years later he was appointed captain in Beaufort's foot regiment (11th foot) by commission dated 20 June 1685. On 12 August 1688, when quartered at Scarborough, Wolseley came into prominent notice by causing the mayor of Scarborough, one Aislaby, to be publicly tossed in a blanket by a file of musqueteers for indignities inflicted on a Protestant clergyman when performing divine service in church. The mayor laid his grievances before James II in person, and Wolseley was summoned to appear before the council in London. "The captain pleaded his majesty's gracious general pardon, which was in the press, so was dismissed". (Note: Ellis Correspondence, ii. 225–6.) On 3 December 1688 Lord Montgomery, the colonel of Wolseley's regiment, and Lord Langdale of the same corps, both Roman Catholics, were seized in their beds at Hull by Captain Copley and the Protestant officers of the garrison and kept in confinement. Wolseley now determined to join the Prince of Orange, but his doing so was delayed by false rumours of massacres in various parts of the country. (Note: Lionel Copley to Captain Wolseley at York, 16 December 1688.)

Wolseley's force of character and Protestant zeal were rewarded by the Prince of Orange, who conferred on him the lieutenant-colonelcy of Sir John Hanmer's regiment (11th foot). In May 1689 Hanmer's regiment accompanied General Percy Kirke to Ireland to assist in relieving Derry. Wolseley's name appears as one of the council of war held by Kirke on his arrival in Lough Derry. (Note: Hist. MSS. Comm. 11th Rep. vi. 185.) A deputation having waited on Kirke in June 1689 from Enniskillen, praying him to send some experienced officers to command the newly raised levies in County Fermanagh, Kirke sent Wolseley, with a few other officers, to organise and lead these irregulars. At the same time Kirke, by virtue of the authority he had from William III, issued commissions to the Enniskillen officers, which at a later date were confirmed by the King. Wolseley was now appointed colonel of the "Inniskilling Horse", which then consisted of twenty-five troops, but in January 1690 was reduced to twelve troops. (Note: Harl. MS. 7439.) For twelve months prior to the Boyne, Wolseley, as commander of the Enniskillen troops, was engaged in almost constant raids against the Irish forces of King James. He harassed the Irish army before Derry, and inflicted heavy loss upon them when they raised the siege and retreated. In the subsequent sanguinary action at Newtown-Butler Wolseley, with only two thousand men, defeated General Justin McCarthy, who commanded an army of three times that number, and showed such good generalship that between two thousand and three thousand Irish were killed or drowned in Lough Erne, many officers taken prisoner, and a large store of arms and ammunition captured. Wolseley surprised and took Belturbet in December 1689, and on 12 February 1690 defeated the Duke of Berwick in an engagement before Cavan and captured that town, which he burnt. A few weeks later he was severely wounded when commanding in the field. (Note: "Letter from a late Captain in Lord Castleton's Regiment", dated from Lisburn, 26 May 1690, printed in Somers Tracts, ed. Scott, xi. 398.)

Wolseley commanded eight troops of his regiment at the Battle of the Boyne (1 July 1690). But by an unfortunate mistake in giving the word of command the men formed to the left instead of to the right, thus bringing them with their backs to the enemy. Some of the other officers shouted to the men to wheel to the right, thereby causing some confusion. General Richard Hamilton took advantage of the disorder and charged. Some fifty of Wolseley's men were cut down, and the others, being pressed by the Irish cavalry, were routed. Their retreat was checked by the timely advance of the King with some Dutch cavalry. William rallied the fugitives, who again faced the enemy, this time with better success.

He rendered valuable service during the remainder of the Irish campaign, and was present with his regiment at the dearly bought victory of Aughrim (12 July 1691).

Wolseley's services were rewarded in August 1692 by his being appointed Master-General of the Ordnance in Ireland, in room of Lord Mountjoy. On 22 March 1693 Wolseley was made brigadier-general over all the horse, and in May 1696 was appointed one of the Lords Justices in Ireland and a Privy Councillor.

=== Death ===
He died, unmarried, in December 1697.

== Bibliography ==
- Dalton, Charles (1900). "Wolseley, William (1640?-1691)" . In Lee, Sidney (ed.). Dictionary of National Biography. Vol. 62. London: Smith, Elder & Co. pp. 323–324.
- Dalton, Charles; Murtagh, Herman (2004). "Wolseley, William (c. 1640–1697)". In Oxford Dictionary of National Biography. Oxford: Oxford University Press. n.p.
