= Sir William Gleadowe-Newcomen, 1st Baronet =

Anglo-Irish politician (1741–1807)

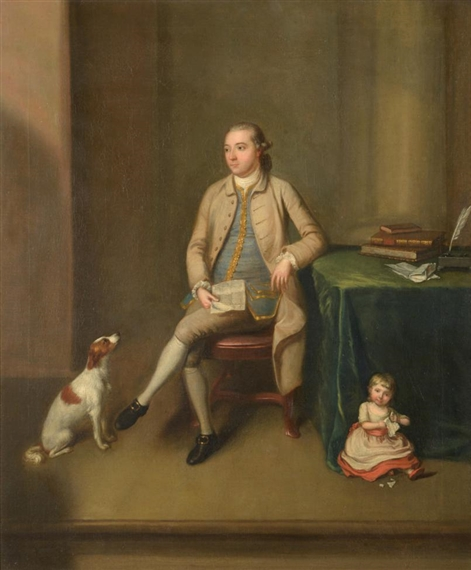
Sir William Gleadowe-Newcomen, 1st Baronet

Sir William Gleadowe-Newcomen, 1st Baronet (1741 – 21 August 1807) was an Anglo-Irish politician and banker.

== Biography ==
Born William Gleadowe, he assumed the additional surname and arms of Newcomen following his marriage to Charlotte Newcomen, only child and heiress of Edward Newcomen, on 17 October 1772. On 9 October 1781 he was created a baronet, of Carrickglass in the Baronetage of Ireland.

Gleadowe-Newcomen was elected Company Secretary of the Royal Canal Company at its first meeting on Dawson Street on 13 November 1789. His involvement in the enterprise is recalled in the naming of Newcomen Bridge which spans the Royal Canal at North Strand and was completed in 1793.

The coat of arms of Sir William Gleadowe-Newcomen, Bt.

He followed in his father's footsteps as a banker, running a private bank commonly known as Newcomen's Bank. The former bank building is considered to be one of Dublin's finest eighteenth century buildings. It was designed by Thomas Ivory in 1781.

Between 1790 and 1800 Gleadowe-Newcomen was the Member of Parliament for County Longford in the Irish House of Commons. Following the Acts of Union 1800, he represented County Longford in the House of Commons of the United Kingdom between 1801 and 1802.

On 29 July 1800 Gleadowe-Newcomen's wife was created Baroness Newcomen in the Peerage of Ireland in honour of her husband, with the remainder to his male heirs. Upon Gleadowe-Newcomen's death in 1807 he was succeeded by his son, Thomas Gleadowe-Newcomen. He also had three daughters, the eldest of whom, Teresa, married Sir Charles Turner of Kirkleatham. William Gleadowe-Newcomen is interred in a family tomb at Drumcondra Churchyard, as is his son Thomas.

Newcomen lived at Killester House which was upgraded and extended by Bryan Bolger around 1794. He is recorded as dying from a long and painful illness at Killester House in 1807.

Parliament of Ireland
Preceded by Henry Gore; Laurence Harman Harman	Member of Parliament for County Longford; 1790–1800; With: Laurence Harman Harman (1790–1793); Caleb Barnes Harman (1793–1796); Sir Thomas Fetherston, Bt (1796–1800)	Parliament of Ireland abolished
Parliament of the United Kingdom
New constituency	Member of Parliament for County Longford; 1801–1802; With: Sir Thomas Fetherston, Bt	Succeeded by Hon. Thomas Gleadowe-Newcomen; Sir Thomas Fetherston, Bt
Baronetage of Ireland
New creation	Baronet (of Carrickglass); 1781–1807	Succeeded by Thomas Gleadowe-Newcomen
