= County Longford (Parliament of Ireland constituency) =

Pre-1801 Irish constituency

- Former county constituency for the Irish House of Commons
- County: County Longford

1585–1801
- Seats: 2
- Replaced by: County Longford

County Longford was a constituency represented in the Irish House of Commons from 1585 to 1800 representing County Longford. Between 1725 and 1793, under the Penal Laws, Catholics and those married to Catholics could not vote.

== Members of Parliament ==
=== 1585–1666 ===
Election	First member	Second member
1585	Faghny O'Ferrall	William O'Ferrall
1613	Connell O'Ferrall	John O'Ferrall
1634	Roger Ferrall	Faghny Ferrall
1639	Sir James Dillon (ennobled, replaced 1646 by Sir Francis Edgeworth)	Faghny McRosse Ferrall (died, replaced 1646 by Sir Robert Newcomen)
1661	Henry Sankey	Adam Molyneux

=== 1689 (Patriot Parliament) ===
Election	First member	Second member
1689	Roger Farrell	Robert Farrell

=== 1692–1801 ===
Election	First MP	Second MP
1692	Robert Choppin	Sir Robert Newcomen, 6th Bt
1695	Wentworth Harman	Sir Robert Newcomen, 6th Bt
1703	Anthony Sheppard	Sir Robert Newcomen, 6th Bt
1713	Henry Edgeworth	Sir Robert Newcomen, 6th Bt
1715	Anthony Sheppard	Sir Robert Newcomen, 6th Bt
1735	Anthony Sheppard	Sir Arthur Newcomen, 7th Bt
1739	Arthur Gore	Sir Arthur Newcomen, 7th Bt
1758	Henry Gore	Sir Arthur Newcomen, 7th Bt
1759	Henry Gore	Sir Thomas Newcomen, 8th Bt
1761	Robert Harman	John Gore
1765	Ralph Fetherston	Hon. Edward Pakenham
1766	Ralph Fetherston	Wentworth Parsons
1768	Henry Gore	Hon. Robert Pakenham
1775	Henry Gore	Laurence Harman Harman
1790	Sir William Gleadowe-Newcomen, 1st Bt	Laurence Harman Harman
1793	Sir William Gleadowe-Newcomen, 1st Bt	Caleb Barnes Harman
1796	Sir William Gleadowe-Newcomen, 1st Bt	Sir Thomas Fetherston, 2nd Bt
1801	Replaced by Westminster constituency County Longford	
