= List of Escheators of Munster =

This is a list of the Members of Parliament appointed as Escheator of Munster, a notional 'office of profit under the crown' which was used to resign from the Irish House of Commons, and after the Union, that of the United Kingdom.

The escheator was originally responsible for the administration of escheat /ɪsˈtʃiːt/, a common law doctrine that transfers the real property of a person who has died without heirs to the crown or state.

The office was formerly substantive. It was founded in 1605, when the escheatorship for Ireland was divided among the provinces of Connaught, Leinster, Munster, and Ulster.

== Substantive holders ==
- 1746: William Austen

== Members of the Irish House of Commons ==
- 1794: Marcus Beresford (St Canice)
- 1794: Thomas Taylour, Viscount Headfort (Longford)
- 1794: Hon. John Knox (Dungannon)
- 1795: Richard Boyle Townsend (Dingle)
- 1795: George FitzGerald Hill (Coleraine)
- 1795: John Richardson (Newtown Limavady)
- 1795: Arthur O'Connor (Philipstown)
- 1795: Sackville Hamilton (Clogher)
- February 1795: Hon. Clotworthy Taylor (Trim)
- 1795: Hon. Henry Wellesley (Trim)
- 1796: George Jackson (Coleraine)
- November 1796: Hon. Francis James Mathew (Callan)
- c.1797: Sir James Bond, 1st Baronet (Naas)
- 1798: William Fulk Greville (Granard)
- 1798: Gorges Lowther (Ratoath)
- 1798: George Ponsonby (Lismore)
- 1798: John Lloyd (Inistioge)
- January 1798: Thomas Pakenham Vandeleur (Granard)
- 1799: Eyre Power Trench (Newtown Limavady)
- 1799: Thomas Kavanagh (Kilkenny City)
- 1799: Hon. Joseph Lysaght (Cashel)
- 1799: Henry Alcock (Fethard)
- 1799: William Domville Stanley Monck (Gorey)
- 1799: Henry Osborne (Carysfort)
- 1799: Ephraim Carroll (Bannow)
- 1800: Charles Boyle (Charleville)
- 1800: Hans Blackwood (Killyleagh)
- 1800: John Francis Cradock (Midleton)
- 1800: Theophilus Blakeney (Athenry)
- 1800: John Bingham (Tuam)
- 1800: Robert Crowe (Philipstown)
- 1800: George Fulke Lyttelton (Granard)
- 1800: Nathaniel Sneyd (Carrick)
- 1800: Charles Silver Oliver (Kilmallock)
- 1800: Thomas Conolly (County Londonderry)
- 1800: Henry Coddington (Dunleer)
- 1800: Thomas Worth Newenham (Clonmel)
- 1800: Montague James Mathew (Ballynakill)
- 1800: Eyre Coote (Maryborough)
- 1800: Sir John Tydd, 1st Baronet (Fore)
- 1800: Sir Francis Hopkins, 1st Baronet (Kilbeggan)
- 1800: Hon. Richard Annesley (Blessington)
- January 1800: William Moore (St Johnstown)
- January 1800: Hon. Robert King (Boyle)
- January 1800: Jonah Barrington (Clogher)
- February 1800: George Crookshank (Belfast)
- February 1800: Lorenzo Moore (Ardfert)
- February 1800: Robert Shaw (Bannow)
- March 1800: Sir Hercules Langrishe, 1st Baronet (Knocktopher)
- April 1800: James Kearney (Thomastown)
- June 1800: Edward Hoare (Banagher)
- July 1800: Thomas Whaley (Enniscorthy)
- August 1800: Richard Fortescue Sharkey (Dungannon)

== Members of the United Kingdom House of Commons ==
- February 1801: Francis Leigh (Wexford)
- February 1801: St George Daly (Galway Borough)
- July 1801: Francis Aldborough Prittie (Carlow)
- December 1802: Henry Parnell (Portarlington)
- August 1803: William Handcock (Athlone)
- June 1805: Denis Bowes Daly (Galway Borough)
- July 1806: Owen Wynne (Sligo)
- January 1807: John Metge (Dundalk)
- February 1808: James Fitzgerald (Ennis)
- February 1808: William Smyth (County Westmeath)
- July 1808: Francis Nathaniel Burton (County Clare)
- April 1809: Quinton Dick (Cashel)
- March 1811: James Daly (Galway Borough)
- June 1811: John Claudius Beresford (County Waterford)
- May 1812: Francis Savage (Down)
- December 1812: John Metge (Dundalk)
- December 1812: James Fitzgerald (Ennis)
- May 1814: Overington Blunden (Kilkenny City)
- July 1814: John Fish (Wexford)
- March 1815: Joshua Spencer (Sligo)
- July 1815: George Abercromby (Clackmannanshire)
- May 1820: John McClintock (Athlone)
- June 1820: Sir Ross Mahon, Bt. (Ennis)
- June 1820: John Metge (Dundalk)
- December 1830: John Doherty (Newport)

After the Acts of Union 1800, the office was retained as a sinecure, without duties, and was also used for resignation from Parliamentary seats. John Hewson was appointed to the post by letters patent in 1825, 1830, 1837, and 1838. In the latter year, however, all of the Irish escheatorships were abolished by the Lord Lieutenant of Ireland.

== See also ==
- Escheator
- Resignation from the British House of Commons
