= William Arabin =

William Arabin may refer to:

- William St Julien Arabin (1773–1841), British lawyer and judge
- William John Arabin (1750–1827), his father, British Army commander
