= Francis Hopkins =

Francis or Frank Hopkins may refer to:

- Francis A. Hopkins (1853–1918), U.S. representative from Kentucky
- Sir Francis Hopkins, 1st Baronet (1756–1814), Anglo-Irish politician
- F. R. C. Hopkins (Francis Rawdon Chesney Hopkins, 1849–1916), Australian playwright
- Sir Francis Hopkins, 2nd Baronet (1813–1860) of the Hopkins baronets
- Frances Anne Hopkins (1838–1919), English painter
- Frank Hopkins (1865–1951), American professional horseman
- Frank Hopkins (Royal Navy officer) (1910–1990), officer in the Royal Navy
- Frank Hopkins (cricketer) (1875–1930), English cricketer
- Frank Hopkins (footballer) (1909–1960), Australian rules footballer
- Frank E. Hopkins (1863–1933), American church music composer, book printer, and politician from New York
