= Thomas Pelham, 2nd Earl of Chichester =

18th/19th-century British politician

The Right Honourable The Earl of Chichester PC PC (Ire) FRS
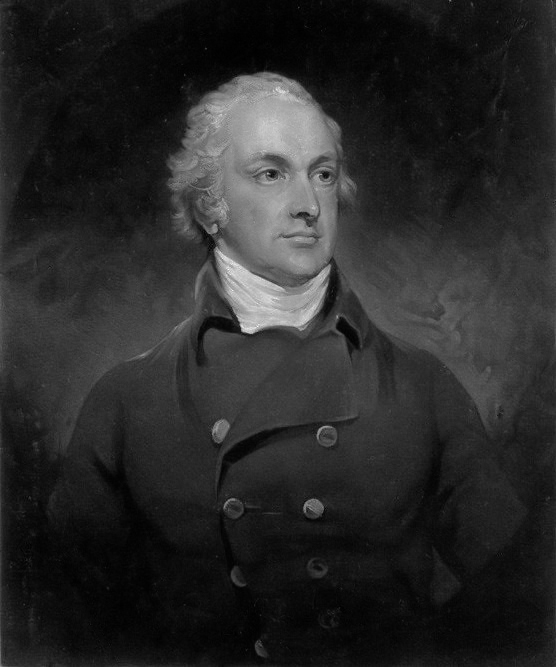

Home Secretary
- In office 30 July 1801 – 17 August 1803
- Monarch: George III
- Prime Minister: Henry Addington
- Preceded by: The Duke of Portland
- Succeeded by: Charles Philip Yorke

Personal details
- Born: 28 April 1756 London, England
- Died: 4 July 1826 (aged 70) London, England
- Party: Whig, later Tory
- Spouse(s): Lady Mary Osborne (1776–1862)
- Children: 10, including Henry, Frederick, and John
- Education: Clare College, Cambridge

Thomas Pelham, 2nd Earl of Chichester, PC, PC (Ire), FRS (28 April 1756 – 4 July 1826), styled The Honourable Thomas Pelham from 1768 until 1783, The Right Honourable Thomas Pelham from 1783 to 1801, and then known as Lord Pelham until 1805, was a British Whig politician. He notably held office as Home Secretary under Henry Addington from 1801 to 1803.

== Background and education ==
Chichester was the eldest son of Thomas Pelham, 1st Earl of Chichester, and his wife Anne, daughter of Frederick Meinhardt Frankland. The Right Reverend George Pelham was his younger brother. He was educated at Westminster and Clare College, Cambridge.

== Political career ==
Pelham was commissioned as a captain in the Sussex Militia when it was raised by the Duke of Richmond in June 1778, and was subsequently promoted to major and lieutenant-colonel, frequently deputising in command for Richmond. During the summer of 1780 the regiment was at Ranmore Camp near Dorking in Surrey, close enough to Sussex for Pelham to stand as a candidate for the county in the general election and to be elected.

Chichester was appointed Surveyor-General of the Ordnance under the Duke of Richmond as Master-General of the Ordnance in Lord Rockingham's second ministry (1782), and Chief Secretary for Ireland in the coalition ministry of 1783 (when he was also appointed to the Privy Council of Ireland). He represented Carrick in the Irish House of Commons from 1783 to 1790 and Clogher from 1795 to 1797. In 1795 he was sworn of the Privy Council and became Irish chief secretary under Pitt's government, retiring in 1798.

In the latter year he sat briefly for Naas before transferring to Armagh Borough, a seat he held only until the next year. He was Home Secretary from July 1801 to August 1803 under Addington, who made him Chancellor of the Duchy of Lancaster in 1803. Pelham went out of office in 1804, and in the next year succeeded to the earldom. He was joint-Postmaster General from 1807 to 1823, and for the remaining three years of his life Postmaster General.

== Family ==
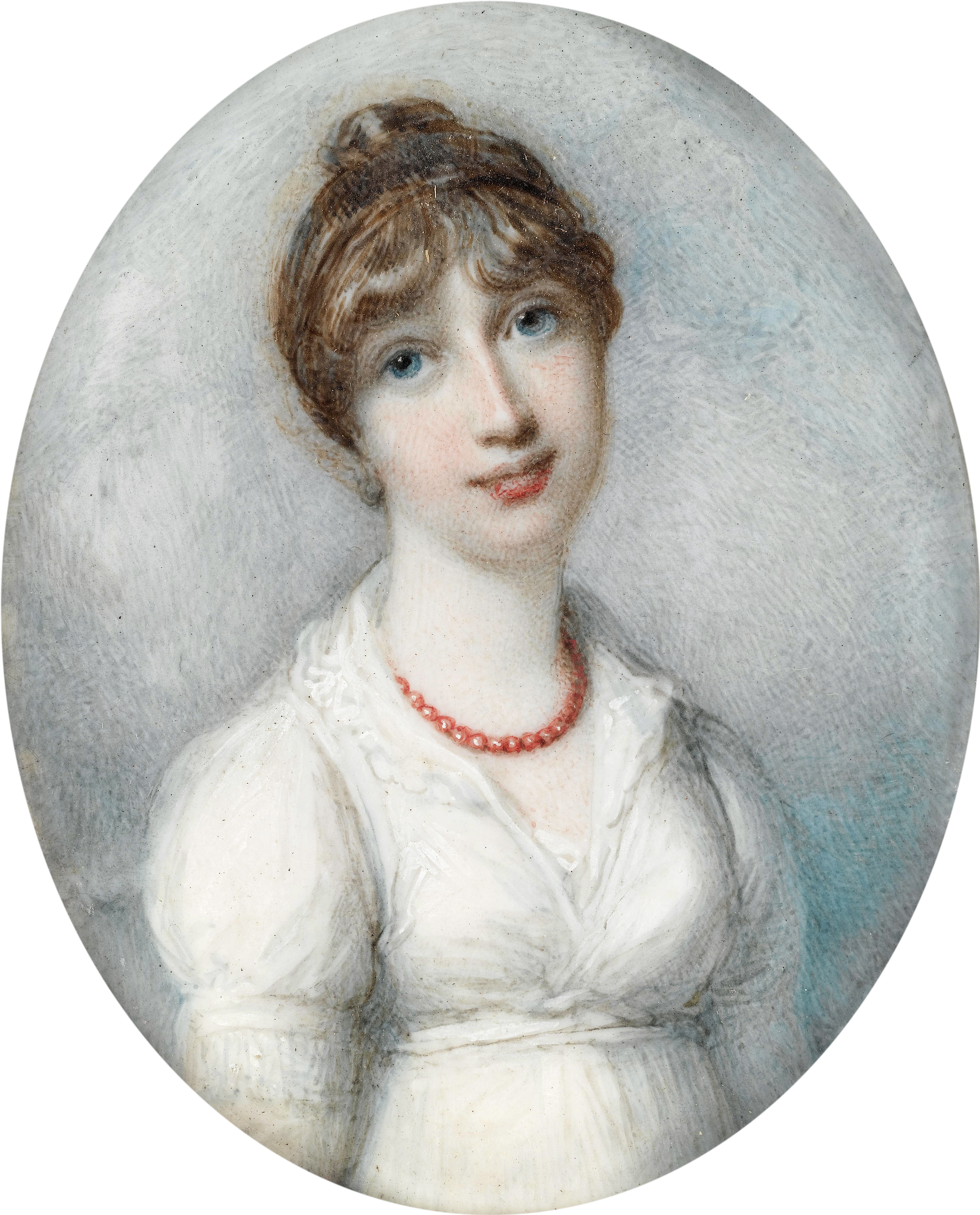
Mary Henrietta Juliana Pelham née Osborne (Richard Cosway)

Lord Chichester married Lady Mary Henrietta Juliana, daughter of Francis Osborne, 5th Duke of Leeds, in 1801. They had four sons and six daughters. Their second son, the Hon. Frederick Thomas Pelham, was a naval commander, while their third son, the Right Reverend John Thomas Pelham, was Bishop of Norwich. Lord Chichester died in July 1826, aged 70, and was succeeded in his titles by his eldest son, Henry. His daughter Lady Amelia Rose married Major General Sir Joshua Jebb, the Surveyor General of Prisons and designer of Pentonville Prison, the 'Model Prison', on 5 September 1854. The Countess of Chichester died in October 1862, aged 86. His daughter, Lady Lucy Anne Pelham, married Sir David Dundas.

== Coat of arms ==
Coat of arms of Thomas Pelham, 2nd Earl of Chichester
Coronet A coronet of an Earl Crest A peacock in pride argent. Escutcheon Quarterly: 1st and 4th azure, three pelicans vulning themselves argent; 2nd and 3rd gules, two pieces of belts with buckles, erect in pale, the buckles upwards argent. Supporters Dexter, a horse of a mouse dun colour; Sinister, a bear proper, each collared with a belt, buckle and pendant or. Motto Vincit amor patriae (The love of my country will prevail). Badge The buckle of a belt or.

Parliament of Great Britain
Preceded by Lord George Henry Lennox; Sir Thomas Spencer Wilson	Member of Parliament for Sussex; 1780–1801; With: Lord George Henry Lennox 1780–1790; Charles Lennox 1790–1801	Succeeded by Parliament of the United Kingdom
Parliament of Ireland
Preceded by Robert Tighe; Edward King	Member of Parliament for Carrick; 1783–1790; With: George Sandford 1783; Edward King 1783–1790	Succeeded by Edward King; Hon. Nathaniel Clements
Preceded by Sackville Hamilton; Richard Townsend Herbert	Member of Parliament for Clogher; 1795–1798; With: Richard Townsend Herbert	Succeeded by Sir John Tydd, 1st Bt; Thomas Burgh
Preceded by Robert Hobart; Sackville Hamilton	Member of Parliament for Armagh Borough; 1798–1799; With: Patrick Duigenan	Succeeded by Patrick Duigenan; Gerard Lake
Parliament of the United Kingdom
Preceded by Parliament of Great Britain	Member of Parliament for Sussex; 1801; With: Charles Lennox	Succeeded by Charles Lennox; John 'Mad Jack' Fuller
Military offices
Preceded by Charles Frederick	Surveyor-General of the Ordnance; 1782–1783	Succeeded by John Courtenay
Political offices
Preceded by William Windham	Chief Secretary for Ireland; 1783–1784	Succeeded by Thomas Orde
Preceded by Viscount Milton	Chief Secretary for Ireland; 1795–1798	Succeeded by Viscount Castlereagh
Preceded by The Lord Glentworth	Secretary of State, Ireland; 1796–1797	Succeeded by Viscount Castlereagh
Preceded by The Duke of Portland	Home Secretary; 1801–1803	Succeeded by Charles Philip Yorke
Preceded by The Lord Hobart	Leader of the House of Lords; 1801–1803	Succeeded by The Lord Hawkesbury
Preceded by The Earl of Liverpool	Chancellor of the Duchy of Lancaster; 1803–1804	Succeeded by The Lord Mulgrave
Preceded by The Earl of Aylesford	Captain of the Yeomen of the Guard; 1804	Succeeded by The Earl of Macclesfield
Preceded by The Earl of Carysfort; The Earl of Buckinghamshire	Postmaster General; 1807–1826; With: The Earl of Sandwich 1807–1814; The Earl of Clancarty 1814–1816; The Marquess of Salisbury 1816–1823	Succeeded by The Lord Frederick Montagu
Peerage of the United Kingdom
Preceded by Thomas Pelham	Earl of Chichester; 1805–1826	Succeeded by Henry Pelham
Peerage of Great Britain
Preceded by Thomas Pelham	Baron Pelham of Stanmer (writ in acceleration); 1801–1826	Succeeded by Henry Pelham
