= John L. Arabin =

Irish politician and businessman (1794–1863)

Lord Mayor of Dublin
- In office 1845–1846
- Preceded by: Sir Timothy O'Brien
- Succeeded by: John Keshan

Personal details
- Born: 28 December 1794 County Dublin, Ireland
- Died: 31 March 1863 (aged 68)
- Resting place: Mount Jerome Cemetery
- Party: Whig

John Ladeveze Arabin (28 December 1794 – March 1863) was Irish businessman and Whig politician and businessman. He served as Lord Mayor of Dublin from 1845 to 1846.

== Family ==
Arabin is a family name originating in Provence in the south of France, as d'Arabin or D’Arabien. Bartholomew d'Arabin fled France after the revocation of the edict of Nantes in 1685. He settled in Ireland, where his descendants remained until the mid-19th century.

John was the youngest of Henry and Ann Arabin's nine sons. His father, Henry Arabin (1752–1841), a prominent Dublin lawyer, landowner and political activist, ran the Corkagh gunpowder mills in the Clondalkin area. Henry Arabin was a close associate of Daniel O'Connell and author of pamphlets on political and economic subjects.

== Political career ==
Arabin was elected to Dublin Corporation in October 1842. He was elected lord mayor in 1844 and took office in 1845. In September 1845 he chaired a meeting of the Dublin Anti-Slavery Society at which Frederick Douglass spoke while on tour in Ireland. He was a listed magistrate, and justice of the peace for County Dublin.

He was involved in a court case in March 1846 (Mary Carroll v. John Ladavaze Arabin) at the Wicklow Assizes, where a jury ordered him to pay £1,000 in damages following a civil conviction for incestuous seduction of his own daughter Mary Anne at a location down a lane off Sackville Street.

Civic offices
| Preceded by Sir Timothy O'Brien | Lord Mayor of Dublin; 1845–1846 | Succeeded by John Keshan |
