= John Ormsby Vandeleur =

John Ormsby Vandeleur may refer to:

- Sir John Ormsby Vandeleur (1763–1849), British Army general
- John Ormsby Vandeleur (Ennis MP) (1765–1828), Irish landowner and politician, MP for Ennis and Carlow
- John Ormsby Vandeleur (MP for Granard) (1767–1822), Irish politician, MP for Granard 1790–1798
