= George William Molyneux =

Irish politician

George William Molyneux (28 October 1751 – 27 July 1806) was an Irish politician.

== Early life ==
Molyneux was born on 28 October 1751 as the second son of Sir Capel Molyneux, 3rd Baronet and the former Elizabeth East. He was a brother of Sir Capel Molyneux 4th Baronet, Anne (née Molyneux) Brabazon (wife of Sir Anthony Brabazon, 1st Baronet), and Harriet (née Molyneux) Arabin (mother of William St Julien Arabin). After his mother's death in 1757, his father married Elizabeth, a daughter of Lt. Gen. John Adlercron, formerly Commander-in-Chief, India. From that marriage, he had two younger half-brothers, Thomas (who succeeded as the 5th Baronet) and John Molyneux of the Royal Navy.

His paternal grandparents were Sir Thomas Molyneux, 1st Baronet and his second wife Catherine Howard (a daughter of Professor Ralph Howard of Trinity College). His maternal grandfather was William East of Hall Place, Berkshire, and his uncle was Sir William East, 1st Baronet.

== Career ==
Molyneux was called to the bar in 1750. From 1783 to 1790, Molyneux served as a Member of Parliament for Granard.

== Personal life ==
In 1776, Molyneux married Catherine Gore, a daughter of Richard Gore, Esq. Together, they were the parents of one daughter:

- Charlotte Molyneux, who predeceased him.

Molyneux died at his house at Sutton, near Dublin, on 27 July 1806.

Parliament of Ireland
Preceded by Thomas Maunsell; William Long Kingsman	Member of Parliament for Granard; 1783–1790; With: Robert Jephson	Succeeded by John Ormsby Vandeleur; Thomas Pakenham Vandeleur
