= Richard Townsend Herbert =

Irish politician

Richard Townsend Herbert (1755 – 18 December 1832) was an Irish politician.

Herbert served in the Irish House of Commons as the Member of Parliament for County Kerry between 1783 and 1790. He then represented Clogher from 1790 to 1797 and Granard between January and August 1800.

Parliament of Ireland
Preceded by Rowland Bateman; Arthur Blennerhassett	Member of Parliament for County Kerry; 1783–1790; With: Sir Barry Denny, Bt.	Succeeded by Sir Barry Denny, Bt. John Blennerhassett
Preceded by Sackville Hamilton; John Francis Cradock	Member of Parliament for Clogher; 1790–1797; With: Sackville Hamilton (1790–95); Hon. Thomas Pelham (1795–97)	Succeeded by Sir John Tydd, Bt. Thomas Burgh
Preceded by Hon. George Fulke Lyttelton; Sir Ross Mahon, Bt.	Member of Parliament for Granard; 1800; With: Sir Ross Mahon, Bt.	Succeeded by Constituency disenfranchised
