= List of Escheators of Leinster =

This is a list of appointments as Escheator of Leinster, a notional 'office of profit under the crown' which was used three times to resign from the Irish House of Commons.

The escheator was originally responsible for the administration of escheat /ɪsˈtʃiːt/, a common law doctrine that transfers the real property of a person who has died without heirs to the crown or state.

The office was formerly substantive. It was founded in 1605, when the escheatorship for Ireland was divided among the provinces of Connaught, Leinster, Munster, and Ulster. The first holder was Nicholas Kenny, who had been escheator-general of Ireland.

== Substantive holders ==
- 1605: Nicholas Kenny
- 9 February 1644: Sir Maurice Eustace, later Lord Chancellor of Ireland
- Patrick Tallant (d. 1663?)
- 1663: Francis Leigh
- in 1739: Lewis Meares
- 1752: George Meares

== Members of the Irish House of Commons ==
- 1798: Sir John Tydd, 1st Baronet (Clogher)
- 1799: Charles Kendal Bushe (Callan)
- 1800: Thomas Stannus (Portarlington)

After the Acts of Union 1800, the office was retained as a sinecure, with occasional legal duties. Walter Glascock was appointed about 1801, and his appointment was renewed by letters patent in 1830, 1837, and 1838. In the latter year, however, all of the Irish escheatorships were abolished by the Lord Lieutenant of Ireland.

== See also ==
- Escheator
- Resignation from the British House of Commons
