= Arabin =

Arabin is a family name originating in Provence in the south of France, as d'Arabin or D’Arabien.

Bartholomew (or Barthélemy) d'Arabin fled France after the revocation of the edict of Nantes in 1685. He settled in Ireland, where his descendants remained until the mid-19th century. Other members of the Arabin family settled in Germany, where their descendants still live. In the 19th century many of the Irish and British Arabins moved to Australia.

== French ancestry ==
Two sons of Jean Arabin, an innkeeper in the small town of Corps - Laurent (known as "Captain Arabin") and Salomon (known as "Captain Roure") - distinguished themselves fighting on the Protestant side in the 16th-century wars of religion in Provence. A third brother, Barthélemy, was probably the grandfather of Jean, a prosperous draper at Riez in the present-day Alpes-de-Haute region of Provence and father of the later Barthélemy.

== Barthélemy d'Arabin ==
Bartholomew (or Barthélemy) d'Arabin de Barcelles (d. 20/1/1712 or 1713) fled to Switzerland and then the Netherlands after the revocation of the edict of Nantes in 1685.

Barthélemy enrolled in the Duke of Schomberg's cavalry regiment and came to England with King William III in 1688. He fought at the Battle of the Boyne in Ireland, 1690, where the Duke of Schomberg was killed. Barthélemy then served under the Marquis of Ruvigny (created Earl of Galway by William III) in Flanders (1692–97) and in Piedmont, Italy, where he was aide-de-camp to Ruvigny.

In 1699 his regiment was disbanded and on 15 July 1699, at St Andrew's Church, Dublin, he married Jeanne Renée de St-Julien, a daughter of Pierre St-Julien de Malacare, another Huguenot refugee and former Lord of Malacaré, near Bordeaux, and Vitré in Brittany. Bartholomew was associated with the Huguenot settlement of 1694 in Portarlington, County Laois.

== Irish and British Arabins ==
- Colonel John (or Jean) Arabin, (1703–1757), son of Bartholomew, raised the 57th (West Middlesex) Regiment of Foot in 1755 for service in the Seven Years' War. He died in Gibraltar, where he was one of the officers of the garrison; there is a memorial plaque to him in the King's Chapel there. Father of William John Arabin.
- John Arabin (1727–1758), attended Trinity College Dublin, after which he followed his father and grandfather into the army, captain in the 14th Irish Dragoons in 1751.
- John Daniell Arabin (1757–1838), son of the above, was an officer in the Royal Irish Artillery, reaching the rank of Lieutenant-General.
- General William John Arabin (1750–1828), Colonel John Arabin's youngest son, Colonel of the 2nd Life Guards, father of William St Julien Arabin (see below).
- William St Julien Arabin (1773–1841), was a British lawyer and judge.
- Henry Arabin (1751 or 1752–1841), a prominent Dublin lawyer, landowner and political activist, ran the Corkagh gunpowder mills in the Clondalkin district. He was a close associate of Daniel O'Connell and author of pamphlets om political and economic subjects.
- Rear-Admiral Septimius Arabin, R.N. (1785–1855), son of Henry, who enjoyed a distinguished naval career during the Napoleonic Wars. He was closely associated with Admiral Sir Sidney Smith and died in Nice, France, where he unsuccessfully tried to recover the family's lost estates in Provence.
- Lt.-Colonel Frederick Arabin (1786–1843), an officer in the Royal Artillery, married Elizabeth, a daughter of Jacob Mountain, first Anglican Bishop of Quebec. He served in the West Indies and Peninsula campaigns of the Napoleonic Wars and in garrisons at Halifax, Nova Scotia, Corfu and (as commanding officer) Bermuda, where he died of yellow fever.
- John Ladeveze Arabin (1794–1863), the youngest of Henry and Ann Arabin's nine sons, became Lord Mayor of Dublin in 1845.

The surname "Arabin" was borrowed by Anthony Trollope for one of the main characters in his novel Barchester Towers, the Rev. Francis Arabin.
