= Baron Howden =

Extinct barony in the Peerage of the United Kingdom

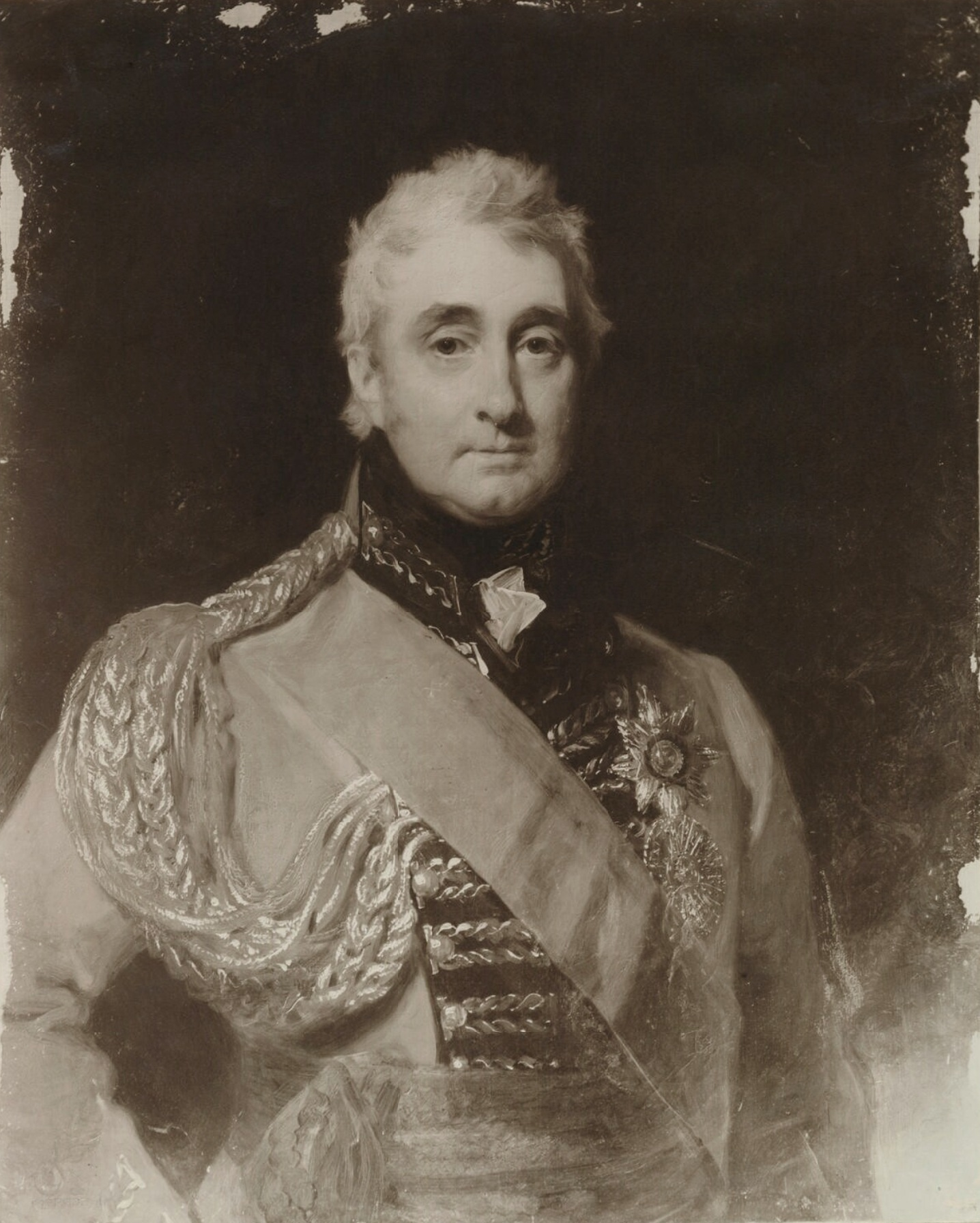
John Cradock, 1st Baron Howden

Baron Howden was a title in both the Peerage of Ireland and the Peerage of the United Kingdom. John Caradoc, the former Governor of the Cape of Good Hope, was created Baron Howden, of Grimston and of Spaldington and of Cradockstown in the County of Kildare, in the Peerage of Ireland on 19 October 1819. On 10 September 1831 he was made Baron Howden, of Howden and Grimston in the County of York, in the Peerage of the United Kingdom. He was the son of the Right Reverend John Cradock, Church of Ireland Archbishop of Dublin. He was succeeded by his son, the second Baron, who was in the Diplomatic Service. On 19 December 1831 he assumed by Royal licence the surname of Caradoc in lieu of his patronymic. Lord Howden was the husband of the Russian princess Catherine Bagration (Pyotr Bagration's widow) and moved into Grimston Park, where he rebuilt the hall. Both baronies became extinct on his death on 9 October 1873.

== Barons Howden (1819/1831) ==
- John Francis Cradock, 1st Baron Howden (1759–1839)
- John Hobart Caradoc, 2nd Baron Howden (1799–1873)
