= Booth Road Celtic F.C. =

Soccer club in Dublin, Ireland

- Full name: Booth Road Celtic Football Club
- Nickname: Booth Road
- Founded: 2001
- Ground: Clondalkin Leisure Centre, Corkagh Park
- Manager: Eric Quinn
- League: LSL Division 3 Sunday
- 2020: 9th
- Website: http://www.boothroadcelticfc.yourclub.ie/

Booth Road Celtic Football Club (more commonly known as Booth Road) is a soccer club based in Clondalkin, Dublin, Ireland.

== History ==
Booth Road Celtic Football Club was founded back in June 2001. The club was founded by Mark Maloney, John Finn, Colm Kernan and the late Graham White and Pearse Butler.

== Notable former players ==
- (Republic of Ireland) Chris Shields
