= John Hobart Caradoc, 2nd Baron Howden =

British politician and general (1799–1873)

John Hobart Caradoc, 2nd Baron Howden, GCB, KH (1799 – 9 October 1873) was a British politician and diplomat.

== Family ==
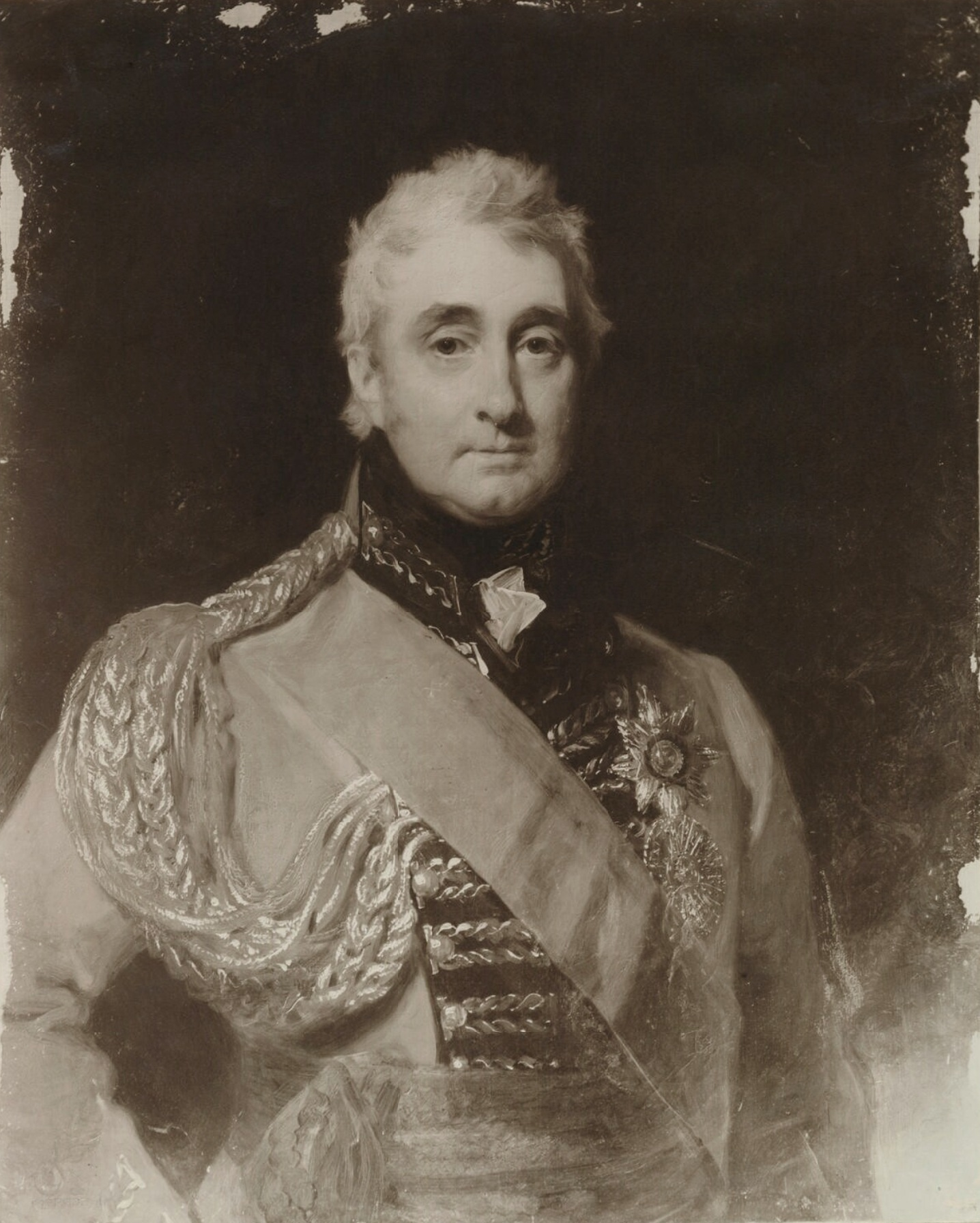
Howden's father, John Cradock, 1st Baron Howden

John Hobart Caradoc was the son of General John Cradock, 1st Baron Howden, a British peer, (1st Baron Howden since 1819) in the Peerage of Ireland and since 1831 in the Peerage of the United Kingdom. He was a politician and soldier instrumental in the 1798 battle of Vinegar Hill, Enniscorthy, County of Wexford, within what is known as the Irish Rebellion. He was, between other things, Governor of the Cape Colony, 1811–1814.

John Hobart Caradoc was therefore, the grandson of John Cradock (1708? – 1778), alias Craddock, Church of Ireland Archbishop of Dublin from 1772, the Irish branch of the Protestant Church of England, nowadays. His accepted family name changed thus in two generations from Craddock to Cradock and then to Caradoc. He married Princess Catherine Bagration, née Countess Skavronskaya in 1830. The union was childless and the couple separated.

== Career ==
He served in parliament as M.P. for Dundalk in 1830–31.

He had been appointed as a liaison officer of the British Army during the siege of the Belgian Antwerp citadel by the French Northern Army of Marshall Gérard end of 1832. For his services he had been made an officer in the Belgian order of Leopold on 10 March 1833 and a commander in 1852.

== Honours ==
- Commander of the Order of Leopold.

== See also ==
- Baron Howden

Parliament of the United Kingdom
Preceded by Charles Barclay	Member of Parliament for Dundalk; 1830 – 1831	Succeeded by James Edward Gordon
Peerage of Ireland
Preceded by John Cradock	Baron Howden; 1839–1873	Extinct
Peerage of the United Kingdom
Preceded by John Cradock	Baron Howden; 1839–1873	Extinct
