= Tydd baronets =

Extinct baronetcy in the Baronetage of Ireland

The Tydd Baronetcy of Lamberton, Queen's County was a title in the Baronetage of Ireland. It was created on 24 July 1795 for John Tydd of Lamberton Park, County Laois. He was the son of French Tydd and Elizabeth Moore. During a long career in politics (1778–1800) he sat in the Irish House of Commons for five constituencies in all.

He died without issue in December 1803, when the title became extinct.

== Tydd Baronets, of Lamberton (1795) ==
- Sir John Tydd, 1st Baronet (c.1740-1803)

== Sources ==
- Belmore, Earl of (1887) Parliamentary Memoirs of Fermanagh and Tyrone 1613-1885 Dublin Alexander Thom and Co.
- Cokayne, G. E. (1906) Complete Baronetage Vol.5 Exeter William Pollard and Co. p. 435
