= Thomas St George (Clogher MP) =

Irish politician

Thomas St George (October 1738 –1 April 1785) was an Irish politician. He sat in the House of Commons of Ireland from 1776 to 1785 as a Member of Parliament (MP) for the borough of Clogher in County Tyrone.

Parliament of Ireland
| Preceded by William Moore; John Staples | Member of Parliament for Clogher; 1776–1785; With: Sir Capel Molyneux, 3rd Bt 1776–1783; Sackville Hamilton from 1783 | Succeeded by Sackville Hamilton; John Francis Cradock |
