= Brabazon Newcomen =

Brabazon Newcomen (1688 – June 1766) was an Anglo-Irish politician.

Newcomen was the Member of Parliament for Kilbeggan in the Irish House of Commons from 1713 to 1727.

Parliament of Ireland
| Preceded by Patrick Fox; Charles Lambart | Member of Parliament for Kilbeggan; 1713–1727; With: John Preston (1713–1715); William FitzHerbert (1715); Charles Lambart (1715–1727) | Succeeded by Charles Lambart; Charles Lambart |
