= Edward Davis (Irish politician) =

Irish politician

Edward Davis was an Irish politician.

Davis was born in County Fermanagh and educated at Trinity College, Dublin.

Davis represented Clogher from 1692 to 1693.
