= Thomas Burgh (MP died 1810) =

Irish politician (d.1810)

Member of Parliament for Fore
- In office 1800–1801 Serving with John Staunton Rochfort
- Preceded by: Sir John Tydd, 1st Bt
- Succeeded by: Constituency abolished

Member of Parliament for Clogher
- In office 1798–1800 Serving with: Sir John Tydd, 1st Bt; Jonah Barrington; William Gardiner
- Preceded by: Richard Townsend Herbert
- Succeeded by: Hon. Richard Annesley

Member of Parliament for Kilbeggan
- In office 1790–1798 Serving with William Sherlock
- Preceded by: Henry Flood
- Succeeded by: Sir Francis Hopkins, 1st Bt

Personal details
- Born: Thomas Burgh
- Died: 1810
- Education: Trinity College, Dublin

Thomas Burgh (died 1810) was an Irish politician who was elected to the Irish House of Commons to represent Kilbeggan (1790–98), Clogher (1798–1800) and Fore (1800).

== Career ==
Burgh was educated at Trinity College, Dublin.

Burgh represented the constituencies of Kilbeggan (1790–1798), Clogher (1798–1800) and Fore (1800).

== See also ==
- House of Burgh, an Anglo-Norman and Hiberno-Norman dynasty founded in 1193

Parliament of Ireland
Preceded by Henry Flood	Member of Parliament for Kilbeggan; 1790–1798; With: William Sherlock	Succeeded by Sir Francis Hopkins, 1st Bt
Preceded by Richard Townsend Herbert	Member of Parliament for Clogher; 1798–1800; With: Sir John Tydd, 1st Bt; Jonah Barrington; William Gardiner	Succeeded by Hon. Richard Annesley
Preceded by Sir John Tydd, 1st Bt	Member of Parliament for Fore; 1800–1801; With: John Staunton Rochfort	Succeeded by Constituency disenfranchised
