= William Moore (Clogher MP) =

Irish politician

Hon. William Moore (11 December 1743 – 21 November 1810) was an Irish politician. He sat in the House of Commons of Ireland from 1765 to 1776 as a Member of Parliament (MP) for the borough of Clogher in County Tyrone, Clonmel in County Tipperary from 1781 to 1792, and for St Johnstown in County Longford from 1798 until his resignation in January 1800 by the procedural device of accepting the office of Escheator of Munster.

He was the third son of Stephen Moore, 1st Viscount Mount Cashell, by his second wife, and younger half-brother of Stephen Moore, 1st Earl Mount Cashell.

Parliament of Ireland
Preceded by Samuel Lowe; Sir Capel Molyneux, 3rd Bt	Member of Parliament for Clogher; 1768–1776; With: Sir Capel Molyneux, 3rd Bt to 1768; John Staples from 1768–1776	Succeeded by Thomas St George; Sir Capel Molyneux, 3rd Bt
Preceded by Stephen Moore I Guy Moore	Member of Parliament for Clonmel; 1781–1798; With: Guy Moore to 1783; Stephen Moore (II) 1783–1790; Lord Kilworth 1790–1792; John Moore 1792–1798	Succeeded by Stephen Moore III; Thomas Worth Newenham
Preceded by Sir William Gleadowe-Newcomen, Bt; Francis Hardy	Member of Parliament for St Johnstown; 1798–January 1800; With: Richard Lovell Edgeworth	Vacant until Parliament of Ireland abolished in January 1801
