= John Lawford =

Royal Navy Admrial (c.1756–1842)

Admiral Sir John Lawford KCB
- Born: c. 1756
- Died: 22 December 1842; Grove Road, St John's Wood
- Military career
- Allegiance: United Kingdom of Great Britain and Ireland
- Branch: Royal Navy
- Rank: Admiral
- Commands: HMS Wasp; HMS Hound; HMS Convert; HMS Agincourt; HMS Romney; HMS Polyphemus; HMS Audacious; HMS Impetueux
- Conflicts: American Revolutionary War; Battle of the Saintes; French Revolutionary Wars; Vlieter Incident; Battle of Copenhagen; Napoleonic Wars
- Awards: Knight Commander of the Order of the Bath

Sir John Lawford KCB (c. 1756 – 22 December 1842) was an officer of the Royal Navy who served during the American War of Independence and the French Revolutionary and Napoleonic Wars.

He had a long and distinguished career, seeing action during the war with America at the Battle of the Saintes, and was commanding small ships during the interwar years and by the outbreak of war with Revolutionary France. He graduated to larger ships, despite the loss of a frigate under his command in 1794, and was commanding HMS Romney in British waters by 1798. His interception of a Swedish convoy in the English Channel further strained relations between Britain and Sweden, though Lawford was also to be involved in the breakup of the League of Armed Neutrality, when he formed part of Rear-Admiral Horatio Nelson's fleet at the Battle of Copenhagen. Another highlight was the capture of a Spanish frigate carrying an immensely valuable cargo of specie. Lawford commanded several ships of the French and Spanish coasts throughout the rest of the wars, until being promoted to flag rank in 1811. He received further promotions throughout his long life, and the award of the KCB for his actions at Copenhagen, the only captain who fought at the battle to receive any honours related to it. He died three years later at the age of 86, having by then spent 65 years serving the navy.

== Early career ==
Lawford was baptised 3 July 1757 in Portsea, the eldest son of John Lawford of Gosport and Sarah Gover of Portsea. He entered the navy at an early age. He served during the war with America, and was first lieutenant aboard the 90-gun HMS Namur at the Battle of the Saintes. In October 1788 he commissioned the brig HMS Wasp and commanded her for the next two years. Lawford then took command of the 16-gun sloop HMS Hound during the Spanish Armament and was stationed initially in the English Channel, before departing for Jamaica on 22 October 1790, where he spent the next two years. He was promoted to post-captain on the outbreak of war with France in 1793, and took command of the newly captured 36-gun HMS Convert. He sailed as an escort for a convoy to Britain on 5 February the following year, but his command was short-lived as Convert was wrecked three days later on a reef off the East End of Grand Cayman; the wreck later referred to as the Wreck of the Ten Sail. While court martialled as a result of the shipwreck, Lawford was acquitted and the event did not adversely affect his career. Lawford remained in service to the Royal Navy and in January 1798 took command of the 64-gun HMS Agincourt. His time aboard her was brief, and in March he handed her over to Captain John Bligh and took up command of Bligh's old ship, the 50-gun HMS Romney.

== Command ==
Lawford and Romney became involved in an incident with a convoy of Swedish merchants sailing from the Mediterranean with cargoes of pitch, hemp, iron, deals and tar. Lawford intercepted the convoy in the English Channel on 30 June, suspecting that the supplies were bound for French forces. The convoy resisted, but Lawford brought them to after a short action and took them to a British port. There most of the ships were condemned, though some were allowed to sail to Portugal. The question of the right of belligerent powers to stop and search neutral merchants on the high seas was firmly upheld by Britain, though incidents such as this strained relations with the northern Kingdoms of Sweden, Denmark and Russia, and was a contributing factor to the formation of the League of Armed Neutrality two years later. Lawford took Romney to join Vice-Admiral Andrew Mitchell's squadron in Den Helder in August 1799, and was present at the Vlieter Incident on 30 August.

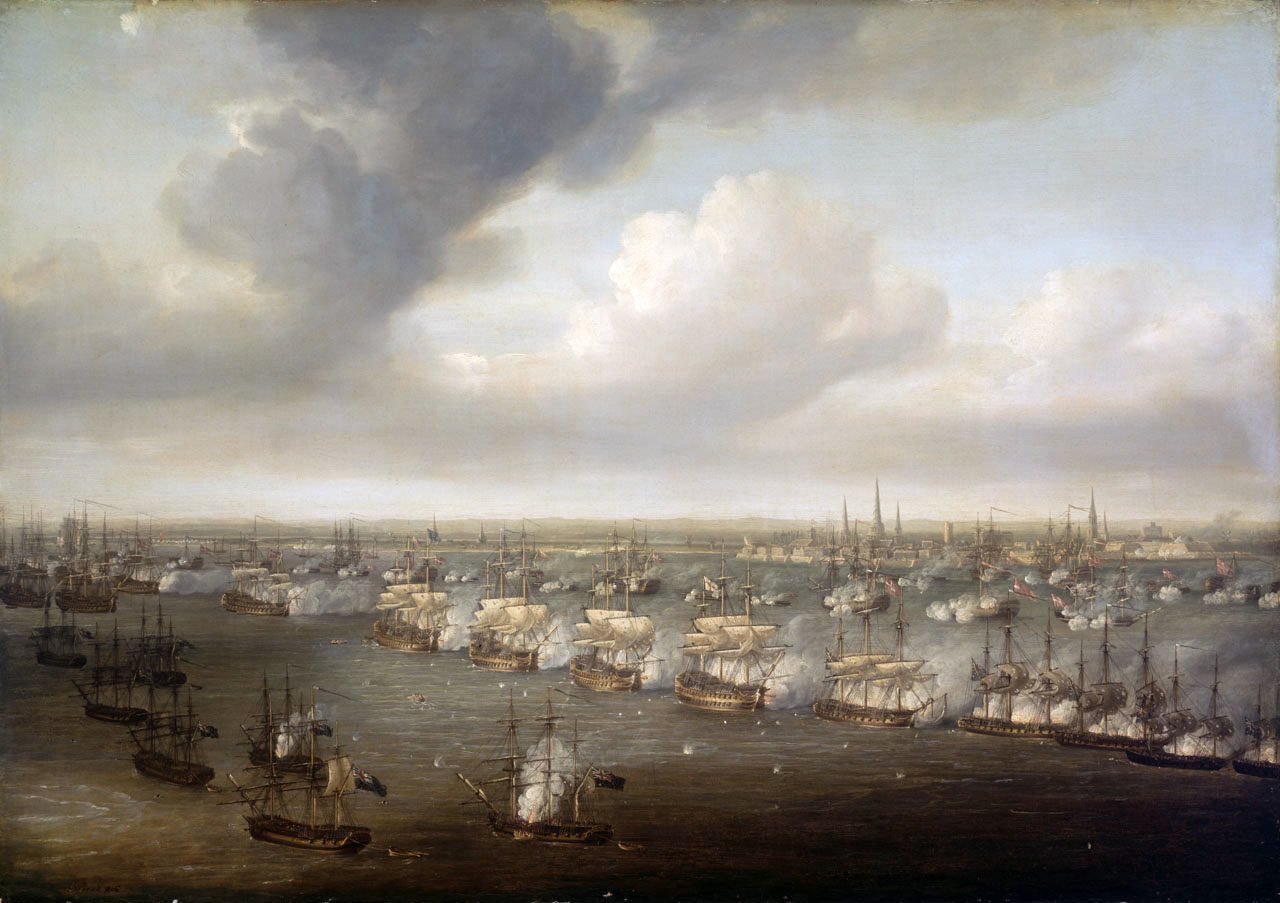
The Battle of Copenhagen, by Nicholas Pocock

Lawford took command of the 64-gun HMS Polyphemus in August 1800, and went out with the fleet sent out under Sir Hyde Parker to compel the Danes to abandon the League of Armed Neutrality. Polyphemus was part of Rear-Admiral Horatio Nelson's squadron sent in to attack the Danish fleet at anchor at the Battle of Copenhagen on 2 April 1801. Polyphemus was not part of Nelson's original plan, but he had to improvise when HMS Agamemnon ran aground on shoals at the entrance to the harbour, and could not free herself. Polyphemus was signalled to take her place, and she anchored at the south of the line, opposite the Provestenen and engaged for the rest of the battle. She eventually sustained casualties of six killed and twenty-five wounded. Polyphemus returned to Britain and was paid off into ordinary in April 1802, and after being refitted at Chatham Dockyard between March and September 1804, was recommissioned under Lawford. Lawford served with the Channel Fleet and on 7 December 1804 engaged the Spanish 36-gun Santa Gertruyda off Cape St Mary. The Santa Gertruyda was captured, and found to be shipping 1,125,000 dollars of specie from Peru and Mexico to Spain.

Lawford commissioned the 74-gun HMS Audacious in June 1805, and moved from there to command the 74-gun HMS Impetueux in October 1806. He served initially in the English Channel, followed by service in the North Sea in 1809 and then off Portugal from March 1810. Lawford was superseded on 1 August 1811, when he was promoted to rear-admiral.

== Later life ==
Lawford was advanced to vice-admiral in 1819, and a full admiral in 1832. In August 1838 he was made a Knight Commander of the Order of the Bath. His award of the KCB was the only honorary reward specifically for gallantry at Copenhagen 37 years previously, made to any of the captains who were present. Admiral Sir John Lawford died at his home at Grove Road, St John's Wood on 22 December 1842 at the age of 86. He had married in 1803, and on his death had served in the navy for 65 years.

He is buried at St John's Wood Chapel with a monument sculpted by Thomas Denman.
