= Thomas Denman (sculptor) =

English sculptor (1787–1861)

Thomas Denman (1787–1861) was a 19th century English sculptor.

== Life ==
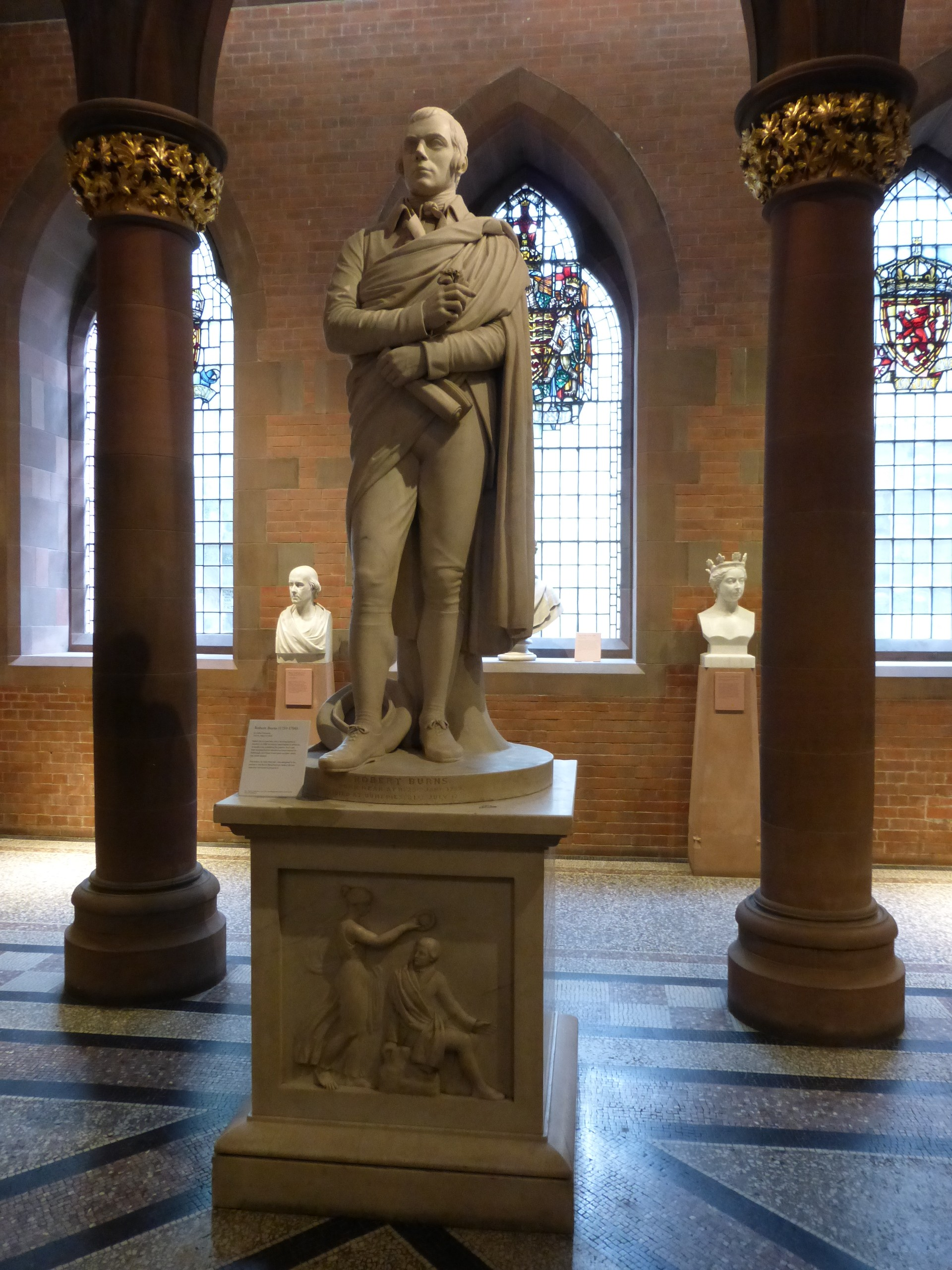
Robert Burns statue attributed to John Flaxman but created by Thomas Denman

He was born in 1787 the son of William Denman and his wife Ann. They lived on Mansell Street in the Aldgate district of London, close to the Tower of London.

He attended the Royal Academy schools from 1807 and won their Silver Medal for sculpture in 1813. He exhibited at the Royal Academy from 1815 to 1836 and at the British Institution from 1818 to 1827.

He was working in the studio of his brother-in-law John Flaxman at the time of Flaxman's death in 1826, and was responsible for completing several of his unfinished projects. Although occasionally acknowledged as the true sculptor, Flaxman is regularly credited with works after his own death. The statue of Robert Burns was placed in the Burns Monument on Calton Hill in 1830, almost certainly created after Flaxman's death. However, most of Denman's commissions seem to have come via the Flaxman studio and work gradually dried up.

He was declared bankrupt in 1847 and was living in Battersea in "reduced circumstances" in 1850. He died in 1861.

== Family ==
His sister Nancy Denman married the eminent sculptor John Flaxman. Flaxman took a shine to the younger daughter of the Denman family, Maria Denman, and left Maria a great deal in his will. Flaxman's portrait of Maria is held in the Soane Museum.

== Known artworks ==
- Monument to Sir Joseph Mawbey at Chertsey (1817)
- Monument to George Lloyd at Snitterfield (c. 1817)
- Monument to William Dyke at Figheldean (1818)
- Monument to William Adams at South Mimms (1820)
- Monument to John Trevenen at Helston, Cornwall (1825)
- Statue of Marquess of Hastings for Calcutta (1826/7 completing Flaxman's commission)
- Monument to James Watson in Heston, Middlesex (1826/7 completing Flaxman's commission)
- Monument to John Philip Kemble in Westminster Abbey (1826/7 completing Flaxman's commission)
- Statue of Robert Burns designed for Burns Monument in Edinburgh but now in the Scottish National Portrait Gallery (1826/7 fulfilling commission for Flaxman - gallery wrongly attributes to Flaxman who wad dead)
- Monument to General William John Arabin at West Drayton (1828)
- Monument to Paul Benfield in St Mary's Church, Leicester (1828)
- Internal decoration at Buckingham Palace (1829) (fulfilling a commission intended for Flaxman)
- Monument to Francis Pym MP at Sandy, Bedfordshire (1833)
- Monument to Charles Philip Yorke in Wimpole, Cambridgeshire (1834)
- Statue of Thomas Telford (1836) location unknown
- Monument to Read Admiral John Tower at South Weald (1837)
- Monument to Charlotte daughter of Herbert Barrett Curteis at Wartling (1838)
- Monument to Sir Philip Broke at Nacton (1841)
- Monument to Lady Heathcote at Normanton, Rutland (1842)
- Monument to Sir John Lawford at St John's Wood Chapel (1842)
- War memorial to the officers and men of the 13th Light Infantry at Canterbury Cathedral (1843)
- Monument to Mary Morphew at Terrington St Clement (1843)
- Monument to Lt James Fuller at Holy Trinity Church in Marylebone (1843)
- Monument to Sir Gore Ouseley at Hertingfordbury (1844)
- Monument to Sir John Eardley-Wilmot, 1st Baronet at Berkswell (1847)
