= Sackville Hamilton =

Anglo-Irish politician

Sackville Hamilton PC

Member of Parliament for Armagh Borough
- In office 1796–1798 Serving with Robert Hobart, Lord Hobart
- Preceded by: George Rawson; Robert Hobart, Lord Hobart
- Succeeded by: Hon. Thomas Pelham; Patrick Duigenan

Member of Parliament for Clogher
- In office 1783–1795 Serving with Thomas St George, John Francis Cradock, Richard Townsend Herbert
- Preceded by: Sir Capel Molyneux, 3rd Bt; Thomas St George
- Succeeded by: Hon. Thomas Pelham; Richard Townsend Herbert

Member of Parliament for Rathcormack
- In office 1783–1783 Serving with Charles Francis Sheridan
- Preceded by: William Tonson; Francis Bernard Beamish
- Succeeded by: Charles Francis Sheridan; Thomas Orde

Member of Parliament for St Johnstown (County Longford)
- In office 1780–1783 Serving with Hon. John Vaughan
- Preceded by: Sir Ralph Fetherston, 1st Bt; Hon. John Vaughan
- Succeeded by: Sir Thomas Fetherston, 2nd Bt; Nicholas Colthurst

Personal details
- Born: 14 March 1732
- Died: 29 January 1818 (aged 85)
- Spouse: Arabella Berkeley
- Parent(s): Hon. Henry Hamilton; Mary Dawson
- Relatives: Henry Hamilton (brother); Frederick Hamilton (uncle); Gustavus Hamilton (uncle); Gustavus Hamilton, 1st Viscount Boyne (grandfather)

Sackville Hamilton PC (Ire) (14 March 1732 – 29 January 1818) was an Anglo-Irish politician.

== Early life ==
Hamilton was born on 14 March 1732. He was the third son, of seven children born to Mary Dawson (daughter of Joshua Dawson) and Hon. Henry Hamilton, MP and Collector of the Port of Cork. His younger brother was Henry Hamilton, who served as royal Governor of Bermuda and Dominica.

His uncles were Frederick Hamilton and Gustavus Hamilton. His grandfather was Gustavus Hamilton, 1st Viscount Boyne, his great-grandfather was Sir Frederick Hamilton, and his great-great grandfather was Claud Hamilton, 1st Lord Paisley.

== Career ==
Hamilton entered the Irish House of Commons for St Johnstown (County Longford) in 1780 and sat for the constituency until 1783. Subsequently he was elected for Rathcormack and Clogher. He chose the latter and was a Member of Parliament for the constituency until 1795, resigning the seat to be Escheator of Munster, a notional 'office of profit under the crown'. In the following year he stood successfully for Armagh Borough, which he represented until 1798.

In 1780, Hamilton was appointed Under-Secretary to the Lord Lieutenant of Ireland. He held this post until February 1795 and again from May of the same year until 1796. In 1796, he was sworn of the Privy Council of Ireland.

== Personal life ==
He married Arabella Berkeley, daughter of Reverend Dr. Robert Berkeley, Bishop of Cloyne. Together, they were the parents of a son:

- Henry Hamilton (d. 1850), who in 1808 married Hon. Caroline Penelope Pakenham (d. 1854), a daughter of Edward Pakenham, 2nd Baron Longford, sister of Thomas Pakenham, 2nd Earl of Longford and Catherine Wellesley, Duchess of Wellington (wife of Arthur Wellesley, 1st Duke of Wellington).
- Rev. Sackville Robert Hamilton (d. 1853), the Rector at Mallow who married Jane Freeman, daughter of Edward Deane Freeman, High Sheriff of County Cork.

Hamilton died on 29 January 1818.

=== Descendants ===
Through his son Sackville, he was a grandfather of Sackville Deane Hamilton (1808–1878), who married Eleanor Sankey, and General Henry Hamilton (1812–1891), who married Isabella Freeman (a daughter of Joseph Deane Freeman).

Parliament of Ireland
Preceded by Sir Ralph Fetherston, 1st Bt; Hon. John Vaughan	Member of Parliament for St Johnstown (County Longford); 1780–1783; With: Hon. John Vaughan	Succeeded by Sir Thomas Fetherston, 2nd Bt; Nicholas Colthurst
Preceded by William Tonson; Francis Bernard Beamish	Member of Parliament for Rathcormack; 1783; With: Charles Francis Sheridan	Succeeded by Charles Francis Sheridan; Thomas Orde
Preceded by Sir Capel Molyneux, 3rd Bt; Thomas St George	Member of Parliament for Clogher; 1783–1795; With: Thomas St George 1783–1785; John Francis Cradock 1785–1790; Richard Townsend Herbert 1790–1795	Succeeded by Hon. Thomas Pelham; Richard Townsend Herbert
Preceded by George Rawson; Robert Hobart, Lord Hobart	Member of Parliament for Armagh Borough; 1796–1798; With: Robert Hobart, Lord Hobart	Succeeded by Hon. Thomas Pelham; Patrick Duigenan
