= Governor Lyttelton =

Governor Lyttelton may refer to:

- Charles Lyttelton, 10th Viscount Cobham (1909–1977), 9th Governor-General of New Zealand from 1957 to 1962
- William Lyttelton, 1st Baron Lyttelton (1724–1808), Colonial Governor of South Carolina from 1756 to 1760 and Governor of Jamaica from 1762 to 1766
