= Francis Leigh (MP for Kildare) =

Irish (Jacobite) politician

Francis Leigh (fl. 1663–1692) was an Irish Jacobite politician.

Leigh was the son of John Leigh of County Kildare. On 22 July 1663, Leigh was appointed Escheator of Leinster by Charles II of England. In 1689 he was elected as a Member of Parliament for Kildare Borough in the short-lived Patriot Parliament summoned by James II of England. James II also appointed him as an assessor of taxation for County Kildare. Following the conclusion of the Williamite War in Ireland, Leigh was attainted in 1691 and forfeited his entire estate.

Parliament of Ireland
| Preceded by Sir Thomas Harman; John Pecke | Member of Parliament for Kildare Borough; 1689; With: Robert Porter | Succeeded by Thomas Medlycott; Francis Robartes |
