= 1816 Armagh City by-election =

By-election to the Parliament of the United Kingdom

The 1816 Armagh City by-election was held on 8 May 1816 following the death of Patrick Duigenan. The Tories held the seat electing Daniel Webb Webber to serve the Armagh City constituency which he did until the 1818 general election.

1816 Armagh City by-election
Party	Candidate	Votes	%	±%
Tory	Daniel Webb Webber	Unopposed		
Tory hold				
