= Sir Capel Molyneux, 3rd Baronet =

Irish politician

The Right Honourable Sir Capel Molyneux, Bt PC (Ire)
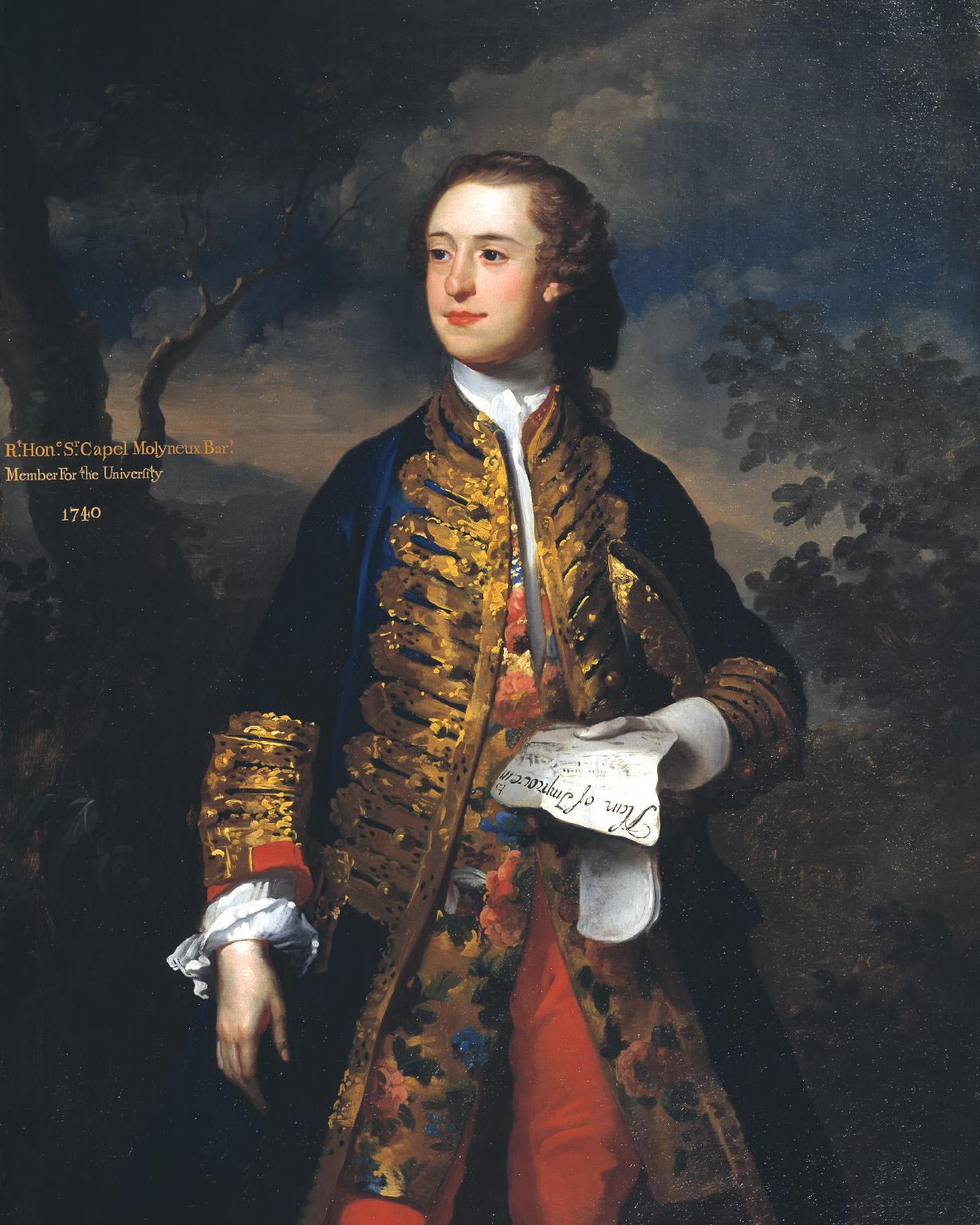

Member of Parliament for Clogher
- In office 1776–1783 Serving with Thomas St George
- Preceded by: John Staples; William Moore
- Succeeded by: Sackville Hamilton; Thomas St George

Member of Parliament for Dublin University
- In office 1768–1776 Serving with Philip Tisdall
- Preceded by: William Clement; Philip Tisdall
- Succeeded by: Richard Hely-Hutchinson; Walter Burgh

Member of Parliament for Clogher
- In office 1761–1768 Serving with Samuel Lowe, William Moore
- Preceded by: Richard Vincent; Nehemiah Nixon Donnellan
- Succeeded by: John Staples; William Moore

Personal details
- Born: 1717
- Died: August 1797 (aged 79–80)
- Spouses: Elizabeth East (m. 1747; died 1757) Elizabeth Adlercron (after 1766)

Sir Capel Molyneux, 3rd Baronet PC (Ire) (1717 – August 1797) was an Irish politician.

== Early life ==
Capel was the son of Sir Thomas Molyneux, 1st Baronet and his second wife Catherine Howard, daughter of Professor Ralph Howard. In 1738 he succeeded his brother Daniel to the title of Baronet and to all the family estates except Castle Dillon, which he did not inherit until 1759, when the former wife of his late first cousin died.

Capel graduated with a Bachelor of Arts in 1737 and received an honorary LLD in 1768.

== Career ==
He was appointed High Sheriff of Armagh in 1744 and sat for Clogher in the Irish House of Commons from 1761 to 1768. Subsequently, he represented Dublin University to 1776 and then again for Clogher to 1783. He was invested to the Privy Council of Ireland in 1776.

== Marriages and children ==
His first marriage was in 1747 to Elizabeth East, sister of Sir William East, 1st Baronet, they had two sons and two daughters:

- Sir Capel Molyneux, 4th Baronet (1750–1832), who married Margaret O'Donnell, daughter of Sir Neal O'Donnell, 1st Baronet, in 1785.
- George William Molyneux (1751–1806), who served as MP for Granard.
- Anne Molyneux, who married Sir Anthony Brabazon, 1st Baronet.
- Harriet Molyneux (d. 1866), who married Gen. William John Arabin.

In 1757 his first wife died and he married Elizabeth Adlercron, a daughter of Elizabeth Arabin and Lt. Gen. John Adlercron, formerly Commander-in-Chief, India, on 17 August 1766. By her he had two sons:

- Sir Thomas Molyneux, 5th Baronet (1766–1841), who married Elizabeth Perrin, daughter of Thomas Perrin, in 1800.
- John Molyneux (1769–1832) of the Royal Navy who married Ella Young, daughter of John Young, in 1800.

Sir Capel died in August 1797 and was succeeded in the baronetcy by his eldest son, Capel.

=== Descendants ===
Through his daughter Anne, he was a grandfather of Sir William Brabazon, 2nd Baronet, and Sarah Brabazon (who married Henry Roper-Curzon, 14th Baron Teynham). Through his daughter Harriet, he was a grandfather of William St Julien Arabin, who served as the Judge-Advocate-General of the Army.

Parliament of Ireland
Preceded by Richard Vincent; Nehemiah Nixon Donnellan	Member of Parliament for Clogher; 1761–1768; With: Samuel Lowe 1761–65; William Moore 1765–68	Succeeded by John Staples; William Moore
Preceded by William Clement; Philip Tisdall	Member of Parliament for Dublin University; 1768–1776; With: Philip Tisdall	Succeeded by Richard Hely-Hutchinson; Walter Burgh
Preceded by John Staples; William Moore	Member of Parliament for Clogher; 1776–1783; With: Thomas St George	Succeeded by Sackville Hamilton; Thomas St George
Baronetage of Ireland
Preceded by Daniel Molyneux	Baronet (of Castle Dillon); 1733–1797	Succeeded by Capel Molyneux
