= Hopkins baronets =

Extinct baronetcy in the Baronetage of the United Kingdom

There have been two baronetcies created for persons with the surname Hopkins, one in the Baronetage of Ireland and one in the Baronetage of the United Kingdom.

The Hopkins Baronetcy, of Athboy in the County of Meath, was created in the Baronetage of Ireland on 25 July 1795 for Francis Hopkins. The title became extinct on the death of the second Baronet.

The Hopkins Baronetcy, of St Pancras in the county of London, is a title in the Baronetage of the United Kingdom. It was created on 3 July 1929 for John Hopkins. He served as MP for St Pancras South East from 1918 to 1923, and from 1924 to 1929. The Baronetcy became extinct on his death in 1946.

== Hopkins baronets, of Athboy (1795) ==
Escutcheon of the Hopkins baronets of Athboy

- Sir Francis Hopkins, 1st Baronet (2 August 1756 – 19 September 1814)
- Sir Francis Hopkins, 2nd Baronet (28 May 1813 – 11 May 1860)

== Hopkins baronets, of St Pancras (1929) ==
Escutcheon of the Hopkins baronets of St Pancras

- Sir John Wells Wainwright Hopkins, 1st Baronet (16 February 1863 – 16 February 1946)
