= Kilbeggan (Parliament of Ireland constituency) =

Pre-1801 Irish constituency

- Former borough constituency for the Irish House of Commons
- County: County Westmeath
- Borough: Kilbeggan

1612–1801
- Replaced by: Disfranchised

Kilbeggan was a constituency represented in the Irish House of Commons from 1612 to 1800.

== History ==
The borough was incorporated by James I by a Charter dated 27 February 1612. The charter conferred upon the elected portreeve and burgesses the right to return two Members to Parliament. In the Patriot Parliament of 1689 summoned by James II, Kilbeggan was represented by two members. Between 1725 and 1793 Catholics and those married to Catholics could not vote.

A sum of £15,000 was paid at the 1801 Union, to Gustavus Lambart as compensation for the loss of the elective franchise.

== Members of Parliament, 1612–1801 ==
- 1613–1615 Sir Robert Newcomen and Beverly Newcomen
- 1634–1635 Edward Keating and Robert Birley
- 1639–1649 Sir Robert Forth and John Warren (Warren died and was replaced in 1647 by Richard Lambart.
- 1661–1666 Walter Lambert (died and replaced 1665 by Francis Willoughby) and Oliver Lambert of Painstown

=== 1689–1801 ===
Election	First MP		Second MP	
1689	Bryan Geoghegan		Charles Geoghegan	
1692	Oliver Lambart		John Wakeley	
1695	Oliver Lambart		Charles Lambart	
1703	Patrick Fox		Charles Lambart	
1713	Brabazon Newcomen		John Preston (Note: Also elected for County Meath in 1713, for which he chose to sit.)	
1715	Brabazon Newcomen		William FitzHerbert	
1715	Brabazon Newcomen		Charles Lambart	
1727	Charles Lambart		Charles Lambart	
1741	Gustavus Lambart		Charles Lambart	
1753	Gustavus Lambart		Hamilton Lambart	
1761	Gustavus Lambart		Thomas Tipping	
1768	Gustavus Lambart		Charles Lambart	
1776	Sir Richard Johnston, 1st Bt		Charles Lambart	
1783	Henry Flood	Patriot	John Philpot Curran	Patriot
1790	Thomas Burgh		William Sherlock	
1798	Sir Francis Hopkins, 1st Bt		Gustavus Lambart	
1800	Thomas Goold		Gustavus Lambart	
1801	Disenfranchised			

== Bibliography ==
- O'Hart, John (2007). The Irish and Anglo-Irish Landed Gentry: When Cromwell came to Ireland. Vol. II. Heritage Books. ISBN 978-0-7884-1927-0.
- Leigh Rayment's historical List of Members of the Irish House of Commons. Cites: Johnston-Liik, Edith Mary (2002). The History of the Irish Parliament 1692-1800 (6 volumes). Ulster Historical Foundation.
