= Sir Francis Hopkins, 1st Baronet =

Sir Francis Hopkins, 1st Baronet (2 August 1756 – 19 September 1814) was an Anglo-Irish politician.

Hopkins was the son of Francis Hopkins and Martha Burton. He worked as a land agent and magistrate. In the latter role he was responsible for leading a company of militia in the dispersal of a group of United Irishmen. He was rewarded by being made a baronet, of Athboy in the Baronetage of Ireland, in July 1795. Hopkins was the Member of Parliament for Kilbeggan in the Irish House of Commons between 1798 and 1800, shortly before the seat's disenfranchisement under the Acts of Union 1800.

He married, on 2 June 1811, Eleanor Thompson second daughter to the late Skeffington Thompson, of Rathnally and they had three children. Hopkins was succeeded in his title by his only son, also called Francis.

Parliament of Ireland
| Preceded by Thomas Burgh; William Sherlock | Member of Parliament for Kilbeggan; 1798–1800; With: Gustavus Lambart | Succeeded by Thomas Goold; Gustavus Lambart |
Baronetage of Ireland
| New creation | Baronet (of Athboy); 1795–1814 | Succeeded by Francis Hopkins |
