= John Cradock, 1st Baron Howden =

British Army officer, politician and colonial administrator

General The Right Honourable The Lord Howden GCB
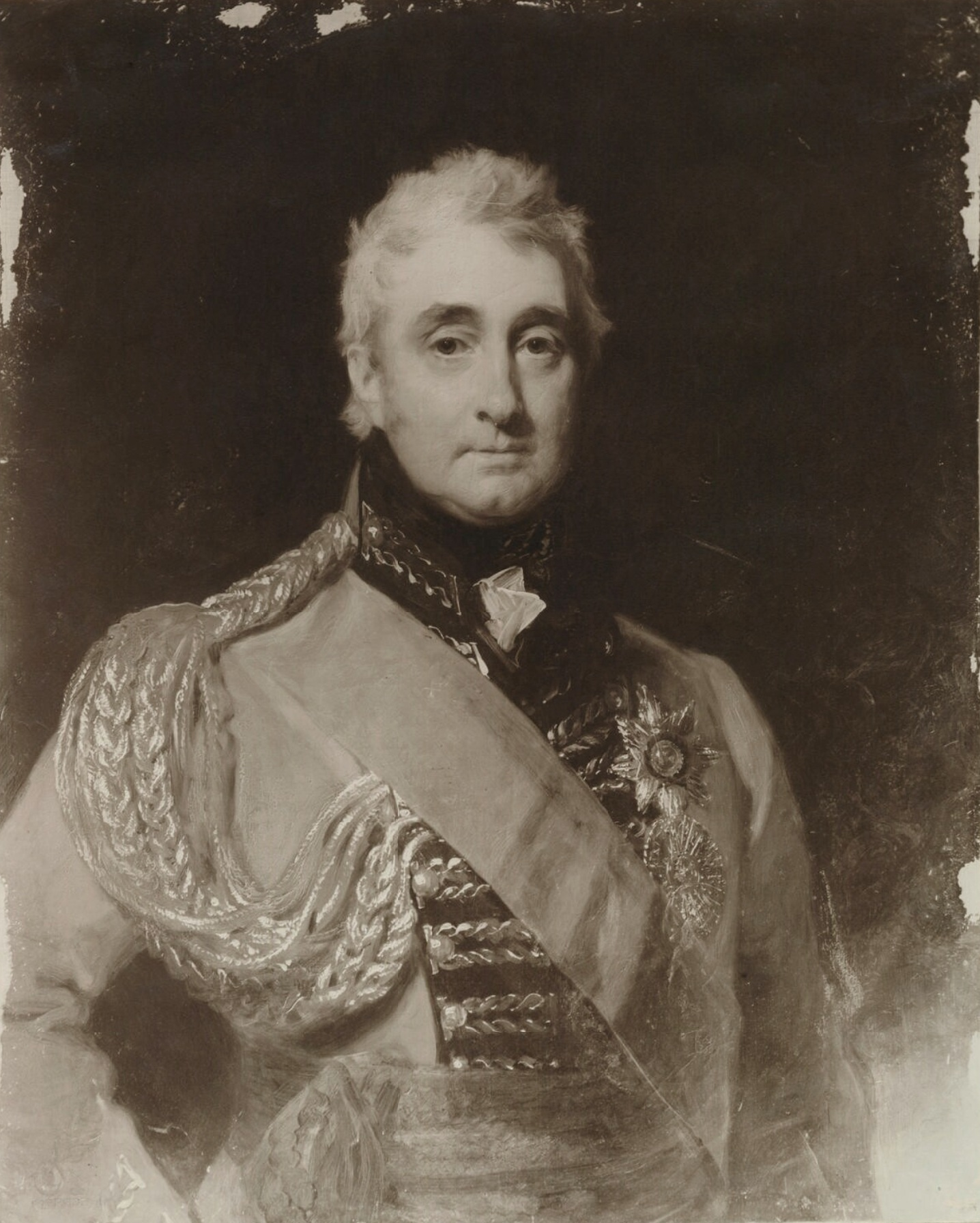
- Portrait by Sir Thomas Lawrence

Governor of the Cape Colony
- In office 1811–1814
- Monarch: George III
- Preceded by: The Earl of Caledon
- Succeeded by: Lord Charles Somerset

Personal details
- Born: 11 August 1759
- Died: 26 July 1839 (aged 79)
- Awards: Knight Grand Cross of the Order of the Bath

Military service
- Allegiance: Great Britain; United Kingdom
- Branch/service: British Army
- Years of service: 1777–1839
- Rank: General
- Commands: Madras Army
- Battles/wars: Irish Rebellion

General John Francis Cradock, 1st Baron Howden (11 August 1759 – 26 July 1839) was a British Army officer, politician and colonial administrator.

== Life ==
He was son of John Cradock, Church of Ireland Archbishop of Dublin. In 1775 he was admitted to St John's College, Cambridge. In 1777, he was appointed a cornet in the 4th Regiment of Horse, which in 1779 he exchanged to become an ensign in the Coldstream Regiment of Foot Guards, and in 1781 he was promoted a lieutenant with the rank of captain. In 1785 he purchased a commission as a major in the 12th Dragoons, exchanging this in 1786 for a post in the 13th Foot, where he was appointed lieutenant-colonel in 1789.

He commanded the 13th in the West Indies in 1790, and served a second time in the West Indies commanding a battalion of grenadiers in 1793, where he was wounded at the reduction of Martinique and appointed the aide-de-camp of Sir Charles Grey, receiving the thanks of Parliament for his services. In 1795 he was appointed colonel of the 127th Foot, and placed on half-pay when that regiment was reduced in 1797. He was appointed major-general in 1798, and served in the Irish Rebellion of 1798 as quartermaster-general in Ireland, seeing action the Battle of Vinegar Hill. He accompanied Cornwallis in his campaign against the French forces landed in Ireland, and was severely wounded at the Battle of Ballinamuck.

Cradock entered the Irish House of Commons for Clogher in 1785. In 1790, he stood as Member of Parliament for Castlebar, a seat he held until 1798. He then represented Midleton from 1799 to 1800 and subsequently Thomastown to the Act of Union in 1801. The year before he had been appointed to command the second battalion of the 54th Foot, and again placed on half-pay when that battalion was reduced in 1802. In 1803 he was appointed to the 71st Foot.

In 1801 he was on the staff in the Mediterranean under Sir Ralph Abercromby, seeing action several times and serving as second-in-command of a division in the field. After the surrender of Cairo and Alexandria, at which he was present, he was despatched with a force to occupy Corsica and Naples, but was recalled en route after the Peace of Amiens was signed. He was then appointed Commander-in-Chief of the Madras Army; after the departure of Lord Lake he commanded the whole of the forces in the Iberian Peninsula for almost a year. In 1808 he was appointed to command the forces in Portugal, handing over command to Arthur Wellesley on 22 April 1809. From there he moved to the command of the 43rd (Monmouthshire) Light Infantry in January 1809, briefly serving as the Governor of Gibraltar later that year.

In 1811 he was appointed Governor of the Cape Colony and commander of the forces on that station, resigning in 1814 and being succeeded by Lord Charles Somerset. He was promoted full general in 1814, elevated to the Peerage of Ireland as Baron Howden in 1819, and to the Peerage of the United Kingdom under the same title in 1831. The town of Cradock, South Africa, is named after him. On 17 November 1798, Cradock married Lady Theodosia Sarah Frances Meade (b. c. 1773; d. 13 Dec 1853), Lady Theodosia was the daughter of John Meade, 1st Earl of Clanwilliam. Cradock named the town of Clanwilliam, South Africa, after his father-in-law.

== Notes ==
Parliament of Ireland
Preceded by Sackville Hamilton; Thomas St George	Member of Parliament for Clogher; 1785–1790; With: Sackville Hamilton	Succeeded by Sackville Hamilton; Richard Townsend Herbert
Preceded by James Browne; Thomas Warren	Member of Parliament for Castlebar; 1790–1797; With: Edward FitzGerald	Succeeded by Thomas Lindsay; Denis Browne
Preceded by Benjamin Blake Woodward; Richard Hardinge	Member of Parliament for Midleton; 1799–1800; With: Benjamin Blake Woodward	Succeeded by Benjamin Blake Woodward; Hon. Richard Annesley
Preceded by Hon. Charles William Stewart; William Gardiner	Member of Parliament for Thomastown; 1800–1801; With: William Gardiner	Succeeded by Parliament of the United Kingdom
Military offices
Preceded by James Stuart	C-in-C, Madras Army; 1804–1807	Succeeded by Hay McDowall
Government offices
Preceded by Sir Hew Dalrymple	Governor of Gibraltar (acting); 1809	Succeeded by Colin Campbell
Preceded by Henry George Grey (acting)	Governor of the Cape Colony; 1811–1814	Succeeded by Lord Charles Somerset
Peerage of Ireland
New creation	Baron Howden; 1819–1839	Succeeded by John Hobart Caradoc
Peerage of the United Kingdom
New creation	Baron Howden; 1831–1839	Succeeded by John Hobart Caradoc
