= John Ormsby Vandeleur (MP for Granard) =

Irish politician (1767–1822)

John Ormsby Vandeleur (17 April 1767 – 3 November 1822) was an Irish politician. He sat in the Irish House of Commons as a Member of Parliament (MP) for Granard from 1790 to 1798.

Parliament of Ireland
Preceded by George William Molyneux; Robert Jephson	Member of Parliament for Granard; 1790–1798; With: Thomas Pakenham Vandeleur	Succeeded by George Fulke Lyttelton; William Fulk Greville
