= George Lyttelton, 2nd Baron Lyttelton =

Anglo-Irish peer & politician (1763-1828)

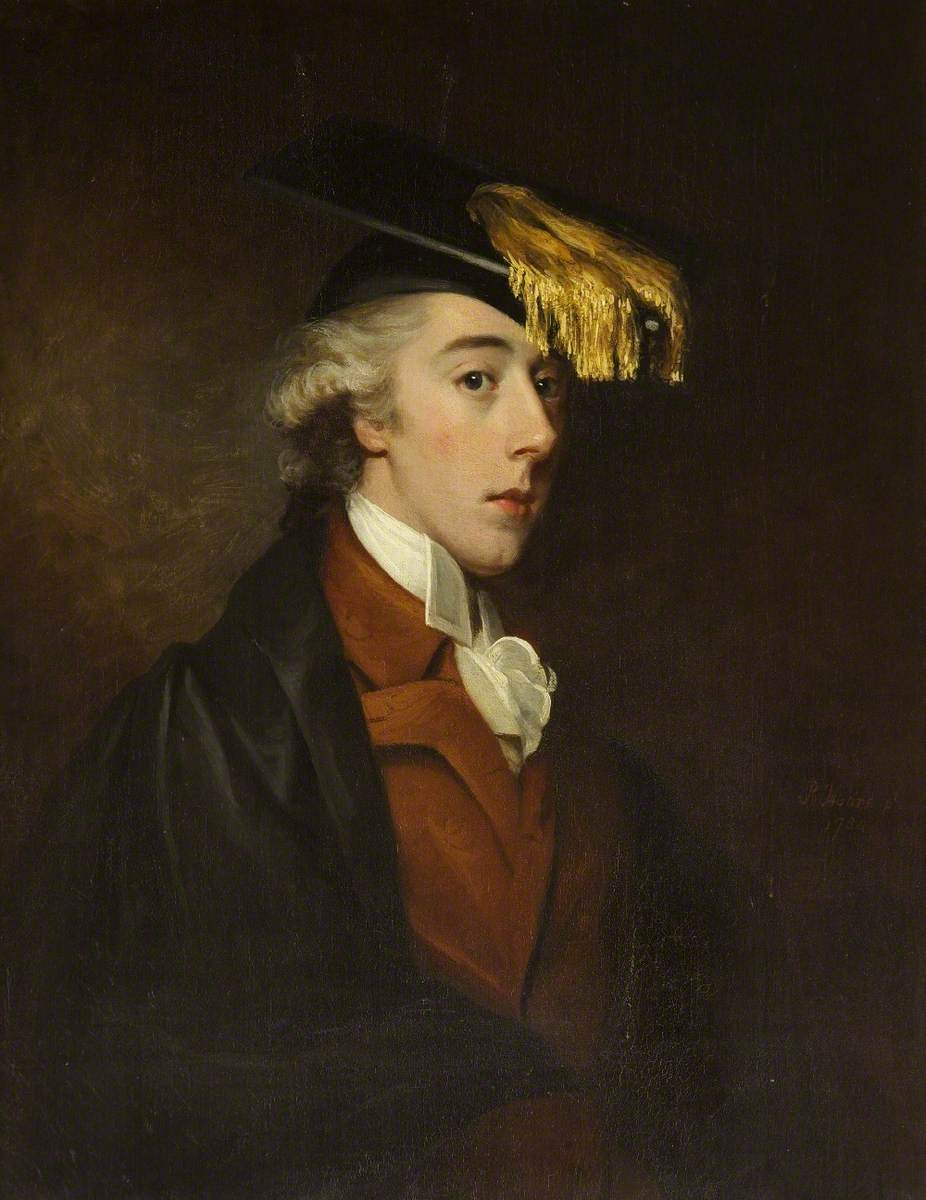
George Fulke Lyttelton, 1784 portrait

George Fulke Lyttelton, 2nd Baron Lyttelton (27 October 1763 – 12 November 1828) was an Anglo-Irish peer and politician from the Lyttelton family.

He was the eldest son of William Lyttelton, 1st Baron Lyttelton and his first wife Martha Macartney. Between 1798 and 1800, Lyttelton represented Granard in the Irish House of Commons.

He succeeded his father as member of parliament for Bewdley in 1790; and to his title and his estates in Hagley, Halesowen, and Frankley in 1808. He died unmarried and was succeeded by his half-brother William Henry Lyttelton, 3rd Baron Lyttelton.

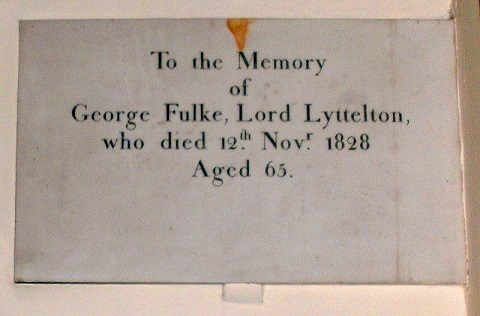
St John the Baptist Church, Hagley, memorial to George Fulke Lyttelton, 2nd Baron Lyttelton (1763–1828)

Parliament of Great Britain
Preceded by William Lyttelton	Member of Parliament for Bewdley; 1790–1796	Succeeded by Miles Peter Andrews
Parliament of Ireland
Preceded by John Ormsby Vandeleur; Thomas Pakenham Vandeleur	Member of Parliament for Granard; 1798–1800; With: William Fulk Greville 1798; Ross Mahon 1798–1800	Succeeded by Richard Townsend Herbert; Ross Mahon
Peerage of Great Britain
Preceded by William Henry Lyttelton	Baron Lyttelton; 1808–1828	Succeeded by William Henry Lyttelton
Peerage of Ireland
Preceded by William Henry Lyttelton	Baron Westcote; 1808–1828	Succeeded by William Henry Lyttelton
