= William John Arabin =

British army commander (1750–1827)

General William John Arabin
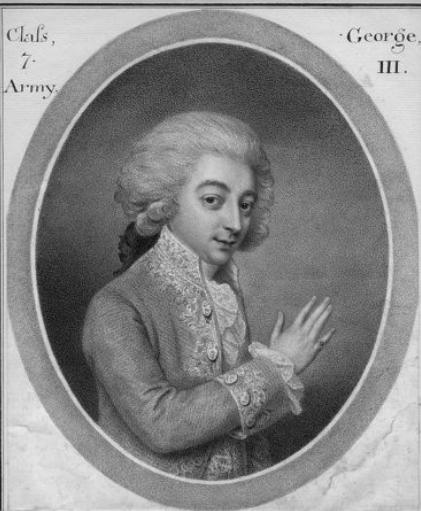
- Born: 1750; Dublin, Ireland
- Died: 1827 (aged 76–77); West Drayton, London, England
- Burial place: West Drayton Parish Church
- Children: William St Julien Arabin
- Military career
- Allegiance: United Kingdom
- Branch: British Army
- Rank: General

General William John Arabin (1750–1827) was an 18th/19th century British Army commander of Irish/French descent who was a flamboyant figure during the Napoleonic Wars. In the terminology of the day, he was a "macaroni".

== Life ==
He was born in Dublin on 27 December 1750, the son of Colonel John Arabin (1703–1757) famed for raising the 57th (West Middlesex) Regiment of Foot at the onset of the Seven Years' War, and his French wife Jeanne Marie Bertin.

In 1789 he was a colonel in the British Army. He was promoted to major general in 1798.

In 1812 he was living in West Drayton and was involved in a court case at the Old Bailey when he prosecuted a local man, William Little, for stealing a fowl worth 18 old pence (£0.08). Little was found Not Guilty.

In 1819 he purchased the Lind estate which sat on the shoreline near Ryde on the Isle of Wight.

On 4 June 1814 he was promoted to full general.

He died on 13 September 1827 in West Drayton and was buried at West Drayton Parish Church. His tomb was sculpted by Thomas Denman. His will was settled in February 1829 and is held at the National Archive at Kew.

== Artistic recognition ==
General Arabin was portrayed in foppish stance by James Gillray in 1802 at the height of the Napoleonic Wars.

== Family ==
He married twice:

Firstly to Henrietta Molyneux, daughter of Sir Capel Molyneux, 3rd Baronet, secondly to Catherine Louisa Le Marchant. Rarely for the times, he divorced his wife Henrietta for adultery with Thomas Sutton of Moulsey in 1786. His second wife Catherine (1771-1834) was from Guernsey and was twenty years his junior.

He had at least six children:

- Gustavis Arabin
- William St Julien Arabin
- Mary Elizabeth Arabin
- Alfred Arabin
- Laura Mary Caroline Arabin
- Admiral Septimus Arabinus Arabin (1798–1856)

He had at least one illegitimate son: Thomas born in 1820, the son of Jane Kemp, a servant at his mansion at Ryde.
