= Clogher (Parliament of Ireland constituency) =

Pre-1801 Irish constituency

Coordinates: 54.410°N 7.173°W

- Former borough constituency for the Irish House of Commons
- County: County Tyrone
- Borough: Clogher

1264–1801
- Seats: 2
- Replaced by: Disfranchised

Clogher was a borough constituency in the Irish House of Commons until 1800. It represented the "city" of Clogher in County Tyrone. The city, actually no more than a village, gained its importance as the site of the cathedral of the Church of Ireland diocese of Clogher. The constituency was a rotten borough in the gift of the bishop. When the constituency was disestablished, bishop John Porter's claim for £15,000 compensation was disallowed.

== Members of Parliament, 1264–1801 ==
| Election | First MP | | Second MP |
|---|---|---|---|
| 1613 | George Watkins | | William Ferrar |
| 1634 | Sir Henry Spotteswood | | Edward Ascough |
| 1639 | George Wandesford | | Henry Mannings |
| 1661 | Edward Cook | | Matthew Draper, died and repl. 1661 by John Paine |
| 1689 | Clogher was not represented in the Patriot Parliament | | |
| 1692 | Edward Davis | | John Rogerson (Note: Knighted in 1693) |
| August 1695 | William Wolseley (Note: Also elected for Longford Borough in 1695, for which he chose to sit) | | Richard Johnston |
| 1695 | Henry Tenison (Note: Also elected for County Monaghan in 1695, for which he chose to sit.) | | Richard Johnston |
| 1696 | Sir Robert Staples, 4th Bt | | Richard Johnston |
| 1703 | Richard St George | | Henry St George |
| 1713 | Richard St George | | Thomas Ashe |
| 1723 | Richard St George | | James Coghill |
| 1727 | Sir Ralph Gore, 4th Bt | | Silvester Crosse |
| 1731 | Sir Ralph Gore, 4th Bt | | Walter Carey (Note: Also spelt 'Cary') |
| 1733 | Richard Vincent | | Walter Carey |
| 1757 | Richard Vincent | | Nehemiah Nixon Donnellan |
| 1761 | Sir Capel Molyneux, 3rd Bt | | Samuel Lowe |
| 1765 | Sir Capel Molyneux, 3rd Bt | | William Moore |
| 1768 | John Staples | | William Moore |
| 1776 | Sir Capel Molyneux, 3rd Bt | | Thomas St George |
| 1783 | Sackville Hamilton | | Thomas St George |
| 1785 | Sackville Hamilton | | John Francis Cradock |
| 1790 | Sackville Hamilton | | Richard Townsend Herbert |
| 1795 | Hon. Thomas Pelham | | Richard Townsend Herbert |
| January 1798 | Sir John Tydd, 1st Bt | | Thomas Burgh |
| 1798 | Jonah Barrington | Irish Patriot | Thomas Burgh |
| January 1800 | William Gardiner (Note: Declared not duly elected in 1800) | | Hon. Richard Annesley |
| March 1800 | John King | | Charles Ball |
| 1801 | Disenfranchised | | |

== Bibliography ==
- O'Hart, John (2007). The Irish and Anglo-Irish Landed Gentry: When Cromwell came to Ireland. Vol. II. Heritage Books. ISBN 0-7884-1927-7.
- Leigh Rayment's historical List of Members of the Irish House of Commons. Cites: Johnston-Liik, Edith Mary (2002). The History of the Irish Parliament 1692-1800 (6 volumes). Ulster Historical Foundation.
