= Corkagh Park =

Park in Dublin, Ireland

- Location within Dublin Location within Ireland
- Type: Municipal
- Location: Clondalkin, County Dublin, Ireland
- Coordinates: 53°18′35″N 6°24′53″W
- Area: 120 hectares (1.2 km^{2}; 0.46 sq mi)
- Operator: South Dublin County Council
- Status: November, December & January 10.00am -- 5.00pm February & March 10.00am -- 6.00pm April & October 10.00am -- 7.00pm May & September 10.00am -- 8.00pm June, July & August 10.00am -- 9.00pm

Corkagh Park (Irish: Páirc Chorcaí, from corcach, meaning "marsh") is a park situated in Clondalkin, County Dublin, Ireland, between the N7 and the Old Nangor Road. The River Camac flows through it, and within the grounds of the park there are fishing ponds. There is a caravan park near the park's N7 entrance. The area, once Corkagh Demesne, contained two large houses, and historically also featured mills.

== History ==
The park was formerly known as Corkagh Demesne, on which two large houses stood and gunpowder mills were run.

When Lewis Chaigneau bought Corkagh in the 1720s, he leased a portion of the estate to Nicholas Grueber for the establishment of gunpowder mills. Grueber ran the mills from 1716 to 1733. The gunpowder mills on Corkagh Estate, active during the 18th and 19th centuries, were an important centre for the production of gunpowder and provided employment for local people. Most of the mill buildings were situated in Kilmatead which adjoins Corkagh.

Explosions were common occurrences at gunpowder mills. Once such explosion, in 1787, was so big that it was felt as far away as Dublin city and caused damage to buildings around Clondalkin. The mill building itself was completely destroyed. The Arabin family ran the mills in the 1790s.

Corkagh Park was purchased in 1983 by Dublin County Council and, since 1994, South Dublin County Council have managed the park.

Notable residents and visitors of the Corkagh estate included Arthur Wolfe and Elizabeth Bowen.

== Recreation ==
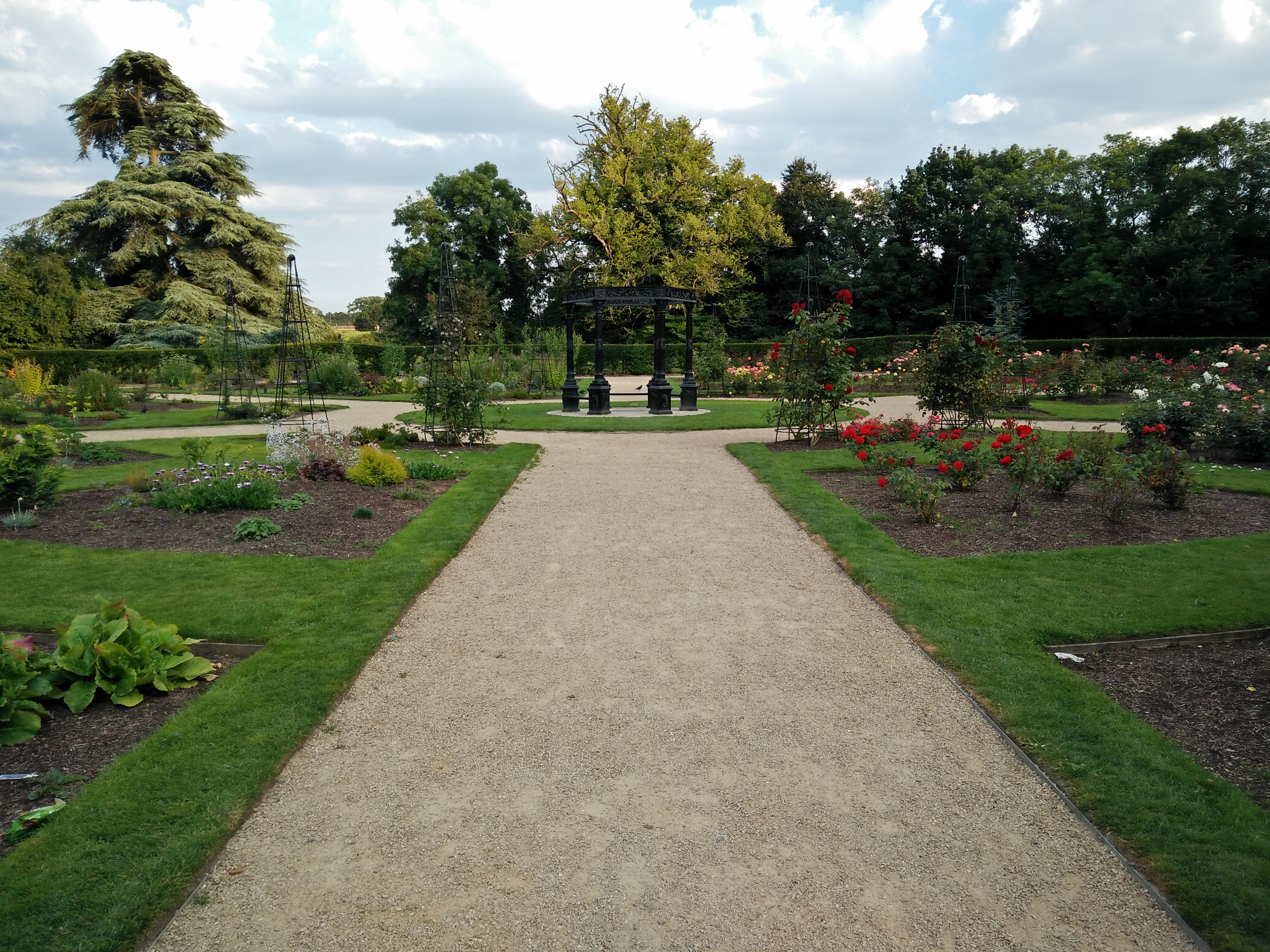
Rose garden in Corkagh Park

Ireland's only purpose-built cycle track is located in Corkagh Park. Criterium cycle races are sometimes held here during the summer.

The park's other recreational facilities include a playground and sports pitches. These include, unusually for Ireland, a baseball field.

== Environment ==
There are over 390 different species of plants and animals in Corkagh Park, with 20,000 trees planted in the early 1980s and 1990s. Tree specimens include Fraxinus (ash), Quercus (oak), Tilia (lime), Juglans (walnut), Cedrus (cedar), Fagus (beech), Aesculus (Chestnut) and Sequoiadendron. The Common frog and Pipistrelle Bat, protected species under the 1976 Wildlife Act, are both found in the park. Kestrels and other birds have nested in the park's trees. The hawfinch is an occasional winter visitor. The great spotted woodpecker, Ireland's newest breeding species, has also previously been seen here.
