= Granard (Parliament of Ireland constituency) =

Pre-1801 Irish constituency

- Former borough constituency for the Irish House of Commons
- County: County Longford
- Borough: Granard

1679–1801
- Seats: 2
- Replaced by: Disfranchised

Granard was a constituency represented in the Irish House of Commons until 1800.

== History ==
In the Patriot Parliament of 1689 summoned by James II, Granard was not represented.

== Members of Parliament, 1679–1801 ==
=== 1689–1801 ===
Election	First MP	Second MP
1689	Granard was not represented in the Patriot Parliament	
1692	John Perceval	Sir Walter Plunket
September 1703	John Perceval	Stephen Ludlow (Note: Also elected for Dunleer in 1703, for which he chose to sit)
1703	John Perceval	Wentworth Harman
1713	John Parnell	John Rogerson
1715	John Parnell	James Peppard
1723	Charles Coote	James Peppard
1725	Charles Coote	Robert Jocelyn
1727	James Macartney	John Folliott
1761	Edmond Malone	Robert Sibthorpe
1767	Gervase Parker Bushe	Robert Sibthorpe
1768	Gervase Parker Bushe	Anthony Malone (Note: Also elected for County Westmeath in 1768, for which he chose to sit.)
1769	Gervase Parker Bushe	Richard Malone
1776	Thomas Maunsell	John Kilpatrick
1780	Thomas Maunsell	William Long Kingsman
1783	Robert Jephson	George William Molyneux
1790	John Ormsby Vandeleur	Thomas Pakenham Vandeleur
January 1798	Hon. George Fulke Lyttelton	William Fulk Greville
1798	Hon. George Fulke Lyttelton	Ross Mahon
1800	Richard Townsend Herbert	Ross Mahon
1801	Constituency disenfranchised	

== Bibliography ==
- O'Hart, John (2007). The Irish and Anglo-Irish Landed Gentry: When Cromwell came to Ireland. Vol. II. Heritage Books. ISBN 978-0-7884-1927-0.
- Leigh Rayment's historical List of Members of the Irish House of Commons. Cites: Johnston-Liik, Edith Mary (2002). The History of the Irish Parliament 1692-1800 (6 volumes). Ulster Historical Foundation.
