= Jonah Barrington (judge) =

Irish lawyer, judge and politician

Sir Jonah Barrington, K.C. K.C.

Member of Parliament for Clogher
- In office 1798 – January 1800

Member of Parliament for Tuam
- In office 1790–1798

Personal details
- Born: 1756/7 Knapton, Abbeyleix, Queen's County, Ireland
- Died: 8 April 1834 (aged abt 77) Versailles, France
- Party: Patriot Party
- Education: Trinity College Dublin

Military service
- Branch/service: Irish Volunteers

Sir Jonah Barrington, K.C. (1756/57 – 8 April 1834), was an Irish lawyer, judge and politician. Jonah Barrington is most notable for his amusing and popular memoirs of life in late 18th-century Ireland; for his opposition to the Act of Union in 1800; and for his removal from the judiciary by both Houses of Parliament in 1830, still a unique event.

== Barrington family ==
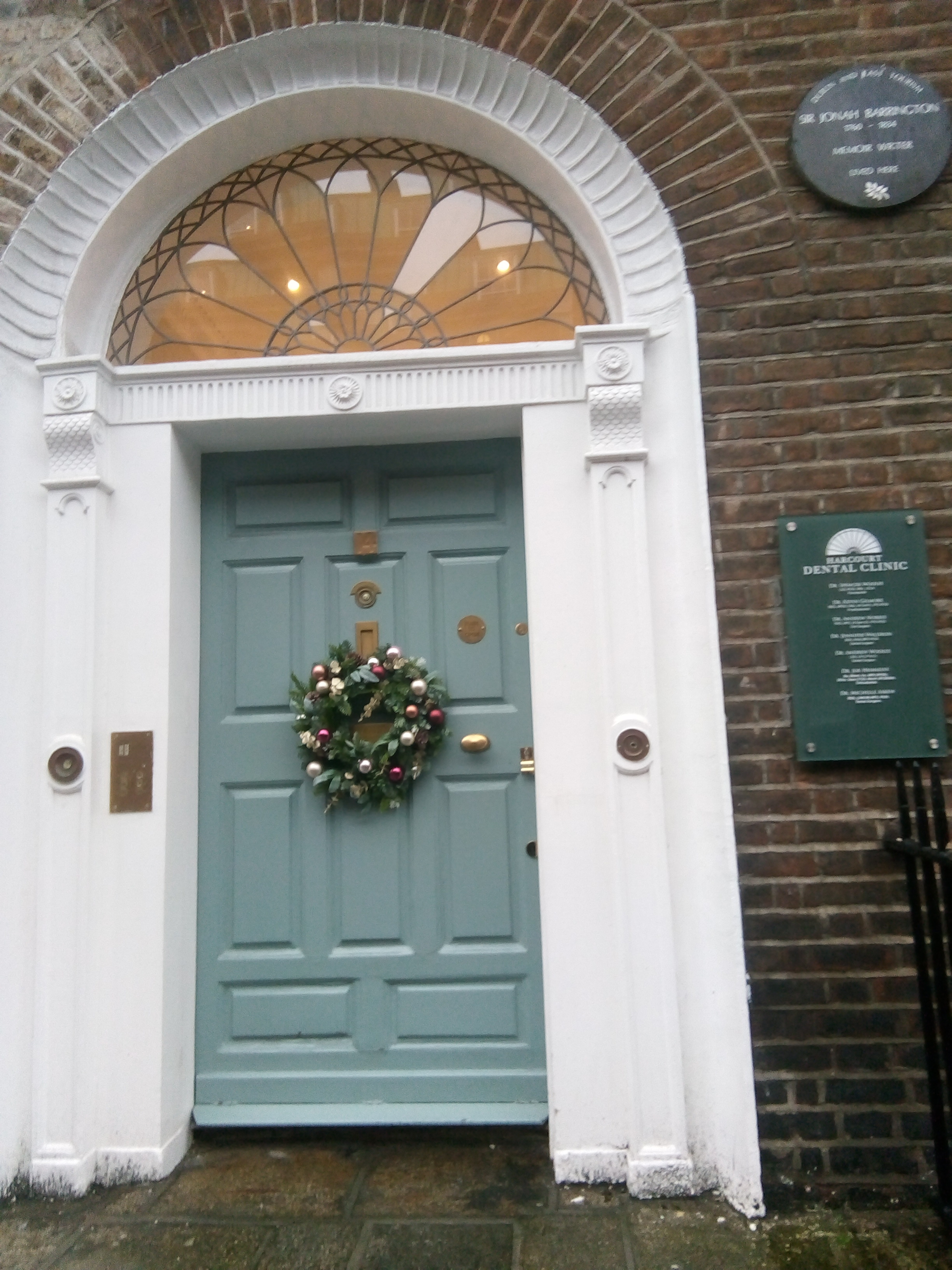
Barrington's former home, 14 Harcourt Street, Dublin. The plaque gives his birth year as 1760.

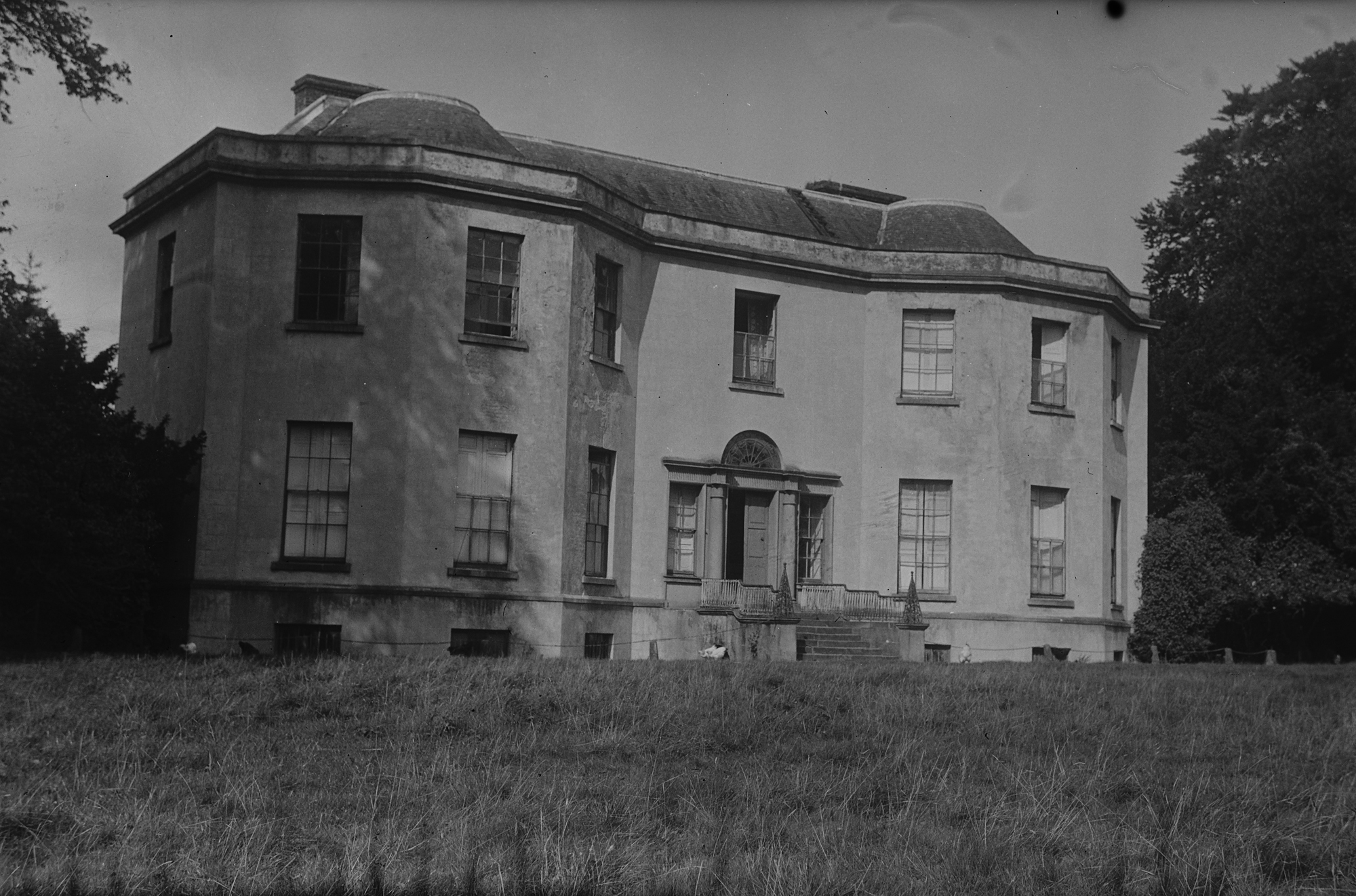
Knapton House at Abbeyleix, County Laois in 1942-44

Barrington was the third son, one of thirteen or sixteen children; six at least, and probably seven, were sons; of John Barrington, an impoverished Protestant gentleman landowner in County Laois and his wife Sibella French of Peterswell, County Galway. He was raised and schooled by his grandparents in Dublin and entered Trinity College Dublin in 1773, aged 16 but he left Trinity College without a degree.

He joined the Irish Volunteers and supported the Irish Patriots in the early 1780s. His father raised and commanded two Corps; the Cullenagh Rangers and the Ballyroan Light Infantry. Barrington's elder brother commanded both the Kilkenny Horse and the Durrow Light Dragoons. Through his correspondence with General Hunt Walsh, Barrington's father secured him a commission in Walsh's regiment. Upon learning that the regiment was to be sent to America to fight in the ongoing conflict, and fearful of dying on some foreign battlefield, Barrington wrote to Walsh asking him to present the commission to another candidate instead, claiming that he himself was too tender to be of any real use. Barrington's fears proved well founded when his replacement, the only child of one of Walsh's friends, was killed in his first engagement.

== Career ==
=== Law and Parliament ===
He was called to the Irish bar in 1788 and in 1789 he married Catherine, daughter of Dublin mercer, Edward Grogan. They were to have seven children. The following year he entered by the purchase of the seat the pre-1801 Parliament of Ireland as MP for Tuam. He accepted a sinecure post in 1793 at the Dublin customhouse worth £1,000 p.a. generally supporting Henry Grattan and he took silk the same year. Barrington was a member of the Kildare Street Club in Dublin. Appointed an Admiralty court judge in 1798 he re-entered parliament the same year as member for Clogher and voted against the Act of Union in 1799–1800, rejecting Lord Clare's offer of the solicitor-generalship in 1799. In 1802 he unsuccessfully contested a seat for Dublin in the UK parliament.

=== Political legacy ===
Barrington's comments on the Act of Union had a continuing resonance with the Young Ireland, Fenian and Irish Parliamentary Party movements, which hoped to re-establish "Grattan's Parliament" in some way. In particular, his Rise and Fall of the Irish Nation (1833) provided the basis for this romantic idealisation of Grattan's Parliament adopted by the Irish Parliamentary Party from the 1880s.

=== Admiralty Court ===
Appointed an Admiralty court judge in 1798 at a salary of £500 he found there was little work to be done and his lack of a degree restricted other opportunities to support extravagant tastes. His award of a knighthood in 1807 brought no increased income. His court ordered the sale of two derelict vessels and he gave instructions that the proceeds were to go to his own bank account. In 1810 or 1811 he took his wife and family to England and from that time on his work in Ireland was carried out by surrogates. Still retaining his judgeship and salary he moved to France in 1814 to escape his creditors and never returned to Ireland.

=== Bankruptcy and loss of office ===
In 1828, commissioners learnt of his financial irregularities. Barrington crossed the channel to London and protested that he was innocent but would not answer the charges based on the documentary evidence produced by the commissioners. In 1830, a parliamentary commission recommended that he be removed from office, finding misappropriations of court funds in 1805, 1806 and 1810. Pursuant to a provision (Note: Judges' commissions are valid (during good behaviour) and if they do not behave themselves, they can be removed . . . This provision was the result of various monarchs influencing judges' decisions, and its purpose was to assure judicial independence.) of the Act of Settlement of 1701, which sought to protect the independence of the judiciary, both Houses of the Parliament of the United Kingdom voted for an Address to King William IV praying for his removal, and the King duly dismissed Barrington from office. By then, Barrington's first 1827 volume of memoirs had sold successfully, and they were republished and expanded (see below).

Barrington was the first judge removed from office under the Act of Settlement, and to this day, is the only judge in the United Kingdom to be so removed.

== Duel with Richard Daly ==
According to one of his sometimes spurious personal memoirs, on 20 March 1780. Barrington travelled to Donnybrook to duel with Richard Daly.

Daly had fought 16 duels in three years - three with swords and thirteen with pistols. Remarkably, he, and his opponents, had always escaped serious injury. Barrington had no pistols so he and his second, Richard Crosbie, had spent the previous night constructing a pair 'from old locks, stocks and barrels'. At Donnybrook, Daly's second, Jack Patterson, a nephew of the Chief Justice, approached Crosbie, explained that it was all a mistake and asked that the two shake hands. Barrington was in favour, but Crosbie would have none of it. Taking out a duelling handbook, he pointed to rule No.7 - 'No apology can be received after the parties meet, without a fire.'

Taking up their positions Barrington lost no time in pressing the trigger and Daly staggered back, put his hand to his chest, and cried "I'm hit, Sir." The ball had not penetrated but had driven part of a brooch slightly into his breastbone. Barrington only then thought to inquire why the duel was even taking place. This time the rule book noted: "If a party challenged accepts the challenge without asking the reason for it, the challenger is never bound to divulge it afterwards".

== Memoirs ==
Barrington is most notable today for his memoirs which included scathing but humorous thumbnail portraits of contemporary Irish lawyers, judges and politicians during the last years of the Protestant Ascendancy. Personal sketches also includes vignettes on Irish people from every background. His works were reprinted with frequent additions and renamings as:

- Historic Anecdotes and Secret Memoirs of the Legislative Union between Great Britain and Ireland (London: G. Robinson 1809);

republished with a 2nd volume as: Historic Memoirs, Comprising Secret Records of the National Convention, the Rebellion, and the Union, with Delineations of the Principal Characters Connected with These Transactions, 2 vols. (London: R. Bentley & H. Colburn 1833 [1809–33])

3rd edn: ..with memoir of the author, an essay on Irish wit and humour, and notes and corrections by Townsend Young; 2 vols. (London: G. Routledge & Sons 1869)

4th edn. in 2 vols, (Glasgow & London: Cameron & Ferguson 1876);

- Personal Sketches of his Own Times (3 vols. 1827–32): Vols. 1 & 2 (London: Henry Colburn 1827); Vol. 3 (London: Henry Colburn & R. Bentley 1832)

reissued as (George Birmingham, intro.): Recollections of Jonah Barrington (Dublin: Talbot; London: T. Fisher Unwin 1918);

- Historic Memoirs of Ireland, 2 vols. (London: R. Bentley & H. Colburn 1833)
- The Rise and Fall of the Irish Nation (Paris: G. G. Bennis 1833)

2nd edn. (Dublin: James Duffy 1853)

== Criticism and literary resonance ==
Since his death Barrington's work has been quoted by a wide selection of editors, primarily following two themes; the political drama surrounding the Act of Union and the colourful nature of life in 1700s Ireland.

- Frank O'Connor, ed., Book of Ireland (London: Fontana 1959 & edns.), was impressed by: "Merry Christmas, 1778" uninterrupted match of hard-going till the weather should break up ... hogshead of superior claret’ ... ‘the pipers plied their chants ... I shall never forget the attraction this novelty had for my youthful mind (p. 139); Sir Boyle Roche ... the most celebrated and entertaining anti-grammarian in the Irish Parliament (p. 183); on duelling Ough, thunder! ... how many holes did the villain want drilled in to his carcass? (p. 262); Crow Street theatre: immediately ... on being struck, he reeled, staggered, and fell very naturally, considering that it was his first death (p. 278).
- Roy Foster: the racy Personal Sketches...confirmed him as the chief historian of the "half-mounted gentlemen" of Ireland.
- W. B. Yeats: Mrs French, in the first section of Yeats's poem The Tower, is a character from Barrington's Recollections, where it is used to illustrate mutual attachment between the Irish peasantry and their landlords.
- James Joyce: Tom Kernan makes reference to Barrington's Reminiscences (recte Recollections) in Ulysses: Must ask Ned Lambert to lend me those reminiscences of sir Jonah Barrington.
- John Mitchel quoted Barrington in his History of Ireland, concerning the approach to the 1798 rebellion: Mr Pitt counted on the expertness of the Irish Government to effect a premature explosion. Free quarters were now ordered, to irritate the Irish population; slow tortures were inflicted, under the pretence of forcing confessions; the people were goaded and driven to madness (p. 264).
- A Dictionary of Irish Writers (1985), ed. Brian Cleeve & Ann Brady, lists his Historic Anecdotes and Secret Memoirs of the Legislative Union between Great Britain and Ireland (1809).
- A book of selections was published for the American market in 1967.

== See also ==
- Ireland 1691–1801
