= William St Julien Arabin =

British lawyer and judge (1773–1841)

Judge-Advocate-General of the Army
- In office 6 November 1838 – 21 February 1839
- Preceded by: Robert Cutlar Fergusson
- Succeeded by: Sir George Grey, Bt

Personal details
- Born: 1775
- Died: 15 December 1841 (aged 67–68) High Beech, Waltham Abbey
- Spouse: Mary Meux (after 1802)
- Children: Richard Arabin
- Parent(s): William John Arabin
- Education: St Paul's School, London
- Alma mater: Corpus Christi College, Cambridge

William St Julien Arabin (1773 – 15 December 1841) was a British lawyer and judge who served as the Judge-Advocate-General of the Army for a three-and-a-half-month period (6 November 1838 – 21 February 1839).

== Early life ==
Arabin was born abroad, one of many sons of Henrietta Molyneux and her husband and Gen. William John Arabin (originally from Dublin), who left him significant estates in Essex and Middlesex. His father divorced his mother in 1786 following her affair with Thomas Sutton of Moulsey.

He was descended from one of the oldest families in Provence. His Huguenot ancestor Bartholomew d'Arabin fled to Holland after the revocation of the edict of Nantes in 1685, and came over to England with King William III in 1688. His maternal grandparents were Sir Capel Molyneux, 3rd Baronet and the former Elizabeth East (sister of Sir William East, 1st Baronet).

Arabin attended St Paul's School, London and then studied Law at Corpus Christi College, Cambridge. He was admitted to Inner Temple in 1793, and was called to the bar in 1801. He was appointed serjeant-at-law in 1824.

== Career ==
He was Deputy Recorder of the City of London. He served as Judge-Advocate-General of the Army 1838–39. He was a judge of the Central Criminal Court and of Sheriffs' Court, London. He was a Verderer of the forests of Epping and Hainault.

As a judge, Arabin was known as an eccentric figure who was notorious for his confused pronouncements. Some of his most famous quotes include:

- Prisoner, God has given you good abilities, instead of which you go about the country stealing ducks.
- If there ever was a case of clearer evidence than this of persons acting together, this case is that case... and
- They will steal the very teeth out of your mouth as you walk through the streets [of Uxbridge] — I know it from experience...

== Personal life ==
On 12 October 1803, Arabin married Mary Meux in Camden. She was a daughter of brewer Richard Meux and Mary (née Brougham) Meux and sister to Sir Henry Meux, 1st Baronet. A sister, Fanny Meux, was the wife of Vicesimus Knox. Together, William and Mary were the parents of:

- Richard Arabin (1812–1865), who married his first cousin, Elizabeth Mary Meux (1819–1880), a daughter of Sir Henry Meux, 1st Baronet, in 1839.

He died at Arabin House in High Beech, Waltham Abbey, Essex, in 1841.

=== Descendants ===
Through his son Richard Arabin (1811-1865), he was a grandfather of William St Julien Arabin (1842-1907), Alice Charlotte Arabin (wife of Hon. Arthur Charles Lewin Cadogan, a son of Henry Cadogan, 4th Earl Cadogan), and Marianne Elizabeth Arabin (wife of John William Gordon Woodford, son of Sir Alexander George Woodford).

== See also ==
- Arabin surname
