= John Cradock =

English churchman

The Right Reverend and Right Honourable John Cradock PC (Ire), D.D.
- Archbishop of Dublin; Bishop of Glendalough; Primate of Ireland
- Church: Church of Ireland
- Diocese: Dublin and Glendalough
- Appointed: 5 March 1772
- In office: 1772–1778
- Predecessor: Arthur Smyth
- Successor: Robert Fowler
- Previous post: Bishop of Kilmore (1757-1772)

Orders
- Consecration: 4 December 1757 by Charles Cobbe

Personal details
- Born: 1708 Donington, Shropshire, England
- Died: 10 December 1778 (aged 69–70) Dublin, County Dublin, Ireland
- Buried: St Patrick's Cathedral, Dublin
- Denomination: Anglican
- Spouse: Mary Blaydwin
- Children: John Cradock
- Education: St John's College, Cambridge

John Cradock (alias Craddock) (c. 1708 - 10 December 1778) was an English churchman, Church of Ireland Archbishop of Dublin from 1772.

== Background and education ==
Born at Donington, Shropshire, England about 1708, he was the eldest son of the Reverend William Cradock, Principal Official, Prebendary, Sacrist, Lecturer & Reader of the Collegiate Church of Wolverhampton and also Rectory of Donington. Cradock's brother was the Reverend Thomas Cradock (1717–1757), Clerk, A.M. Principal Official, Prebendary, Sacrist, Lecturer & Reader of the Collegiate Church of Wolverhampton and also Vicar of Penn. Having received his education at St John's College, Cambridge, where he graduated B.A. in 1728, Cradock was elected to a fellowship of his college, which he held with the rectory of Dry Drayton, Cambridgeshire. The degree of B.D. was conferred on him in 1740, and that of D.D. in 1749.

== Career ==
He became rector of St Paul's, Covent Garden, London, and chaplain to John Russell, 4th Duke of Bedford, on whose estate he was born and whose patronage helped him to the rectorship. Cradock's portrait appears in a painting by William Hogarth entitled "A View of Covent Garden Market". Accompanying the Duke of Bedford to Ireland on his appointment to the office of lord-lieutenant, he was soon after promoted, on 11 November 1757, to the bishopric of Kilmore; and having held that see for fourteen years, he was translated to the archbishopric of Dublin, by patent dated 5 March 1772. In 1777 he was attacked by Patrick Duigenan in his Lachrymae Academicae, who censured Cradock as Visitor of Trinity College, Dublin, for having spoken favourably of Provost John Hely-Hutchinson.

Bishop Cradock seems to have been a helpful man even to Roman Catholics, if we are to believe the testimony of Major Edward Magauran who visited the bishop in the Spring of 1767 ("Memoirs of Major M’Gauran", Volume I, Page 134, London 1786). The major was born in Ballymagovern, County Cavan on 16 April 1746, the grandson of Colonel Bryan Magauran, the Chief of the Clan McGovern who fought in the Battle of the Boyne for King James II against William III of Orange. At the time of his visit to the bishop, Edward M’Gauran was then serving as an ensign in General Loudon’s Austrian Regiment of Foot. He needed his pedigree proved by a respectable witness in Ireland and he states as follows; "My relations being numerous, and dispersed throughout the kingdom, I was several months employed in collecting their attestations, which I found was necessary to have corroborated by the testimony of Dr. Reilly, the Titular Bishop of Kilmore, who was then absent: I applied to Dr. M’Guire, the Catholic Bishop of Dromore, then at the house of Mr. Robert M’Guire of Tempo; He refused to grant me my request, although he knew my pretensions to be just. Exasperated by his duplicity, which was injurious to my purpose and his tenets, I set off, and travelling all night, arrived the next morning at Kilmore, the seat of Dr. Craddock, the Protestant Bishop, who signed my certificate, which was followed by the dignified clergy, and the nobility of the neighbourhood, which I thought an ample indemnification for my recent disappointment".

== Personal life ==
Dr. Cradock died at his palace of St. Sepulchre's, in the city of Dublin, 10 December 1778, and was buried in the southern aisle of St. Patrick's, but there is not any inscription to his memory. His only son was John Francis Cradock; his widow, Mary Cradock, died 15 December 1819, aged 89, and was buried in the Abbey Church, Bath.

== Notes ==
Church of Ireland titles
Preceded by Arthur Smyth	Archbishop of Dublin; 1772–1778	Succeeded by Robert Fowler
