= Sir John Tydd, 1st Baronet =

Irish politician and landowner

Sir John Tydd, 1st Baronet, of Lamberton, Queen's County (c.1740 – December 1803) was an Irish politician, landowner and baronet.

== Biography ==
He was the eldest son of French Tydd of County Laois and his wife Elizabeth Moore, daughter of Pierce Moore of Loran and Cremorgan, near Timahoe in the same county. Both families were long-established landowners. Arthur Moore MP (1765-1846), Serjeant-at-law (Ireland) and judge of the Court of Common Pleas (Ireland), was his cousin and heir.

Tydd was educated at Trinity College, Dublin, where he took his degree in 1764. He was called to the Bar in 1772, but did not practice. He travelled on the Continent as a young man, then entered politics: Henry Grattan was a friend and political ally of Tydd, as was Sir John Parnell, 2nd Baronet. He first entered the Irish House of Commons in 1778 as the member for Maryborough. His career was unusual, though not unique, in the number of constituencies he represented: he changed his seat to Ardfert in 1783, then to Ballinakill, then Clogher, and finally Fore. He retired from politics on the passage of the Act of Union 1801, which he opposed but did not vote against.

He was clearly seen as a safe "Government man", and he was created a baronet in 1795 as a reward for his political loyalty. In the 1790s he held the lucrative office of Paymaster of the Corn Premiums, which was described as a Government "place", i.e. a sinecure, at a salary of £800 a year. He was Escheator of Leinster in 1798-9; the office was another sinecure.

Apart from politics, his main interest in later life was improving Lamberton Park, near Portlaoise. He bought the house and estate about 1790, and he was said to love Lamberton more than any place on earth. His improvements to the Lamberton estate, which included laying out a deer park and extensive tree planting, were much admired by visitors: it was described in 1801 as "altogether the neatest and best laid down demesne in the County".

He married in 1772 Diana Bunbury, daughter and co-heiress with her sister Elizabeth (Richardson) of Benjamin Bunbury of Kilfeacle, County Tipperary; her mother was Mary Kelly of Maryborough. They had no children, and, Tydd's brother having predeceased him, Lamberton passed on Sir John's death to Arthur Moore, his closest male relative on the mother's side, while the baronetcy became extinct. After a long period of failing health, Sir John died at the end of 1803, having made his last will on Christmas Eve. He was buried in St. Ann's Church, Dawson Street, Dublin. Diana continued to live at Lamberton for some years, but after a major burglary in 1806 which might easily have turned violent, she moved to Bath, where she died in 1821.

== Sources ==
- Annual Register 1821
- Cokayne, George Edward Complete Baronetage Exeter William Pollard and Co. 1906 Volume 5
- Coote, Sir Charles General View of the Agriculture and Manufactures of Queen's County Dublin Society 1801
- Grattan, Henry junior Memoirs of the Life and Times of Henry Grattan, by his son London Henry Colburn and Co 1842
- UK National Archives Will of Sir John Tydd of Lamberton, Queen's County 24 December 1803
