= Aghnasurn =

Aughnasurn
- Location within Ireland
- Coordinates: 54.023172°N 8.253748°W
- Country: Ireland
- County: County Roscommon
- Civil Parish: Kilbryan

Area
  - Total: 28.26 ha (69.8 acres)

Aughnasurn, or Aghnasurn is a townland in the civil parish of Kilbryan, County Roscommon, Ireland.

== Location ==
Aghnasurn is in the civil parish of Kilbryan in the Barony of Boyne, County Roscommon. Aghnasurn is in the Electoral Division of Kilbryan. It has an area of 69.83 acres (28.26 ha). Adjoining townlands are Annagh to the south, Bodorragha to the east, Derreenagan to the north and Largan to the west.

== Historical ==
Holy Trinity Abbey, founded around 1220 on an island in Lough Key and abandoned in 1606–07, owned property at Aghnasurn and Estersnow. Around 1750–1780 the village was part of Lord Crofton's Estate in County Roscommon. A map of George Crofton's estate dated 24 April 1778 showed property at Aghnasurn.

Aughnasurn was listed in 1839 among the locations of Irish loan societies associated with the Irish Reproductive Loan Fund Institution in the provinces of Munster and Connacht. Other societies in Roscommon were at Castlerea, Fuerty, Elphin, Ballymoe and Dunamon, Knockadoe, Knockgrohery, Kiltoom, Frenchpark, Cappagh, Kilmore, Athlone, Strokestown, Mount-Talbot and Aughram.

A report from the Reverend Dominick Noon on the Parishes of Aughana and Aughnasurn was read in a British parliamentary debate on 23 November 1848. He stated that in the parish of Aughana 67 had died of fever and 137 of famine. 230 had emigrated and 862 were in a state of starvation. In the village of Aughnasurn 76 had died of famine since October.

An 1845 history of Ireland said that Lord Lorton was the proprietor of the entire parish of Kill-bryan apart from Kilteeshan. The townland of Aghnasurn had a meal, flour, and tuck mill. Griffith's Valuation published in 1858 lists eight households in Aghnasurn: Frazer, Dolan, Mcdermott, Fallon, Mcdermottroe, Cassidy, Frazer and Haley. The 1911 Census had 21 people in the townland: Dolan (3), Cassidy (4), MacDermott (4), O'Hara (1), Fallon (7) and McDermottroe (2).

== Sources ==
- "Aghnasurn Townland, Co. Roscommon", Townlands.ie
- "Aghnasurn", logainm.ie
- Clyne, Miriam (2005), "Archaeological Excavations at Holy Trinity Abbey Lough Key, Co. Roscommon", Proceedings of the Royal Irish Academy: Archaeology, Culture, History, Literature, 105C (2), Royal Irish Academy: 23–98, doi:10.3318/PRIC.2005.105.1.23, JSTOR 25506230
- D'Alton, John (1845), The History of Ireland: From the Earliest Period to the Year 1245, when the Annals of Boyle, which are Adopted and Embodied as the Running Text Authority, Terminate: with a Brief Essay on the Native Annalists, and Other Sources for Illustrating Ireland, and Full Statistical and Historical Notices of the Barony of Boyle, author
- Griffith, Richard John (1 July 1858), Aghnasurn, Roscommon
- Martin, Robert Montgomery (1848), Ireland Before and After the Union with Great Britain, Nichols
- O'Connell, John (1848), "Address if answer to the speech", Hansard's Parliamentary Debates, Hansard for Great Britain. Parliament
- Rental of Lord Crofton's Estate in County Roscommon, circa 1750-1780, National Library of Ireland
- Roscommon Aghnasurn, National Archives of Ireland
