= Conyers Clifford =

16th-century English politician and military officer

Sir Conyers Clifford
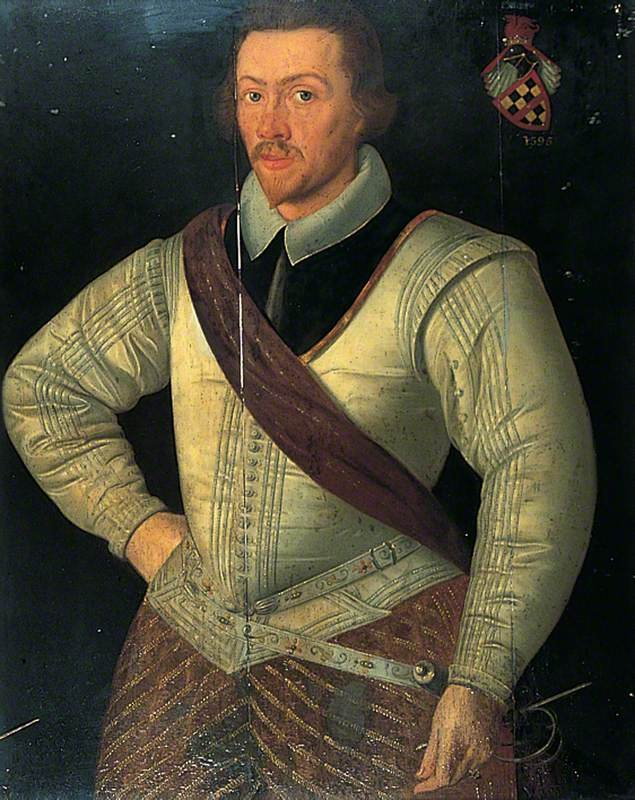
- 16th-century portrait by unknown artist

Lord President of Connaught
- In office 4 September 1597 – 15 August 1599
- Monarch: Elizabeth I
- Preceded by: Richard Bingham
- Succeeded by: Richard Burke

Member of Parliament for Pembroke
- In office 18 February 1593 – 10 April 1593
- Preceded by: Nicholas Adams
- Succeeded by: Edward Burton

Personal details
- Born: 1566 Kent, England
- Died: 15 August 1599 (aged 32–33) Curlew Pass, County Roscommon, Ireland
- Resting place: Holy Trinity Abbey, Lough Key, County Roscommon
- Spouse: Mary Southwell (d. 1603)
- Children: Conyers Clifford; Henry Clifford; Frances Clifford
- Education: University of Cambridge

Military service
- Allegiance: England
- Branch/service: English Army
- Years of service: 1591–1599
- Rank: Sergeant major general
- Battles/wars: Eighty Years' War • Siege of Rouen; Anglo-Spanish War • Capture of Cádiz; Nine Years' War • Battle of Curlew Pass

Sir Conyers Clifford (c. 1566 – 15 August 1599) was an English politician and military commander.

== Family background ==
He was the eldest (or third) son of George Clifford, esq., of Bobbing Court in Kent, by his wife Ursula, daughter of Roger Finch. His elder brother, Henry Clifford, Esq., alienated the manor of Bobbing to Conyers. He also had a brother, Nicholas.

== Career ==
Conyers Clifford served in the army sent under Robert Devereux, 2nd Earl of Essex to the siege of Rouen in 1591, being then a captain. He and John Wotton especially distinguished themselves in rescuing from the enemy the dead body of the earl's brother, Walter Devereux, who had fallen into an ambush during a demonstration before Rouen. In the same year, Clifford was knighted. He represented the borough of Pembroke in the parliament which met on 19 February 1593. At the bachelors' commencement in 1595 the University of Cambridge conferred on him the degree of M.A.

On the news being received of the siege of Calais by the Spanish, the Earl of Essex pushed to Dover; he wrote to Sir Anthony Shirley (3 April 1596) that he had sent Clifford to see whether he could ascertain the state of the town. Later in the same year, Clifford accompanied the expedition against Cádiz, in the capacity of serjeant-major of the troops. He was one of the officers who formed the council. The declared value of his share of the plunder was £3,256.

By letters patent dated 4 September 1597, he was appointed President of Connaught in Ireland, with the command and conduct of forty horsemen and a band of footmen. For some months previously he had acted as chief commissioner of the province, and constable of Athlone Castle. During his Irish campaign of 1599, the Earl of Essex proposed to march northward and divide the forces of Hugh Ó Neill, 2nd Earl of Tyrone, to which end he directed Clifford to penetrate from Connaught into Ulster and create a diversion. Clifford's force consisted of fifteen hundred foot and a hundred horse.

In August 1599, on coming to the Curlew Mountains, near Boyle, County Roscommon the baggage and ammunition were halted under the protection of the horse, while the infantry attempted the passage. The Irish under Brian Óg O'Rourke had blockaded the passage and began their assault on Clifford's men. The Battle of Curlew Pass ensued and the English, having nearly exhausted their ammunition, were seized with a panic and took flight. With the assistance of Hugh Roe O'Donnell's men, O'Rourke decisively defeated the English at Curlew Pass, and Clifford was left mortally wounded after being struck through the body with a pike. O'Donnell ordered O'Rourke to cut off Clifford's head and send it to the besieged O'Connors of Sligo as a sign that no English aid was coming. Upon receiving the head, they surrendered. Clifford's body was honourably buried at Holy Trinity Abbey, Lough Key and his "tragic death….was much lamented" by the Irish lords, as the man had "never told them a falsehood".

Clifford left in manuscript A brief Declaration relating to the Province of Connaught, how it stood in 1597.

== Family ==
In 1603, Clifford married Mary, daughter of Francis Southwell of Wymondham Hall, Norfolk, and widow successively of Thomas Sydney of Kent and Nicholas Gorge. By her, he had issue two sons, Henry and Conyers, and a daughter, Frances, who died young. His wife survived him, and married as her fourth husband, Sir Anthony St Leger, knight, Master of the Rolls in Ireland. She died in childbirth on 19 December 1603, aged thirty-seven, leaving a son, Anthony, and a daughter, also Frances, by St Leger; Frances outlived her mother by only a few days. Mary is buried in St. Patrick's Cathedral, Dublin.
