= Holy Trinity Abbey, Lough Key =

Holy Trinity Abbey
- Mainistir na Tríonóide
- Arms of the Order of Canons Regular of Prémontré

- Location within Ireland
- Interactive map of Holy Trinity Abbey

Monastery information
- Other name: Lough Key Abbey
- Order: Order of Canons Regular of Prémontré (Premonstratensians)
- Established: 1215
- Disestablished: 1608
- Mother house: Prémontré Abbey, Picardy
- Diocese: Elphin

People
- Founder: Clarus Mag Máilin

Architecture
- Status: inactive
- Style: Norman

Site
- Location: Trinity Island, Lough Key, County Roscommon
- Coordinates: 53.989217°N 8.254697°W
- Public access: yes

Holy Trinity Abbey is a former medieval Premonstratensian priory and National Monument in Lough Key, a lake in County Roscommon, Ireland.

== Location ==
Holy Trinity Abbey is located on Trinity Island, an island of 0.9 hectares (2.2 acres) in the southern part of Lough Key, facing Rockingham House.

== History ==
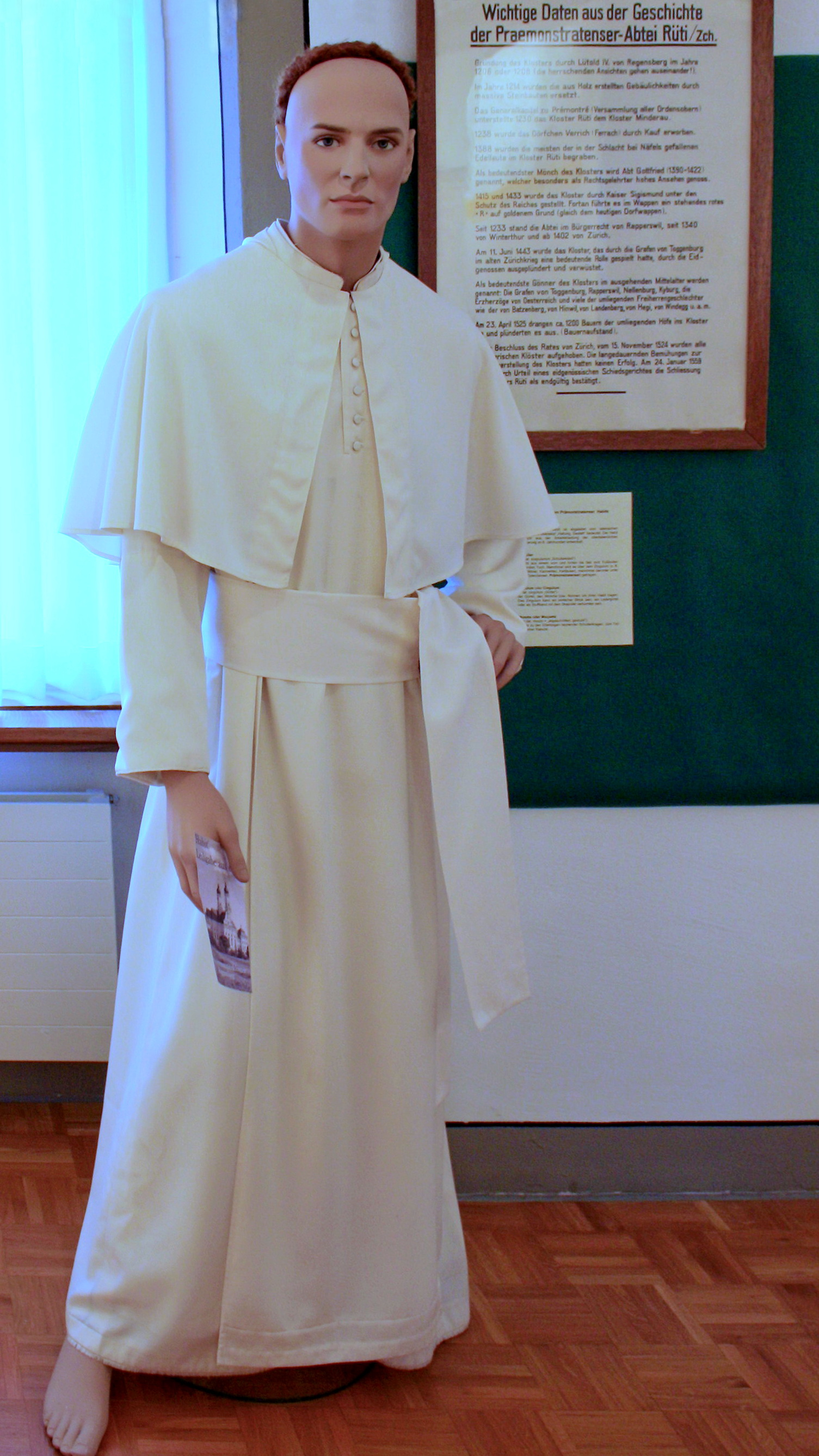
The Premonstratensians wore white habits (as on mannequin pictured) and were known as "White Canons."

A monastic site existed on the island from the 7th century AD, and a gable and church doorway of the 9th century survive. Holy Trinity Priory was founded in 1215 by Clarus Mag Máilin, archdeacon of Elphin, the island being gifted by Cathal O'Reilly, king of East Bréifne. Some monks came here from Boyle Abbey in 1228. It was raised to abbey status c. 1235. The standard claustral plan was envisaged but only the east range was actually built.

It acquired a daughter house on Lough Oughter, County Cavan in 1237.

The religious and lay brothers were buried within the abbey and in two cemeteries on the island. In 1436 the anchoress Gormfhlaith died here. Excavation suggests that the building to the north of the church was rebuilt after burning down in the 15th century, and this is confirmed by an annal entry in 1466 which blamed a fire on "the negligence of a woman." The Annals of Loch Cé, covering events between 1014 and 1590, were written here.

Holy Trinity Abbey was held in commendam by Ruaidri mac Diarmata (Rory MacDermot, King of Moylurg) from 1548 and granted to a Robert Harrison in 1594. Sir Conyers Clifford was buried there in 1599. The abbey owned property at Aghnasurn and Estersnow. The last monks left in 1608 when King James I confiscated the monastery.

One tomb on the island is of Úna Bhán MacDermot ("Fair Úna"). She was daughter of Brian Óg MacDermot (king of Moylurg 1603–36) who refused to let her to marry Tomás Láidir Costello ("Strong Thomas"), the son of one of his enemies. She died of a broken heart, and Tomás is said to have swum across to weep at her grave. Later he died too, and was buried next to Úna.

A 1991 excavation found silver coins of Henry VIII and Elizabeth I, bronze ferrule, iron knife and nails, pottery and rotary quern fragments.

== Buildings ==
The Abbey was constructed from the local rocks: pale grey sandstone and limestone.

The church contained sedilia and chapter room.
