= Inchmacnerin Abbey =

Irish former monastery

- Inis Mac nEirinn
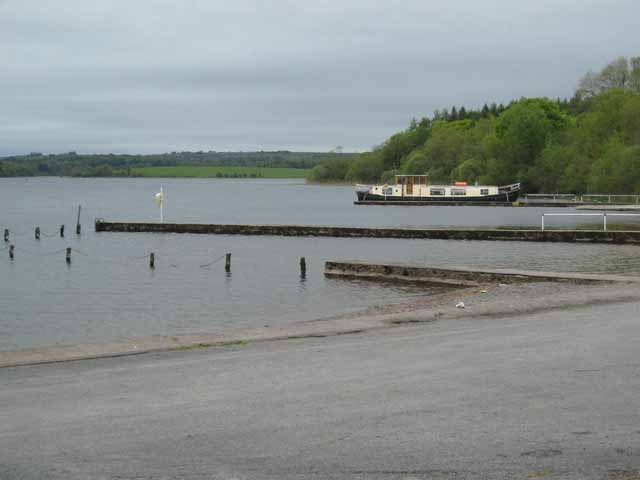
- Jetties at Tawnytaskin, looking towards Church Island

- Location within Ireland
- Interactive map of Inchmacnerin Abbey

Monastery information
- Other names: Eas-mac-neire; Inis-mac-n-erin; Insula-Macnery; Insula-Machum; Inch-vicrinni
- Order: Canons Regular (Augustinians)
- Established: 6th century
- Disestablished: before 1596
- Mother house: Arrouaise Abbey
- Diocese: Elphin

People
- Founder: Columba

Architecture
- Status: inactive
- Style: Norman

Site
- Location: Church Island, Lough Key, County Roscommon
- Coordinates: 53.994501°N 8.260823°W
- Public access: yes

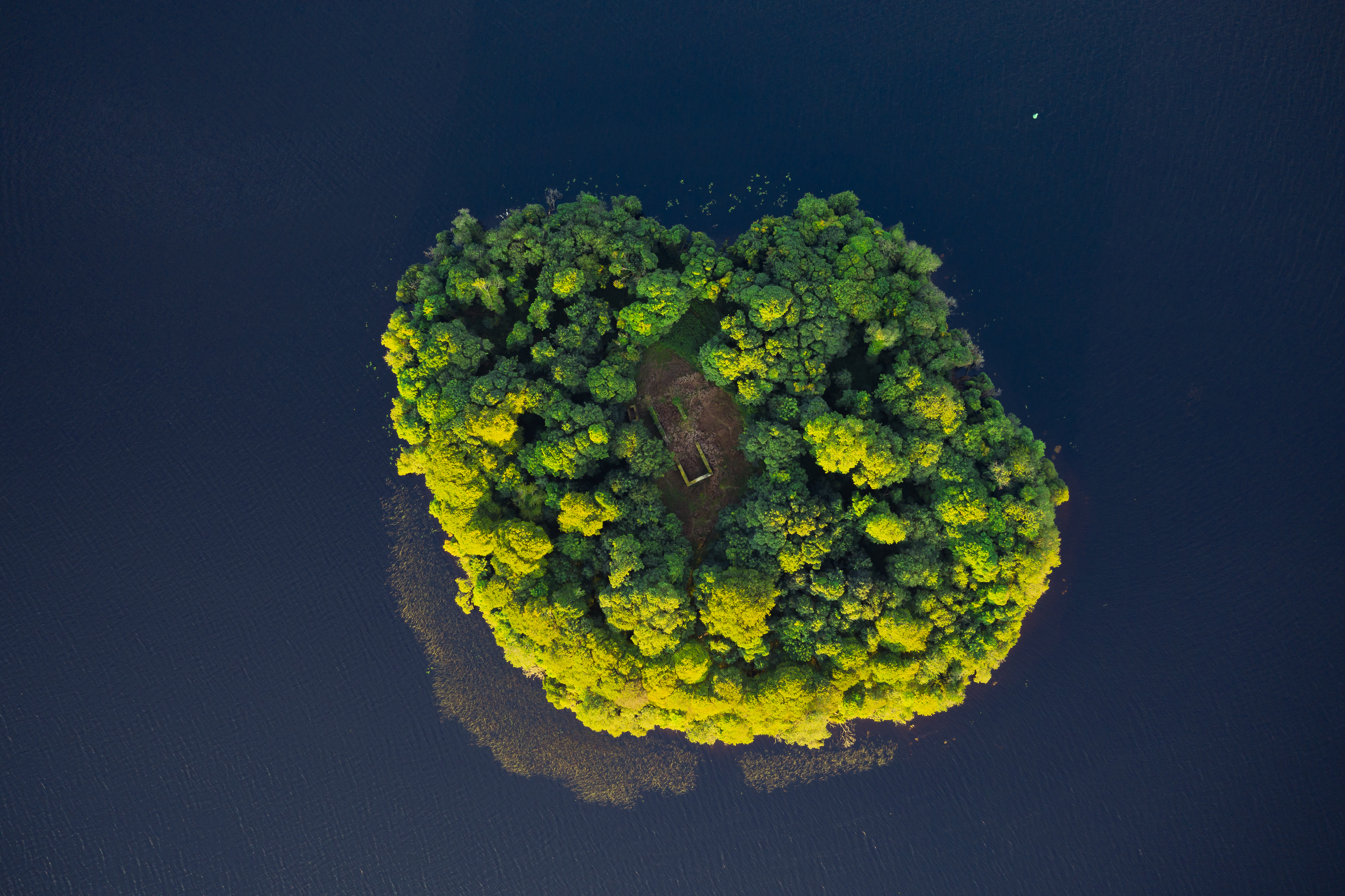
Inchmacnerin Abbey aerial view

Inchmacnerin Abbey (Irish: Mainistir Inis Mac nÉirín) is a former monastery and National Monument located in Lough Key, Ireland.

== Location ==
Inchmacnerin Abbey is located on Church Island, an island of 2.1 hectares (5.2 acres) in the western part of Lough Key.

== History ==
A monastic site existed on the island from the 6th century AD, supposedly founded by Columba (Saint Colum Cille). The name means "island of the sons of Éirín".

It was refounded as an Augustinian priory some time between 1140 and 1170. Some of the Annals of Loch Cé may have been written here, as well as at Holy Trinity Abbey located on the same lake.

It was dissolved c. 1569 and the land granted to William Taaffe in 1596.

The island was excavated in 2000, recovering parts of a stone church.
