= Anthony St Leger =

Anthony St Leger may refer to:

- Anthony St Leger (Lord Deputy of Ireland) (1496–1559)
- Anthony St Leger (British Army officer) (1731–1786), Member of Parliament for Grimsby and Governor of St Lucia
- Anthony St Leger (Master of the Rolls) (c. 1535–1613), English-born judge and Master of the Rolls in Ireland

== See also ==
- Anthony St Ledger (1859–1929), Australian lawyer and politician
