= Stafford-King-Harman baronets =

Extinct baronetcy in the Baronetage of the United Kingdom

The Stafford, later Stafford-King-Harman Baronetcy, of Rockingham in the County of Roscommon, was a title in the Baronetage of the United Kingdom. It was created on 21 January 1914 for Thomas Stafford, in recognition of his services for public health causes in Ireland. He was later a Senator of the Irish Free State. Stafford married Frances Agnes, daughter of Edward Robert King-Harman, of Rockingham, County Roscommon, grandson of The 1st Viscount Lorton (see Viscount Lorton). Their son, the second Baronet, assumed the additional surnames of King and Harman. The title became extinct on his death in 1987.

== Stafford, later Stafford-King-Harman baronets, of Rockingham (1914) ==
- Sir Thomas Stafford, 1st Baronet (1857–1935)
- Sir Cecil William Francis Stafford-King-Harman, 2nd Baronet (1895–1987)

== See also ==
- Viscount Lorton
