= Battle of Curlew Pass =

1599 battle of the Nine Years' War

- Part of the Nine Years' War
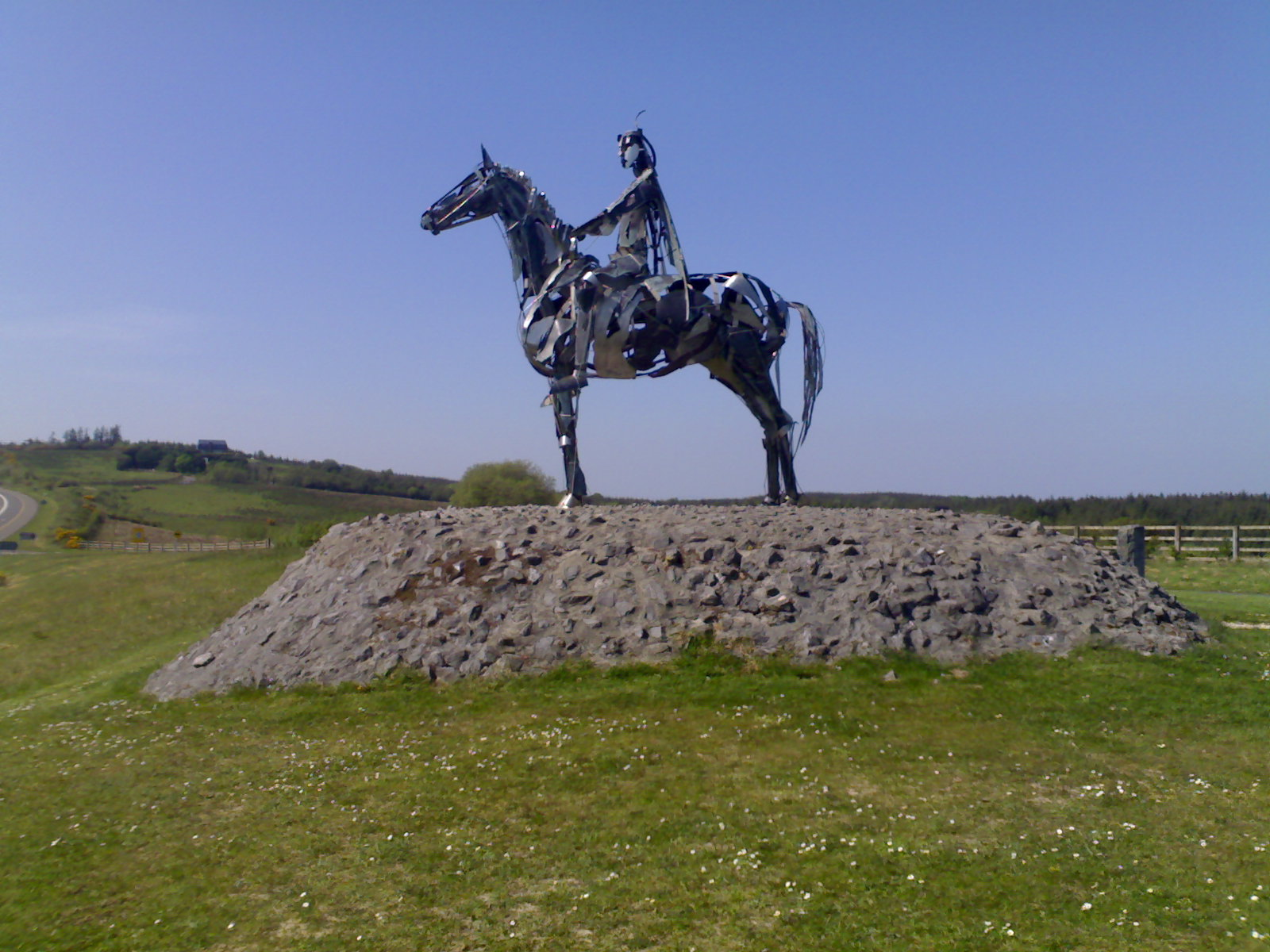
- The Gaelic Chieftain (1999) by Maurice Harron overlooks the N4 bypass and commemorates the battle.
Date	15 August 1599
Location	near Boyle, County Roscommon 53°59′51″N 8°18′44″W
Result	Irish victory

Belligerents
England	Irish alliance

Commanders and leaders
Sir Conyers Clifford †; Sir Alexander Radcliffe †; Captain Ralph Constable; Sir Griffin Markham (WIA); Sir Arthur Savage; Henry Cosby †	Red Hugh O'Donnell; Brian Óg O'Rourke (WIA); Conor MacDermott

Strength
~1,700: 1,500 infantry; 200 Cavalry	~2,500: 1,500 Infantry; 250 Light Cavalry; 600 musketeers; 160 Gallowglasses

Casualties and losses
850 killed	Low
- Location within Ireland

The Battle of Curlew Pass was fought on 15 August 1599 during the campaign of the Earl of Essex in the Nine Years' War, between an English force under Sir Conyers Clifford and a rebel Irish force led by Hugh Roe O'Donnell. The English were ambushed and routed while marching through a pass in the Curlew Mountains, near the town of Boyle, in the west of Ireland. The English forces suffered heavy casualties. Losses by allied Irish forces were not recorded but were probably minimal.

== Campaign ==
In April 1599, the 2nd Earl of Essex landed in Ireland with over 17,000 troops and cavalry to put down the rebellion of Hugh O'Neill, and Red Hugh O'Donnell, which had spread from Ulster to all of Ireland. To this end, he supported one of O'Donnell's Irish enemies, Sir Donogh O'Connor (O'Connor Sligo), encouraging him to retake his territories in County Sligo that O'Donnell had occupied.

Sligo Town was an excellent advance base, with Ballyshannon 20 miles to the north-east commanding an important river-ford at the principal western passage into O'Donnell's country in Ulster. English military advisers had long urged the government councils in Dublin and London to capture these strategic points.

O'Connor's brother-in-law, Tibbot na Long Burke (son of Gráinne O'Malley), was appointed joint-commander with an English captain of a force sailing from Galway, and O'Connor was expected to receive them in Sligo. However, O'Donnell quickly besieged O'Connor at Collooney Castle with over 2,000 men in an effort to starve him out, and Lord Essex was put on the back foot.

Essex had no option but to support the besieged O'Connor, one of the few Gaelic chieftains the Crown could rely upon for support. He ordered the experienced Sir Conyers Clifford, who was based in Athlone, to relieve the castle with 1,500 English infantry and 200 cavalry. It was hoped that the operation would also distract the chief rebel, Tyrone, and afford the Crown an opportunity to march into his Ulster territory across its south-eastern border.

O'Donnell left 300 men at Collooney Castle under his cousin, Niall Garbh O'Donnell, and sent another 600 to Sligo Town to prevent the landing of English reinforcements under Tibbot na Long. He then marched to Dunavaragh with 1,500 of his men, where he was joined by the additional forces of Brian Óg, King of West Breifne, who had 400 soldiers stationed at the pass, as well as those of Conor MacDermott. The Irish then carefully prepared an ambush site in the Curlew Mountains, along the English line of march. O'Donnell had trees felled and placed along the road to impede their progress. When he got word of the English passing through Boyle, O'Donnell positioned his men. Musketeers, archers, and javelin men were placed in the woods alongside the road to harass the English soldiers. The main body of Irish infantry, armed with pikes and axes, were placed out of sight behind the ridge of the mountain.

== Battle ==
In hot harvest weather, Clifford's force marched from Athlone through Roscommon, Tulsk, and Boyle. At 4pm on 15 August, they reached the foot of the Curlew Mountains (highest point 860 feet), which had to be crossed before Sligo could be approached. The expedition was poorly supplied, and Clifford's men were tired and hungry, and probably in no fit state to continue. But Clifford had received false intelligence that the pass was undefended, and he therefore chose to seize the opportunity and march across, promising his troops plenty of beef in the evening. This meant that his men missed out on the rest that had been planned for them in Boyle, whereas the Irish were well-fed and prepared.

The English came under gunfire, arrow and javelin attack as soon as they reached the first of O'Donnell's barricades, between Boyle and Ballinafad. The barricade was lightly defended by just a handful of Irish troops who quickly abandoned it and rode on horseback to their army's camp to inform Red Hugh O'Donnell of the advancing English forces.

Immediately following the news of the advancing English force, Conor MacDermott and his 600 troops moved swiftly into the mountains and took up concealed positions on either side of the bog road near the Bohar-Buidhe Woods.

The English moved past and proceeded up the hill where they sustained further casualties as O'Donnell's skirmishers engaged in hit-and-run attacks on the English formation.

The road consisted of "stones of six or seven foot broad, lying above ground, with plashes of bog between them", and was lined with woodland on one side. The further the English advanced, the more intensive the rebels' fire became, and some English soldiers began to lose their nerve and slip away. Eventually, there was a firefight, lasting about 90 minutes.

Initially the English forces advanced and despite heavy return fire, some of the Irish forces believed they should retreat as they had not expected to engage the English vanguard in open battle. However, MacDermott noticing the heavy casualties the initial fusillades had caused in the English ranks, ordered his pipers to continue sounding battle songs and believed he could destroy Clifford's entire force.

At this point, the English forces began to waver and their advance was halted as the Irish muskets and archers continued to pour fire into their ranks. The English musketeers – running low on gunpowder and ammunition – retreated, leaving their remaining infantry under intense Irish fire.

At this point Radcliffe had been wounded by a gunshot to the face and another to the leg. He ordered Henry Cosby, the Anglo-Irish son of Francis Cosby, to lead an attack but it soon became clear Cosby had no desire to. While being supported in the arms of two of his officers, Radcliffe told Cosby: "I see, Cosby, that I must leave thee to thy baseness, but will tell thee ere I go that it were better to die in the hands of thy countrymen than at my return to perish by my sword".

The half-hearted charge by Cosby turned back and began to retreat. This further demoralised the English forces as they watched their only corps which still showed some sign of holding an intact formation flee the field.

At this point, Brian Óg and his 160 heavy Gallowglasses entered the battle, causing panic amongst the English forces:

Like hounds slipped from the leash, O'Rourke's Brenny men went upon the Queen's vanguard... MacDermott's gunmen and archers gave way to the right hand and to the left, opening out like folding doors as the Brenny men, with a shout at such an instant changed fortitude to alarm, and alarm to panic terror, went upon the foe.

The commander of the vanguard, Alexander Radcliffe, could no longer control his troops. They wheeled about in a panic and collided with the main column, which broke and fled. The commander led a charge with his remaining pikemen but was shot dead in that action. With the English ranks in disarray, the main body of Irish infantry, which had concealed itself on the reverse slope of the hill, closed in and fought hand-to-hand. Clifford tried to regain control over his men, but appeared overcome by his circumstances. He managed to rally himself and was killed by a gun-shot through the chest as he rushed the enemy. Despite his death, the rearguard managed to maintain some semblance of formation and continued to fight on as others fled the field.

Opposing commanders
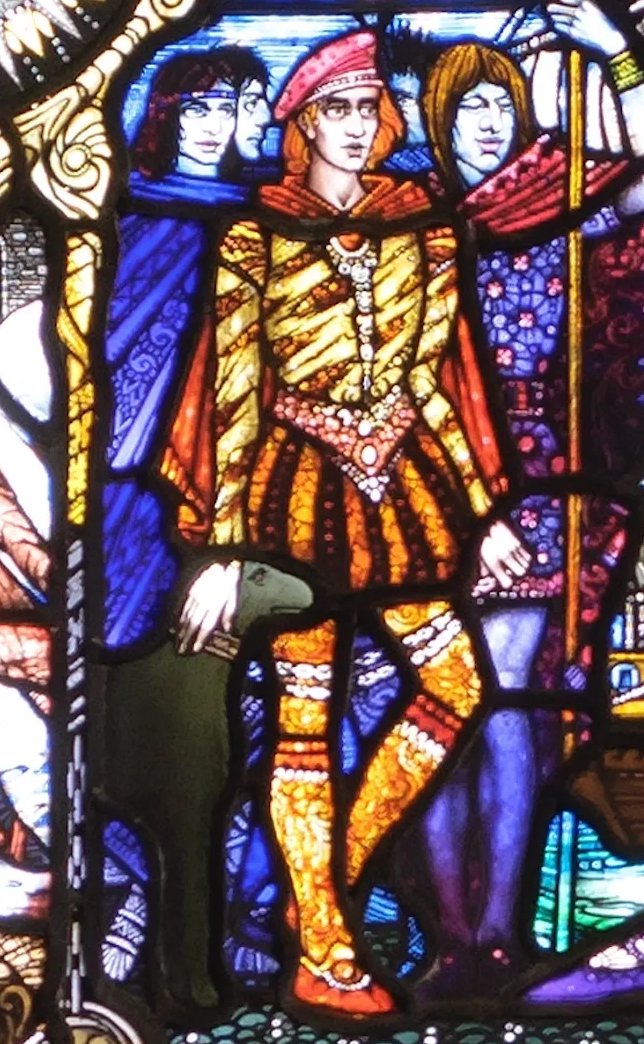
Hugh Roe O'Donnell

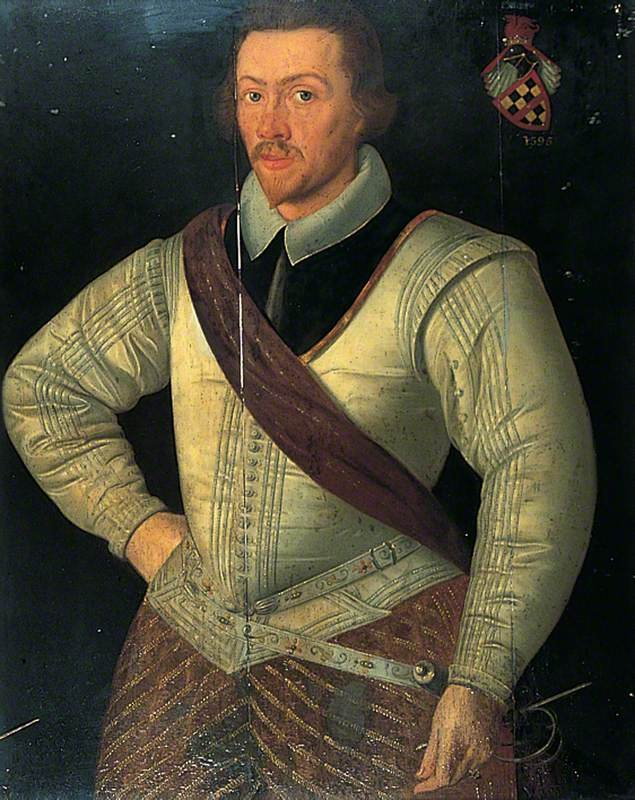
Conyers Clifford

The English were routed, but the situation was prevented from becoming a complete disaster for them when the commander of the horse, Sir Griffin Markham (with John Harington in his ranks), charged uphill - "amongst rocks and bogs where never horse was seen to charge before" - and temporarily drove the rebels back, forcing MacDermott's musketeers and archers out onto either side of the bog and into the tree-line.

As Markham's forces pursued MacDermott's fighters – and English troops fired from the roadside at the gunmen on either side of the bog, Brian Óg led a charge of his own. Emerging from the forest with his gallowglasses he slowly and steadily advanced towards the English cavalry. The English regrouped and began a charge of their own, but on either side of the bog MacDermott's men had regrouped and were now pouring fire transversely on the English cavalry. The gallowglasses supported by the kerne charged the cavalry and routed Markham's forces, causing them to retreat back into the mountains towards the barricade.

During the charge, Brian Óg was injured in the hand and the leg. Markham, meanwhile, was shot resulting in a broken bone in his right arm.

Though the actions of the English cavalry allowed many of their foot soldiers to escape, Clifford's men were pursued as far as the town of Boyle by 400 of MacDermott's musketeers and gunmen alongside the 160 gallowglasses of Brian ÓG. The fleeing English found shelter in Boyle Abbey. About half of the English forces were killed in the battle. Irish losses were light due to having been firing from prepared positions and then routing a disorganized and demoralised enemy.

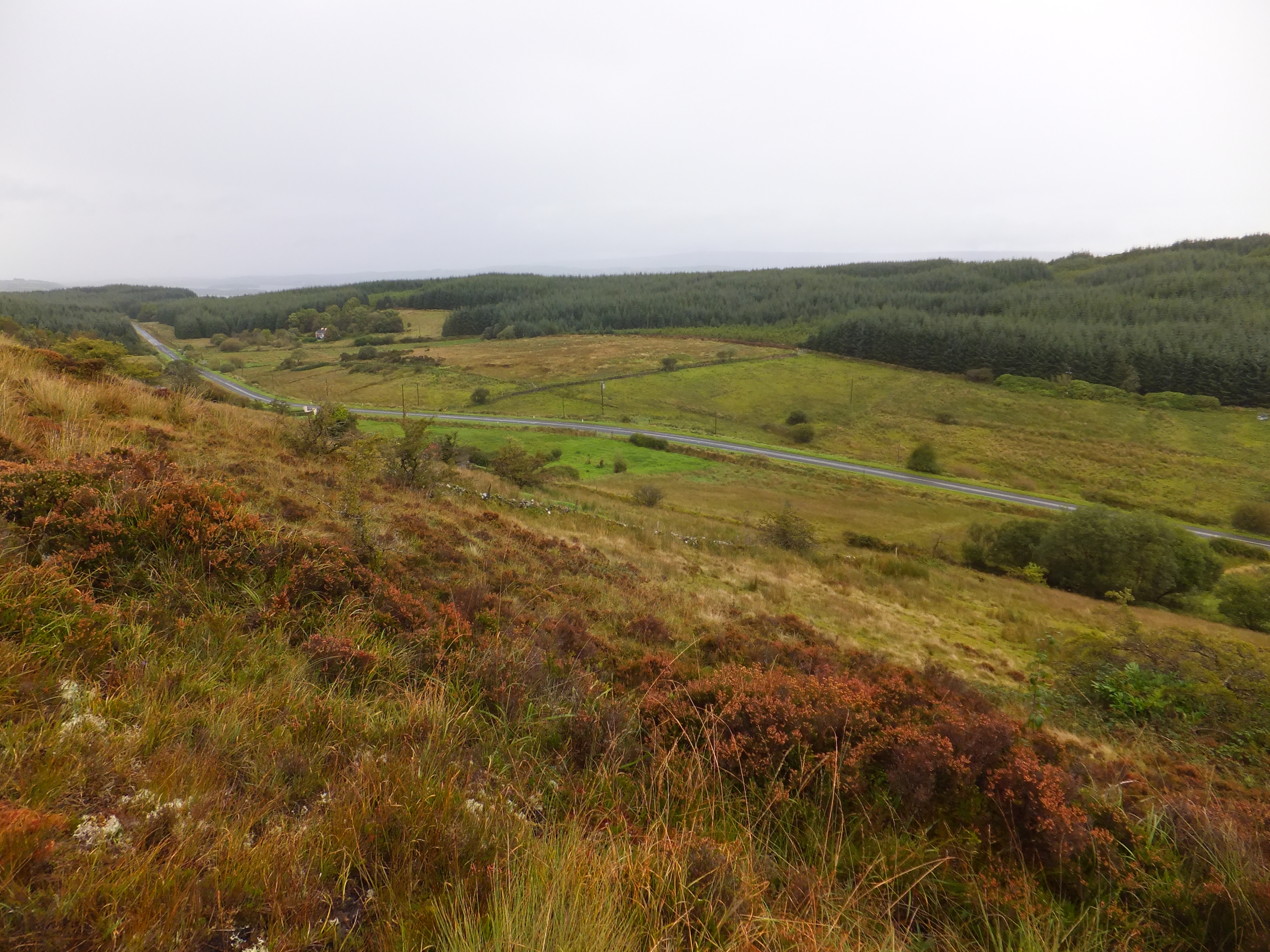
The site of the battle is just over 2km west of the N4

== Aftermath ==
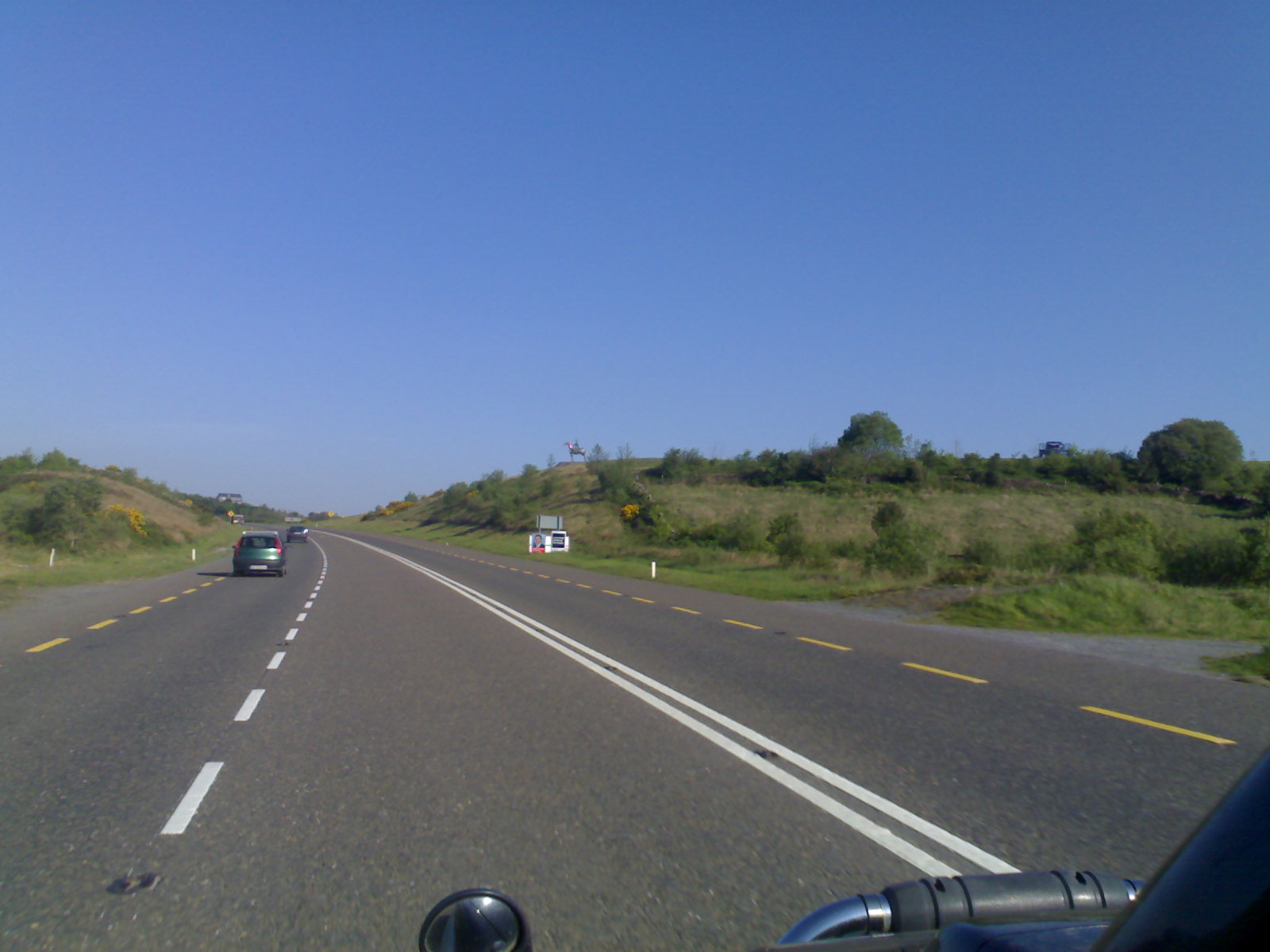
Gaelic Chieftain overlooking Curlew Pass on National 4 road

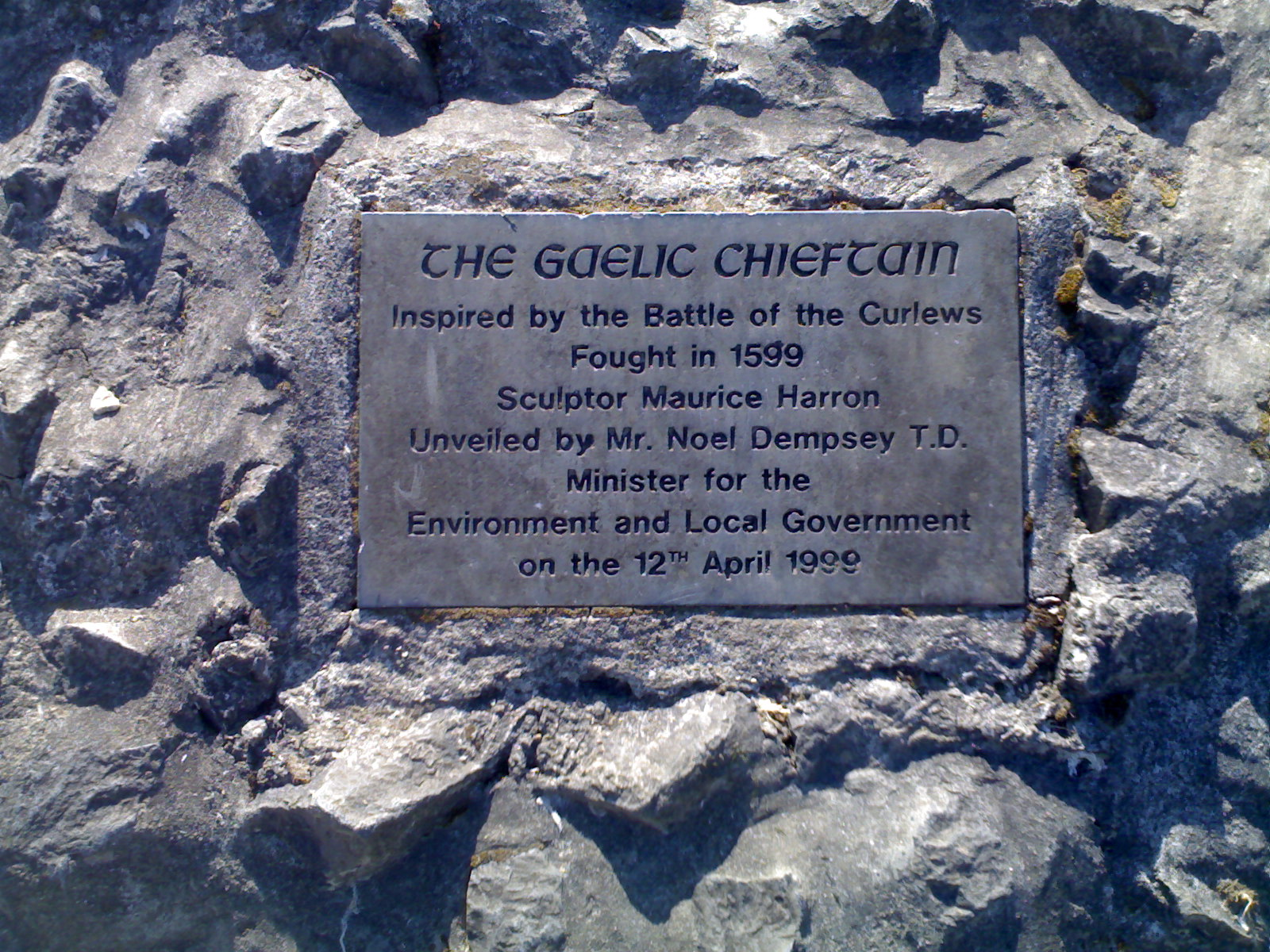
400 years commemoration Gaelic Chieftain Plaque

Brian Óg O'Rourke, who had led the soldiers on the ground, ordered Clifford's head to be cut off and delivered to O'Donnell, who had remained nearby, but without taking part in the fight. While the head was brought to Collooney Castle to intimidate its defenders, the trunk was carried by MacDermott to the monastery of Lough Key, where he hoped to use it to ransom his own prisoners. At last, the trunk was given a decent burial in the monastery, and it was noted at the time that Clifford had lately dreamed of his own capture by O'Donnell and of being carried by monks into their convent.

O'Connor Sligo surrendered the castle shortly afterwards and reluctantly joined with the rebels. After the victory, there was a noticeable increase in the rate of desertion by Irish troops from the ranks of Essex's army, and the earl ordered that the surviving troops be divided up as fit only to hold walls.

The battle was a classic Gaelic Irish ambush, similar to the battle of Glenmalure in 1580 or the battle of the Yellow Ford in 1598. According to the Annals of the Four Masters, the victory was put down to the intercession of the Blessed Mary, rather than to arms. But Clifford had been overconfident – a trait in him that Essex once warned against – and it is clear that English military commanders were choosing to learn the hard way about the increased effectiveness of Irish rebel forces.

The Queen's principal secretary, The Rt Hon. Robert Cecil, M.P., rated this defeat (and the simultaneous defeat of Harrington in Wicklow on 29 May) as the two heaviest blows ever suffered by the English in Ireland, and sought to lay the blame indirectly on Lord Essex. It left O'Donnell and the earl of Tyrone free from any threat from the Connacht side, and rendered a land-based attack through Armagh highly improbable, a factor that weighed with Essex as he marched northward later in the year and entered a truce with Lord Tyrone.

In August 1602 the Curlew Pass was the scene of the last victory won by the rebels during the war, when a panicking English force was again routed and suffered significant losses; this time, the rebels were led by Rory O'Donnell (and with him, O'Connor Sligo) who commanded 400 musketeers.

There is an impressionistic sculpture by Maurice Harron called "The Gaelic Chieftain", unveiled in 1999, overlooking the N4, but this is not on the site of the battle, which is roughly 2 kilometres south-west of the statue.

== Sources ==
- James O'Neill, The Nine Years War, 1593–1603: O'Neill, Mountjoy and the military revolution, (Four Courts Press, Dublin, 2017).
- John McCavitt, The Flight of the Earls, Gill & Macmillan, Dublin 2002.
- Cyril Falls Elizabeth's Irish Wars (1950; reprint London, 1996). ISBN 0-09-477220-7.
- Cyril M. Mattimore, Account of the battle located here
