= Edward King-Harman =

Irish landlord and politician

The Right Honourable Edward King-Harman PC (Ire)
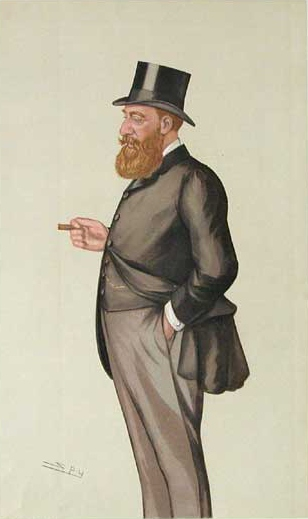
- "The King"; King-Harman as caricatured by Spy (Sir Leslie Ward) in Vanity Fair, January 1886

Parliamentary Under-Secretary for Ireland
- In office 1887–1887

Member of Parliament for Isle of Thanet
- In office 1885–1888
- Preceded by: Constituency created
- Succeeded by: James Lowther

Member of Parliament for County Dublin
- In office 1883–1885 Serving with Ion Trant Hamilton
- Preceded by: Ion Trant Hamilton; Thomas Edward Taylor
- Succeeded by: Constituency divided

Member of Parliament for County Sligo
- In office 1877–1880 Serving with Denis Maurice O'Conor
- Preceded by: Sir Robert Gore-Booth, Bt; Denis Maurice O'Conor
- Succeeded by: Denis Maurice O'Conor; Thomas Sexton

Personal details
- Born: 3 April 1838 Ireland
- Died: 10 June 1888 (aged 50) Rockingham House, Boyle, County Roscommon, Ireland
- Party: Irish Conservative Party (from 1883)
- Other political affiliations: Home Rule League (until 1880)
- Spouse: Anne Worsley
- Parent(s): Lawrence Harman King-Harman; Cecilia Johnstone
- Education: Eton College

Military service
- Allegiance: United Kingdom of Great Britain and Ireland
- Branch/service: (United Kingdom of Great Britain and Ireland) British Army
- Rank: Colonel
- Unit: 60th Rifles; Longford Militia; Connaught Rangers

Photographed by William Lawrence

Edward Robert King-Harman (3 April 1838 – 10 June 1888) was an Irish landlord and politician. He sat in the House of Commons of the United Kingdom between 1877 and 1888 as an Irish nationalist, and later Unionist, Member of Parliament.

== Early life ==
King-Harman was the son of Lawrence Harman King-Harman and his wife Cecilia Johnstone of Stirling. His father was the younger son of Robert King, 1st Viscount Lorton and inherited from him the estates of Rockingham, County Roscommon, and Newcastle, Ballymahon, County Longford. King-Harman was educated at Eton and became a lieutenant in the 60th Rifles and captain in the Longford Militia. He inherited Rockingham Estate which was a fine house built by John Nash, but altered in a less than sympathetic way in the late 19th century in order to provide more accommodation. He was J.P. for the counties of Sligo, Longford and Westmeath and Honorary Colonel of the 5th Battalion, Connaught Rangers. He published in the Freeman's Journal and was a member of the Arts Club from 1863 until his death.

== Political career ==
King-Harman stood unsuccessfully as the Home Government Association candidate in the May 1870 rerun of the December 1869 County Longford by-election after the result of the first vote was overturned. In January 1877, he was elected Member of Parliament for County Sligo but lost the seat at the 1880 general election. He then became Lord Lieutenant and Custos Rotulorum of Roscommon in 1878. In 1883 he was elected MP for County Dublin, until the seat was divided under the Redistribution of Seats Act 1885. He was initially a Nationalist Home Ruler but subsequently became a Unionist. As result of Gladstone's Representation of the People Act 1884 which would extend the Irish franchise, some Orangemen were threatening violence and T. P. O'Connor complained in parliament of several politicians using inflammatory language. O'Connor quoted as an example King-Harman's advice to "Keep the cartridge in the rifle."

In 1885 King-Harman was elected as a Unionist (Conservative) MP for the English seat of Isle of Thanet. In 1887 he was a parliamentary Under-Secretary for Ireland. He held the seat until his death from heart disease at Rockingham in Boyle, Ireland at the age of 49 in 1888.

== Family ==
King-Harman married, in 1864, Emma Frances Worsley, daughter of Sir William Worsley, 1st Baronet. They had one daughter, Frances Agnes, who married Sir Thomas Stafford, 1st Baronet, a physician and member of the Irish Privy Council. They in turn had two sons, the younger of whom, Cecil Stafford-King-Harman, inherited the baronetcy and the Rockingham estates.

Parliament of the United Kingdom
Preceded by Sir Robert Gore Booth, Bt; Denis Maurice O'Conor	Member of Parliament for County Sligo; 1877–1880; With: Denis Maurice O'Conor	Succeeded by Denis Maurice O'Conor; Thomas Sexton
Preceded by Thomas Edward Taylor; Ion Trant Hamilton	Member of Parliament for County Dublin; 1883–1885; With: Ion Trant Hamilton	Constituency divided
New constituency	Member of Parliament for Isle of Thanet; 1885–1888	Succeeded by James Lowther
Honorary titles
Preceded by Edward King Tenison	Lord Lieutenant of Roscommon; 1878–1888	Succeeded by The Earl of Kingston
