= Robin Dunn =

English judge

Sir Robin Horace Walford Dunn MC, PC (16 January 1918 – 5 March 2014) was a British Army officer and judge.

Dunn was born on 16 January 1918, in Trowbridge, the son of an officer in the Royal Field Artillery. He was educated at St Aubyns School, Wellington College, and the Royal Military Academy, Woolwich, where he won the Sword of Honour. He was commissioned into the Royal Artillery in 1938. During World War II, he initially served in France and Belgium, before being evacuated at Dunkirk in 1940. He then fought in North Africa and in Normandy. During the war, he was wounded three times. He was awarded the Military Cross in 1944 and was mentioned in dispatches twice. He retired his commission in 1948, retaining the rank of honorary major.

Dunn was called to the bar by the Inner Temple in 1948, and was appointed a Queen's Counsel in 1962. In 1969, he was appointed to the High Court, receiving the customary knighthood. Initially assigned to the Probate, Divorce and Admiralty Division, he became a judge in Family Division when the former was abolished in 1971. He was appointed a Lord Justice of Appeal in 1980 and sworn of the Privy Council, serving until his retirement in 1984.

Dunn married Judith Allan Pilcher the daughter of High Court judge Gonne Pilcher, in 1941; they had three children and divorced in 1995. In 1997, he married Joan Stafford-King-Harman, daughter of Cecil Stafford-King-Harman.
