= Joan Stafford-King-Harman =

English socialite (1918–2018)

- Born: 7 March 1918
- Died: 12 July 2018 (aged 100); Meole Brace, Shrewsbury, England
- Burial place: Odiham Cemetery, Hampshire, England
- Employer(s): Air Raid Precautions, MI6, Bletchley Park
- Spouse(s): George Dennehy (m. 1943, died 1990); Robin Horace Walford Dunn (m. 1997, died 2014)
- Father: Cecil Stafford-King-Harman

Cecily Joan Stafford-King-Harman (7 March 1918 – 12 July 2018), also Mrs Dennehy, later Lady Dunn, was an English socialite and one of the first women to work for MI6.

== Biography ==
The daughter of Sir Cecil Stafford-King-Harman, 2nd Baronet, of Rockingham in County Roscommon, Ireland, and his wife, the former Sarah Beatrice Acland, she "came out" into London society as a debutante in 1935. Her only brother, Thomas Stafford King-Harman, was killed in Normandy in 1944.

During the 1930s, she visited Germany and was impressed with Adolf Hitler. By the time of her death, she was one of the last living people to have met Hitler in person. Having volunteered for Air Raid Precautions (ARP) service at the start of the Second World War in 1939, she was recruited to MI6 by Admiral John Godfrey, mainly for her knowledge of the German language, and worked as a confidential secretary alongside Kim Philby. The department was moved to Bletchley Park, where she also met future author Ian Fleming.

In 1943, she married Captain George Dennehy of the Irish Guards, who later became a solicitor; he died in 1990. From her first marriage, she had four daughters; Rosemary, Sarah, Mary and Caroline. By the time of her death she had 16 grandchildren and 32 great-grandchildren.

Her second husband, whom she married in 1997, was the judge Sir Robin Horace Walford Dunn, whom she had known since childhood; he had three children from his first marriage. Sir Robin died in 2014.

Lady Dunn spent her last years as a resident at Maesbrook care home, Meole Brace, Shrewsbury, where she died in 2018 aged 100 years. A Roman Catholic, she was buried at Odiham Cemetery, Hampshire, on 25 July 2018 following a requiem mass at Shrewsbury Cathedral.
