= Torpshammar =

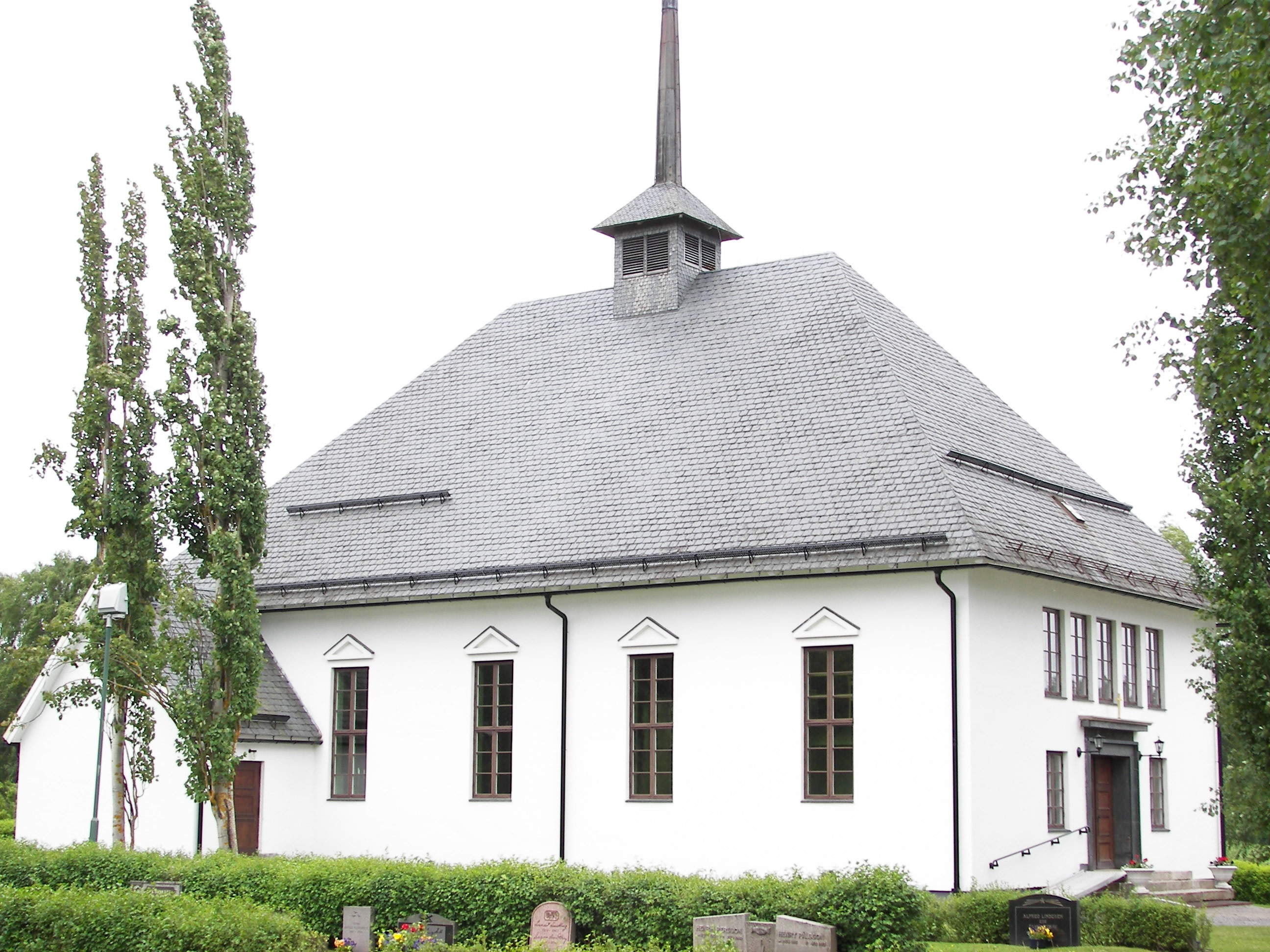
- Torpshammar Church

- Location within Västernorrland Location within Sweden
- Coordinates: 62°29′N 16°20′E
- Country: Sweden
- Province: Medelpad
- County: Västernorrland County
- Municipality: Ånge Municipality

Area
  - Total: 1.63 km^{2} (0.63 sq mi)

Population (31 December 2010)
  - Total: 444
  - Density: 272/km^{2} (700/sq mi)
- Time zone: UTC+1 (CET)
  - Summer (DST): UTC+2 (CEST)

Torpshammar (Swedish pronunciation: [tɔrpsˈhâmːar]) is a locality situated in Ånge Municipality, Västernorrland County, Sweden with 444 inhabitants in 2010. It was founded in 1797 as an iron milling community. It is known for being home to the first location of Boda Borg.

== Climate ==
Torpshammar has traditionally had a subarctic climate, although due to recent warming it is transitioning to a humid continental climate with four distinct seasons, cold winters and warm but short summers.

Climate data for Torpshammar 2002–2018; extremes since 1931
Month	Jan	Feb	Mar	Apr	May	Jun	Jul	Aug	Sep	Oct	Nov	Dec	Year
Record high °C (°F)	9.8 (49.6)	11.6 (52.9)	18.2 (64.8)	24.2 (75.6)	29.0 (84.2)	33.6 (92.5)	33.9 (93.0)	34.6 (94.3)	26.7 (80.1)	21.9 (71.4)	14.2 (57.6)	9.6 (49.3)	34.6 (94.3)
Mean maximum °C (°F)	4.4 (39.9)	6.6 (43.9)	11.5 (52.7)	17.9 (64.2)	24.7 (76.5)	27.0 (80.6)	29.4 (84.9)	27.1 (80.8)	22.2 (72.0)	15.2 (59.4)	8.9 (48.0)	6.1 (43.0)	30.4 (86.7)
Mean daily maximum °C (°F)	−3.8 (25.2)	−1.7 (28.9)	3.9 (39.0)	10.1 (50.2)	15.9 (60.6)	19.6 (67.3)	22.7 (72.9)	20.5 (68.9)	15.6 (60.1)	8.0 (46.4)	1.7 (35.1)	−2.1 (28.2)	9.2 (48.6)
Daily mean °C (°F)	−8.1 (17.4)	−6.3 (20.7)	−1.6 (29.1)	4.0 (39.2)	9.3 (48.7)	13.3 (55.9)	16.4 (61.5)	14.8 (58.6)	10.3 (50.5)	3.8 (38.8)	−1.5 (29.3)	−5.9 (21.4)	4.0 (39.3)
Mean daily minimum °C (°F)	−12.3 (9.9)	−10.9 (12.4)	−7.1 (19.2)	−2.2 (28.0)	2.7 (36.9)	6.9 (44.4)	10.1 (50.2)	9.0 (48.2)	4.9 (40.8)	−0.4 (31.3)	−4.7 (23.5)	−9.6 (14.7)	−1.1 (30.0)
Mean minimum °C (°F)	−25.5 (−13.9)	−24.0 (−11.2)	−19.5 (−3.1)	−8.7 (16.3)	−4.3 (24.3)	0.2 (32.4)	3.8 (38.8)	2.0 (35.6)	−2.0 (28.4)	−8.0 (17.6)	−14.6 (5.7)	−21.4 (−6.5)	−28.1 (−18.6)
Record low °C (°F)	−42.0 (−43.6)	−38.8 (−37.8)	−37.8 (−36.0)	−19.4 (−2.9)	−9.0 (15.8)	−2.2 (28.0)	0.2 (32.4)	−1.6 (29.1)	−7.9 (17.8)	−20.0 (−4.0)	−28.8 (−19.8)	−41.7 (−43.1)	−42.0 (−43.6)
Average precipitation mm (inches)	31.7 (1.25)	21.2 (0.83)	18.3 (0.72)	22.9 (0.90)	46.5 (1.83)	61.1 (2.41)	72.9 (2.87)	81.9 (3.22)	41.5 (1.63)	43.6 (1.72)	32.5 (1.28)	36.2 (1.43)	510.3 (20.09)
Source 1: SMHI Open Data
Source 2: SMHI climate data 2002–2018
