= Boda Borg =

Chain of entertainment facilities

- Boda Borg Logo
- Industry: Entertainment facility
- Founded: 1995
- Headquarters: Laguna Hills, California, United States
- Number of locations: 10 locations (2020)
- Area served: Sweden; Ireland; Switzerland; United States; Germany
- Key people: David Spigner (CEO)
- Website: https://www.bodaborg.com

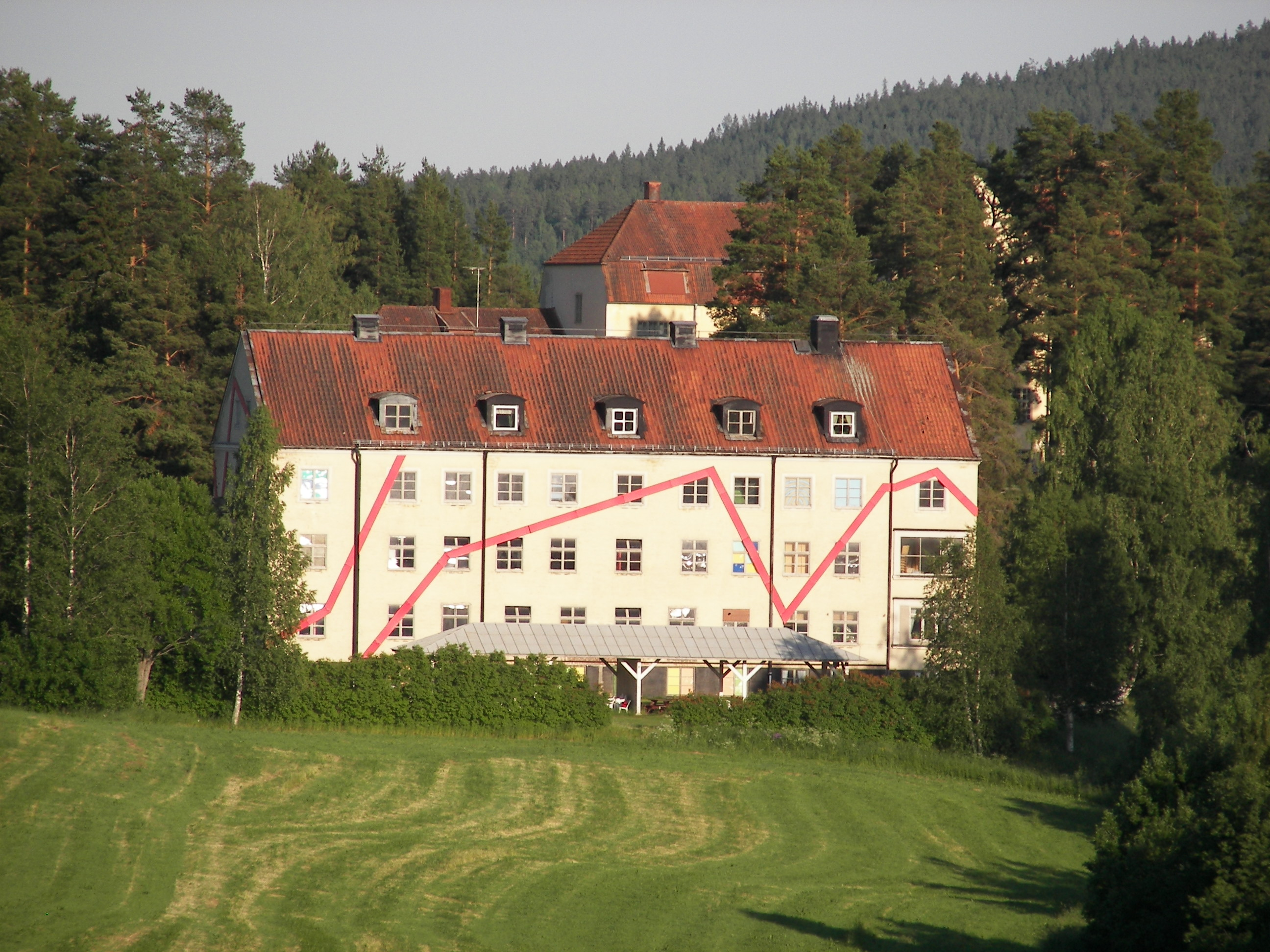
The original Boda Borg location in Torpshammar, Sweden

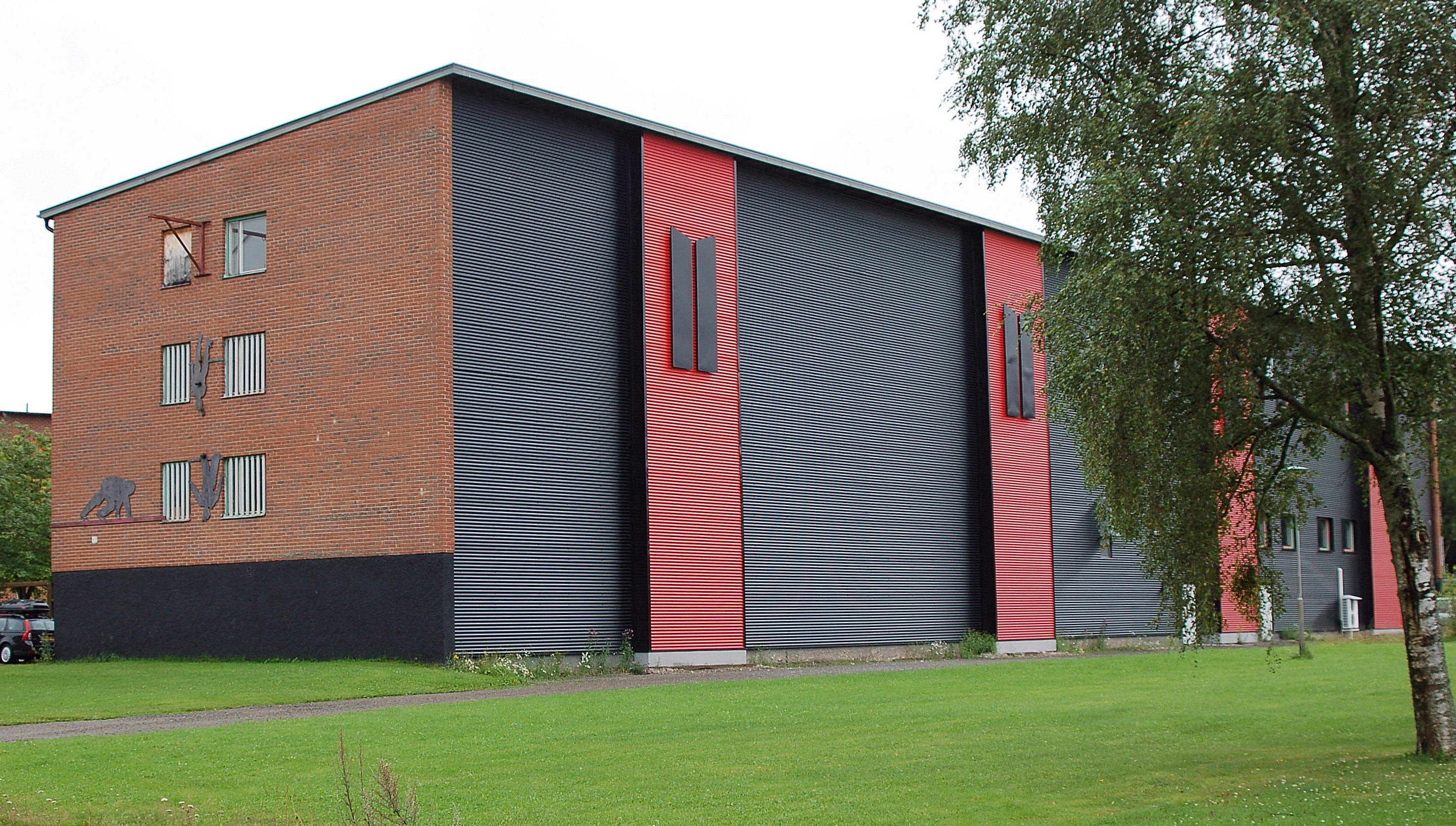
Boda Borg in Karlskoga, Sweden

Boda Borg is a Swedish indoor amusement park chain located throughout Sweden, as well as in Ireland, Switzerland, Germany and the United States. Each location consists of multiple "quests," which each contain a series of rooms. The patrons of the facility must use mental and physical skills to proceed through the quests. As of 2020, it operates seven locations in Sweden, located in Karlskoga, Karlskrona, Oxelösund, Skellefteå, Sävsjö, Torpshammar, and Östersund; one location in Ireland, located in Lough Key Forest Park; one location in Switzerland, located in Zürich; and one location in the U.S., located in Malden, Massachusetts.

== History ==
The first facility was opened in 1995 in Torpshammar, a village located in Medelpad, Sweden. Built on the site of the former Bodaborg insane asylum, it was the result of a project to revitalise rural development in northern Sweden.

In 2008, current CEO David Spigner and three other investors purchased Boda Borg and formed the international Boda Borg Corporation, which is headquartered in Laguna Hills, California.

In 2015, entrepreneur Chad Ellis opened Boda Borg Boston in Malden, Massachusetts. This was Boda Borg's first location in the United States.
