= McDermott's Castle =

Castle in County Roscommon, Ireland

- Carraig Mhic Dhiarmada (Irish)
- The Rock; MacDermot's Castle; Carrick McDermott
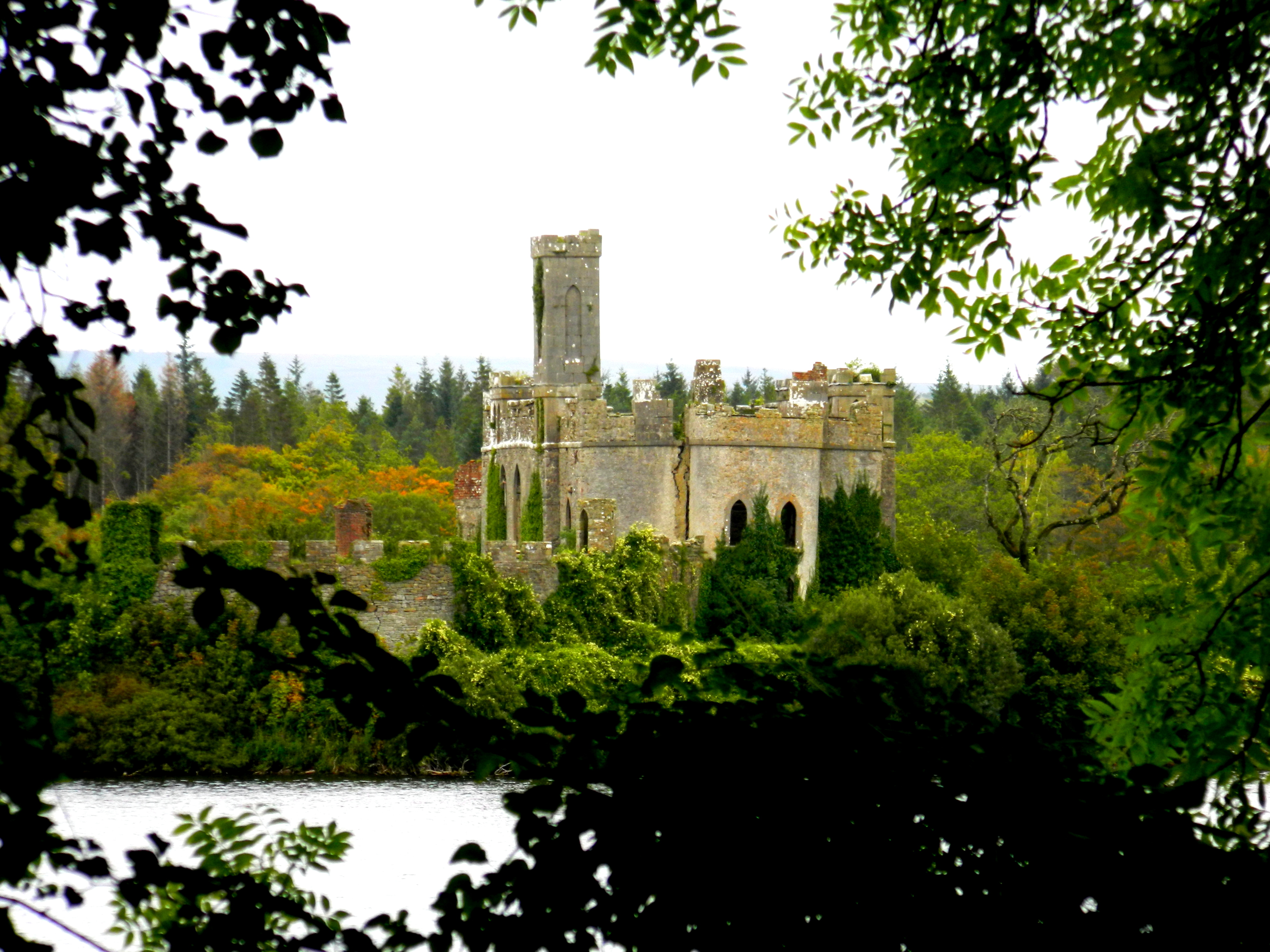

- Location within Ireland
- 53.989522°N 8.232580°W
- Type: Castle
- Location: Castle Island, Lough Key, County Roscommon, Ireland

National monument of Ireland
- Official name: McDermott's Castle (Castle Island)
- Reference no.: 586

McDermott's Castle is a castle and protected national monument located in County Roscommon, Ireland. The site of a fortification since at least the 13th century, the structure's tower house may date from the 16th century, with much of the current building (including its crenellations) dating to the 19th century.

== Location ==
McDermott's Castle is located on Castle Island, an island of 0.23 hectares (0.57 acres) in the southeast corner of Lough Key.

== History ==
The Mac Diarmada were the ruling dynasty of Magh Luirg (Moylurg; northeast Connacht) from the 10th to 16th centuries. A castle stood on this island from the 12th century: in 1184, the Annals of Loch Cé report that a lightning bolt caused a fire:

The Rock of Loch-Cé was burned by lightning, i.e. the
very magnificent, kingly residence of the descendents of Máel Ruanaid where neither goods nor people of all that were
there found protection; where six score, or seven score, of
distinguished persons were destroyed, along with fifteen
men of the race of kings and chieftains, with the wife of
Mac Diarmada, i.e. the daughter of Ó hEidhin, and his
son's wife, i.e. the daughter of Domhnall O'Conchobhair,
and the daughter of Ó Dubhda, and the son of Donnchadh
O'Maelbhrenuinn, and the son of Donn O'Mannachain,
and the two daughters of O'Mannachain, and Mac Maenaigh,
chieftain of Cenél-Builg, and the priest O'Maelbealtaine,
and Gillachiarain Ó Connachtain, (i.e. a son of
chastity and lamp of piety), and a countless destruction
besides of good men; and every one of them who was not
burned was drowned in this tumultuous consternation,
in the entrance of the place; so that there escaped not
alive therefrom but Conchobar mac Diarmata with a
very small number of the multitude of his people.

A rebuilt castle featured in the final part of the 1235 conquest of Connacht by Richard Mór de Burgh, 1st Baron of Connaught. The castle came under siege, first by a raft-mounted catapult, and then by fire ships. Cormac MacDermott, King of Moylurg, was forced to surrender.

A poem addressed to Tomaltach an Einigh mac Diarmata (King of Moylurg 1421–58) tells the story of the Hag of Lough Key who used (or abused) Cormac MacDermott's (king 1218–44) hospitality by staying on the Rock for a full year, and laid upon the McDermotts the obligation of perpetual hospitality.

The McDermotts lost the island in 1586, and Eochaidh Ó hÉoghusa (1567–1617) wrote a poem lamenting the castle's emptiness.

By the early 19th century the castle was in ruin, until architect John Nash was commissioned to redevelop the structure as a summer house or folly.

In 2014, the island and castle featured in an episode of sitcom Moone Boy, as the residence of the mysterious "Island Joe."

In 2018, the castle was put up for sale for €80,000. However, the sale was later withdrawn and the castle returned to private Irish ownership.

In 2019, archaeological excavations were also undertaken on the island. The excavations concluded that the island itself is essentially a multi-period fortification, with the earliest elements dating to the early medieval era. An earlier, two to three meter thick enclosure wall pre-dating the standing enclosure wall was excavated at a depth of a meter and a half. Medieval buildings dating to the thirteenth century were excavated on the northern side of the island above the earlier fortification, but were not found to be connected to the standing enclosure wall. High-status Gaelic artifacts were discovered, including silver pins, a gaming piece, and large collections of butchered cattle, boar, and sheep. The research on the island was featured in Archaeology Magazine.

== Building ==
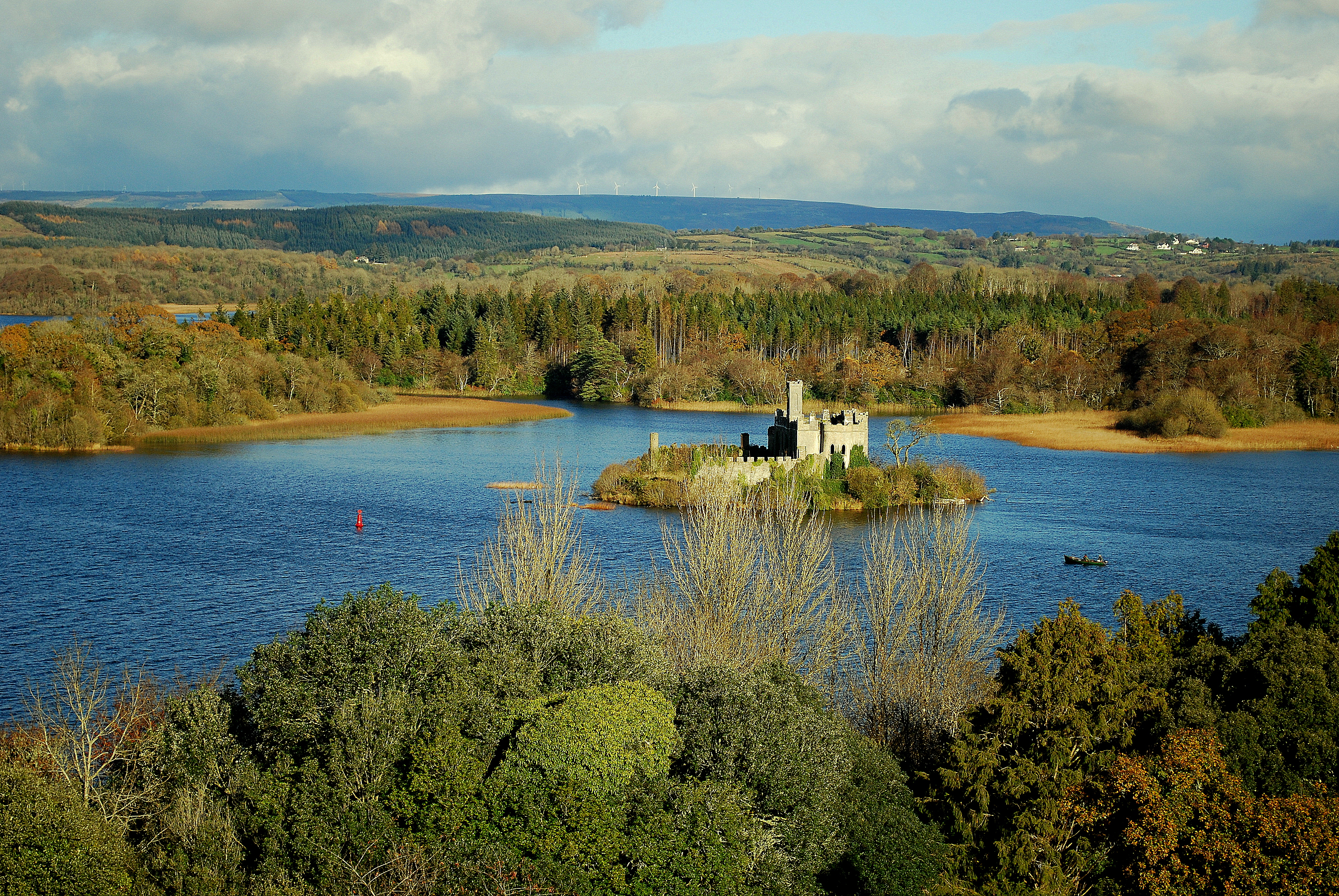
View of Castle Island in Lough Key

The standing remains on the island date from at least three distinct periods.

The enclosure wall around the island are the earliest standing remains. O'Conor et al. argued that the enclosure wall is probably of medieval construction, but the wall has not been dated, and the excavations by Finan and Schryver were not able to connect the enclosure wall to their excavations. O'Conor et al. identified a late medieval tower house on the interior of main standing building. An arrow slot and medieval windows are found on the western wall of this tower house. The additions on either side of the tower, as well as the kitchen on the eastern side of the tower, were added by the architect John Nash in the early nineteenth century to form a summer house. At that time, windows were inserted into the later medieval tower house. The enclosure wall was modified on the northern end of the island in order to provide a view from the main window inserted into the tower. Isaac Weld, writing in 1832, describes as part of "the castle proper" two rooms, one above the other, each 36 by 22 feet (11.0 m × 6.7 m), with walls 7 1/2 feet (2.3 m) thick. It is not clear whether this refers to part of the original castle, or the later construction.

The summer house, as built by Nash, burned down during the mid-20th century.
