= Sir Thomas Stafford, 1st Baronet =

Anglo-Irish medical doctor (1857–1935)

Sir Thomas Joseph Stafford, 1st Baronet CB DL (3 May 1857 – 11 May 1935) was an Anglo-Irish medical doctor and official in the Dublin Castle administration of Ireland.

== Biography ==
Stafford was born in Portobello, County Roscommon, the second son of John Stafford. He qualified as licentiate of the Royal College of Physicians of Ireland in 1882 and established a medical practice at Boyle, County Roscommon. In the 1890s he was appointed as the medical commissioner of the Local Government Board for Ireland, with responsibility for administering the Irish Poor Laws. In this role he conducted the first systematic research into urban poverty in twentieth-century Ireland. His findings, particularly relating to chronic deprivation in Dublin, were submitted to the royal commission on the poor laws in 1905. In 1898, he was conferred a diploma by the Royal Institute of Public Health and the following year he became a member of the Royal College of Surgeons in Ireland.

Stafford collaborated with the Marchioness of Aberdeen to combat tuberculosis, serving on a government committee in 1912 and implementing its recommendations at a local level. In 1906, Stafford was appointed a Companion of the Order of the Bath, and on 21 January 1914 he was made a baronet, of Rockingham in the Baronetage of the United Kingdom. He 1916 he was made a Deputy Lieutenant of County Roscommon and in 1918 he was made a member of the Privy Council of Ireland. In 1920 he became member of the Lord Lieutenant of Ireland's advisory board. In 1921, Stafford resigned from the British administration in Ireland because of what he regarded as the severity of the administration of John French, 1st Earl of Ypres during the Irish War of Independence.

In 1921, Stafford was elected as a member of the short-lived Senate of Southern Ireland, but he did not attend either to the Senate's two sessions prior to its dissolution. Stafford died in 1935 while visiting Geoffrey Taylour, 4th Marquess of Headfort.

In 1890, he married Frances Agnes, daughter of Edward King-Harman. Together they had two sons. The eldest, Edward, was killed in 1914 during the First World War, while the younger son, Cecil, inherited his father's baronetcy.

Baronetage of the United Kingdom
New creation	Baronet (of Rockingham); 1914–1935	Succeeded by Cecil Stafford-King-Harman
