= Gonne Pilcher =

Sir Gonne Pilcher MC

Justice of the High Court
- In office 8 October 1942 – 30 September 1961

Personal details
- Education: Trinity College, Cambridge

Sir Gonne St Clair Pilcher, MC (19 September 1890 – 3 April 1966) was a British barrister and High Court judge. An Admiralty specialist, he sat in the Probate, Divorce and Admiralty Division from 1942 to 1951, and in the King's Bench Division from 1951 to 1961.

== Biography ==
Gonne Pilcher (nicknamed "Toby" within his family) was the eldest son of Major-General Thomas David Pilcher, CB, and Kathleen Mary, younger daughter of Colonel Thomas Gonne, of the 17th Lancers. Gonne Pilcher's aunt was Irish radical Maud Gonne, whose son, Seán MacBride, was a Clann na Poblachta politician and Irish Republican Army Chief-of-Staff.

Pilcher was educated at Wellington College and Trinity College, Cambridge, where he took honours in the Mediaeval and Modern Languages tripos in 1911. He was called to the Bar by the Inner Temple in 1915. During the First World War, he served in France and Belgium, for which he was mentioned in dispatches and was awarded the Military Cross. After the war, he initially joined the chambers of William Jowitt (later Earl Jowitt), before moving to Admiralty chambers. He was Junior Counsel to the Admiralty in the Admiralty Court from 1935 to 1936, when he became a King's Counsel. He was appointed Deputy Chairman of the Somerset Quarter Sessions in 1938.

During the Second World War, he was officially described as an attached officer at the War Office from September 1939 to October 1942; in reality, he was part of a group of lawyers recruited as officers by MI5. In 1942, he was appointed a Justice of the High Court pursuant to joint addresses from both Houses of Parliament in succession to Mr Justice Langton, who was found dead in unusual circumstances.

He was assigned to the Probate, Divorce and Admiralty Division and received the customary knighthood. He was mainly concerned with the Admiralty side of the Division's work, though he dealt with probate and divorce cases as well. On 9 May 1951, he was transferred to the King's Bench Division, where he sat until his retirement in 1961.

Pilcher was vice-president of the Comité Maritime International from 1947 to 1962, president of the British Maritime Law Association from 1950 to 1962, and chairman of the committee appointed to enquire into the administration of justice under Naval Discipline Act from 1950 to 1951. He headed the United Kingdom's delegation to the Brussels Diplomatic Conference on International Maritime Conventions in May 1952, September 1958, and May 1961.

In 1918, Pilcher married Janet, elder daughter of Allan Hughes, of Lynch, Allerford, Somerset. They had a son, killed on active service in 1941, and a daughter, Judith, who married Robin Dunn (later a Lord Justice of Appeal) in 1941.
