= Clarus Mag Máilin =

13th-century Irish monk

Clarus Mag Máilin (fl. 1215–1251) Irish monk. Mag Máilin was a member of an erenagh and brehon family located in Moylurg, a kingdom in the north of what is now County Roscommon.

According to the Travelmania Ireland website,

- "Clarus Mac Mailin, son of the erenach of Inchmacnerin, who died 1251, founded the monastery of the Premonstratensians (reformed Augustinians), dedicated to the Holy Trinity, in 1215. The ranks of Canons were augmented in 1228 by the defection of monks from the Cistercian Abbey of Boyle, which was seen by the Cistercian Council of that year as having become too gaelicized. The monks brought with them their manuscripts and learning, which, under Clarus' direction, developed eventually into the great manuscripts of the Annals of Lough Key and the Annals of Connacht."

== In the Annals of Connacht ==
- 1237 - Clarus Mac Mailin began the building of a monastery for Canons on Trinity Island in Loch Oughter, the gift of Cathal O Raigillig.
- 1237 - Drommann Iarthair and the land between Lathach Cille Brain and the lake, with wood and plain and bog, was presented to the community of the Trinity on Loch Key and to Clarus Mac Mailin by Donnchad son of Muirchertach Luathsuilech [Mac Diarmata] during the time that he ruled as king; and this was not long, since he reigned only for a month and Cormac reigned again.
- 1242 - The hospital of Sligo was presented by the Justiciar to Clarus Mag Mailin, in honour of the Trinity.
- 1245 - The castle of Sligo was built by Mac Muiris Fitz Gerald, Justiciar of Ireland, and by the Sil Murray. For Fedlim [O Conchobair] was bidden to build it at his own cost and to take the stones and lime of the spital house of the Trinity for the building, though the Justiciar had previously given that site to Clarus Mag Mailin in honour of the Holy Trinity. But Master John, elected to the bishoprick of Elphin by Clarus, Archdeacon of that see, and by Malachy the Cathedral Dean and Gelasius the Sacristan, proceeded to visit the Lord Pope at Lyons-sur-Rhone, where he was in exile, having been expelled from the Holy See by the Roman Emperor; and he found such favour in the eyes of the Lord Pope and of the papal court that the election of Comarba Comain by the junior canons of the choir of Elphin was quashed, while his own election by the elder clergy, though fewer in number, was honoured, the Lord Pope giving him letters for the Archbishop of Tuaim ordering his consecration as bishop in the name of Jesus Christ our Lord. He was consecrated, and on the day of his consecration the faithful of Christ and seekers to preserve the truth answered: "Thanks be to God."
- 1247 - Cathal and Toirrdelbach, sons of Aed O Conchobair, made a hosting to help Cathal Mag Ragnaill expel Mac Gosdelb from Feda Conmaicne. They captured the crannog and the lake and broke down the castle of Lecc Derg on the Saturday before Pentecost. And Toirrdelbach came to Trinity Island to fetch Clarus Mac Mailin, since the Galls had refused to come out of the castle unless the Archdeacon would escort them westwards across the Shannon to Tumna. So they came away with him, and the Clann Gosdelb were expelled from the whole territory.
- 1250 - White Canons of the Premonstrant Order were taken shortly before Christmas by Clarus Mac Mailin from Trinity Island in Loch Key to Trinity Island in Loch Oughter in Brefne, and canons of the Order were instituted there by permission of Cathal O Raigillig, who presented the site as an absolute and perpetual alms in honour of the Holy Trinity. And Clarus so acted, in the name of God, for this reason—that the Premonstratensians enjoy a privilege similar to that of the monks, in that they can pass [from their own] to any other house.
- 1251 - Clarus Archdeacon of Elphin, a provident and prudent man, who mortified the flesh with fasting and prayer, who kept the law of patience and his tonsure, who was persecuted by many on account of his righteousness, the revered founder of the houses of the community of the Holy Trinity at Loch Key, where he chose a place of burial for himself, rested in Christ in that same place on the Saturday before Pentecost Sunday; on whose soul may almighty God in Heaven, Whose servant he was in the world, and to the honour of Whom he built the church at Randoon, the monastery of the Holy Trinity in Loch Oughter and the church of the Holy Trinity at Cell Ras, have mercy.
