= Cormac MacDermott =

13th-century Irish ruler

Cormac MacDermot was a 13th-century Irish ruler who was King of Moylurg, reigning 1218–44.

A great-great-great-grandson of Cormac, Dermot Ruadh MacDermot, was ancestor of the MacDermot Roe sept of the family.

Preceded by Dermot MacDermott	King of Moylurg; 1218 - 1244	Succeeded by Muirchertach MacDermot
