= Lough Key =

Lake in County Roscommon, Ireland

- Loch Cé (Irish)
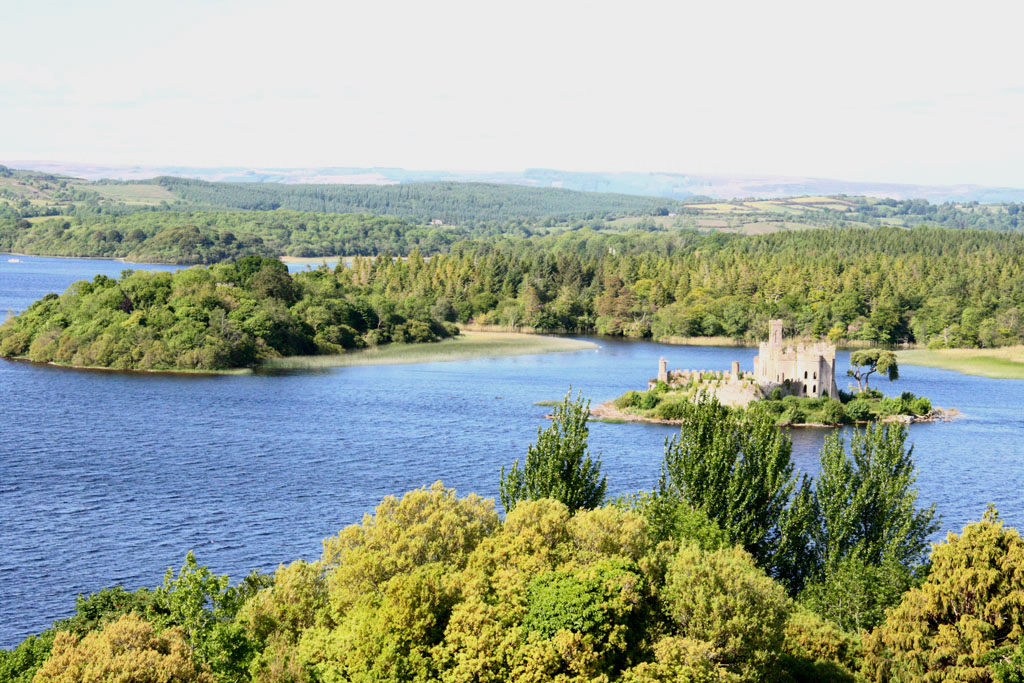
- Lough Key and Castle Island

- Location in Ireland
- Location: County Roscommon
- Coordinates: 54°0′N 8°15′W
- Basin countries: Ireland
- Max. length: 5 kilometres (3.1 mi)
- Max. width: 3 kilometres (1.9 mi)
- Surface area: 843.7 ha (2,085 acres)
- Average depth: 5.1 m (17 ft)
- Max. depth: 21.8 m (72 ft)
- Water volume: 43 hm^{3} (35,000 acre⋅ft)
- Islands: 32 (incl. Castle Island, Stag Island, Bullock Island, and Drumman's Island)

Lough Key (Irish: Loch Cé) is a lake in Ireland. It is in northern County Roscommon, northeast of the town of Boyle. The lough is believed to be named after a mythical figure named Cé.

== Name ==
The name Lough Key comes from the Irish Loch Cé. In Irish mythology, Cé was the druid of the god Nuada. He was wounded in the Second Battle of Mag Tuired and fled southward until he came to Carn Corrslebe, where he rested. He saw ahead of him a beautiful plain full of flowers. He sought to reach it, and when he did, he died. When his grave was dug there, a lake burst out of it, and flooded the whole plain. It was thus named Loch Cé after him.

== Geography ==
The lake is in the northern part of the River Shannon drainage basin, and is fed by the Boyle River which flows from Lough Gara, through the town of Boyle, into Lough Key. From there it flows eastwards until it reaches the River Shannon just above Carrick-on-Shannon. Its area is 843.7 hectares (2,085 acres) and its average depth is 5.1 metres (17 ft). One can see a view of the lake from the N4 road as it ascends the Curlew Mountains after bypassing Boyle. The view is enhanced by a modern steel sculpture of an Irish chieftain mounted on horseback (see photograph).

== Background ==
The area around Lough Key and the nearby town of Boyle, in County Roscommon, has been inhabited for thousands of years.

The lake is several kilometres across and contains over thirty wooded islands including Castle Island, Trinity Island, Orchard Island, Stag Island, Bullock Island, and Drumman's Island. Castle Island has had a number of structures built on it over the centuries. The earliest record dates to 1184, in the Annals of Loch Cé, where a lightning strike is reported to have started a fire in "The Rock of Loch-Cé," a "very magnificent, kingly residence." Currently a folly castle built in the early 19th century by the King family stands on the island. Trinity and Church Islands each have the ruins of medieval priories standing on them.

== 17th-20th centuries ==
The King family acquired the land around Lough Key in the 17th century Cromwellian Settlement, renaming the area from Moylurg to Rockingham. In 1809, Rockingham House – a mansion designed by English architect John Nash – was built. The house remained the seat of the Stafford-King-Harman family until it was badly damaged in a fire in 1957. It was subsequently demolished in 1970.

== Lough Key Forest Park ==
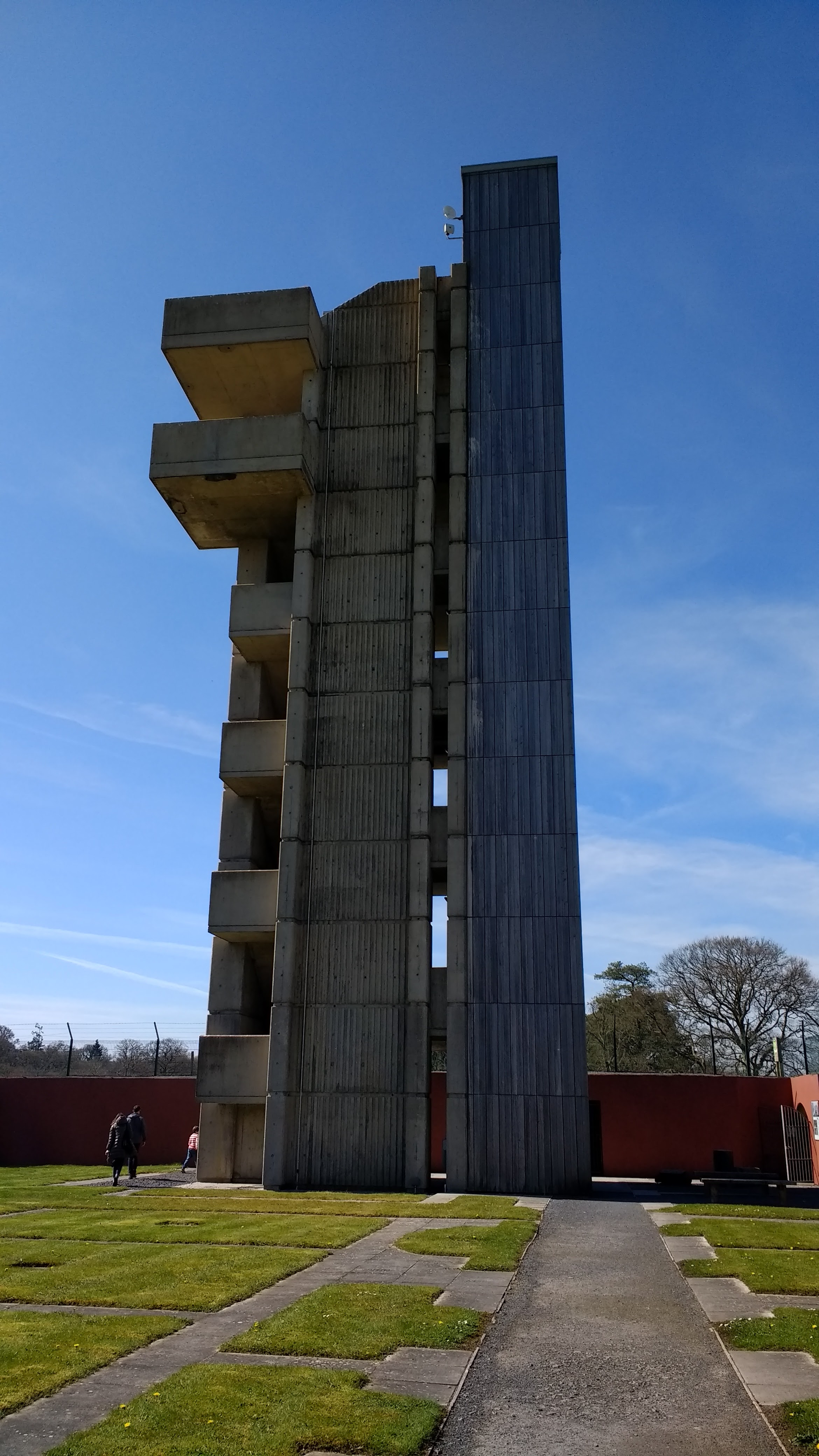
Moylurg tower, a viewing tower at the edge of Lough Key, Roscommon, Ireland. Built on the site of Rockingham House in 1973.

Immediately to the south of the lough is Lough Key Forest Park, a popular destination for recreational walkers. The park, opened in 1972, covers 865 acres (350 ha) formerly part of the Rockingham estate. The Moylurg Tower, a viewing tower built in 1973, stands on the site of the old Rockingham house overlooking the lake to the north and lawns to the south. There are many amenities in the park including boat tours, boats for hire, water activities, camping and caravan park, an outdoor playground and shop. A 2007 development added a number of new attractions including a forest canopy walkway and children's play areas, to cater to the "21st-century visitor".

Sir Cecil Stafford-King-Harman (1895–1987), second (and last) Baronet of Rockingham, ensured that the land went back to the people of Ireland through the Irish Land Commission, who subdivided the pasture land into several farms of approximately 50 acres (20 ha) and granted these to local people. An extensive area around the then-derelict Rockingham house became the Forest Park and this was looked after by the Department of Forestry. It is currently in the care of Coillte, a semi-state body. The park contains the remains of five ring forts, giving evidence of the long habitation of this region.

The area surrounding the lake is significant in medieval Irish literature and legend. Starting around 1000 AD, the Annals of Boyle were compiled on Trinity Island, and from 1253 to 1590 the Annals of Lough Key continued from where the Boyle annals ended. Lough Key was also the site for the legend of Una Bháin. Famed harpist Turlough O'Carolan is buried at Kilronan, three miles (5 km) to the north of the lake.

== Annalistic references ==
From the Annals of the Four Masters:

- M955.11 - The fleet of Fearghal, son of Art, upon Loch-Ce.

== See also ==
- List of loughs in Ireland

== Gallery ==
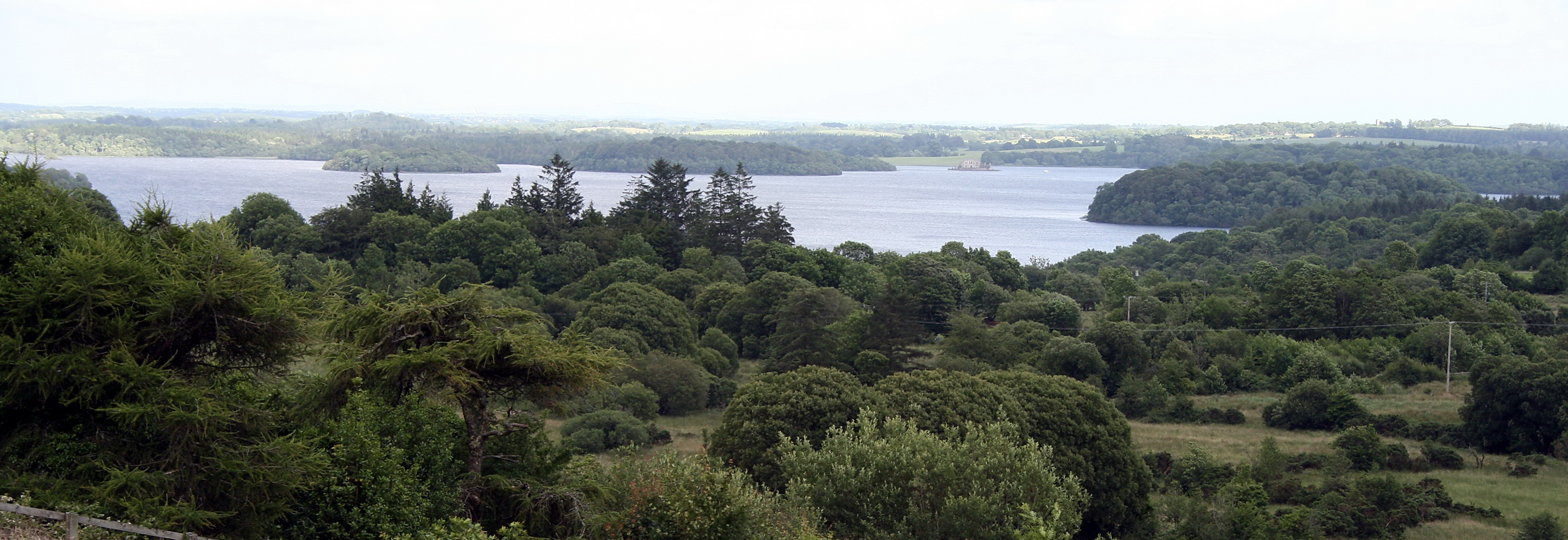

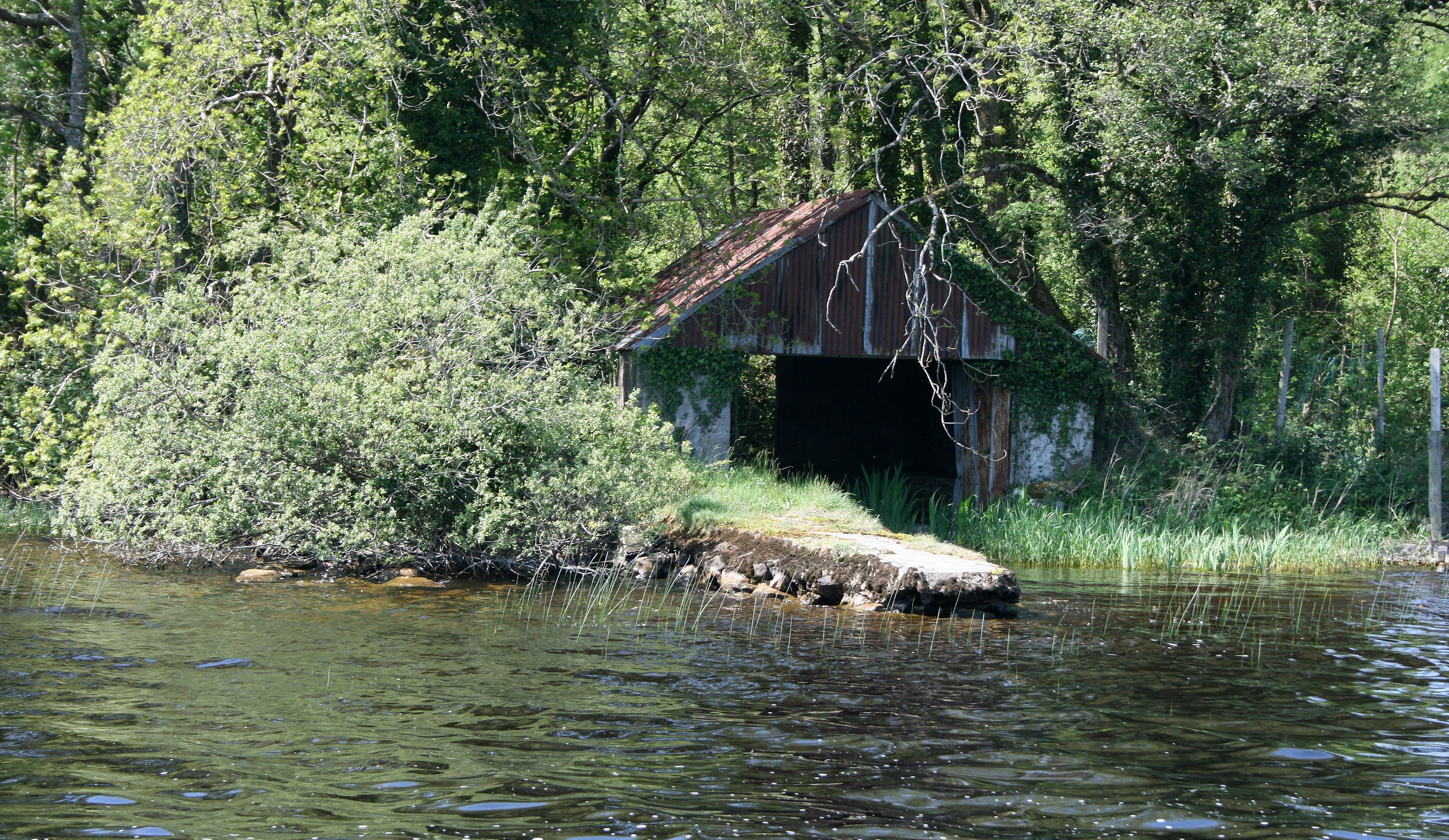

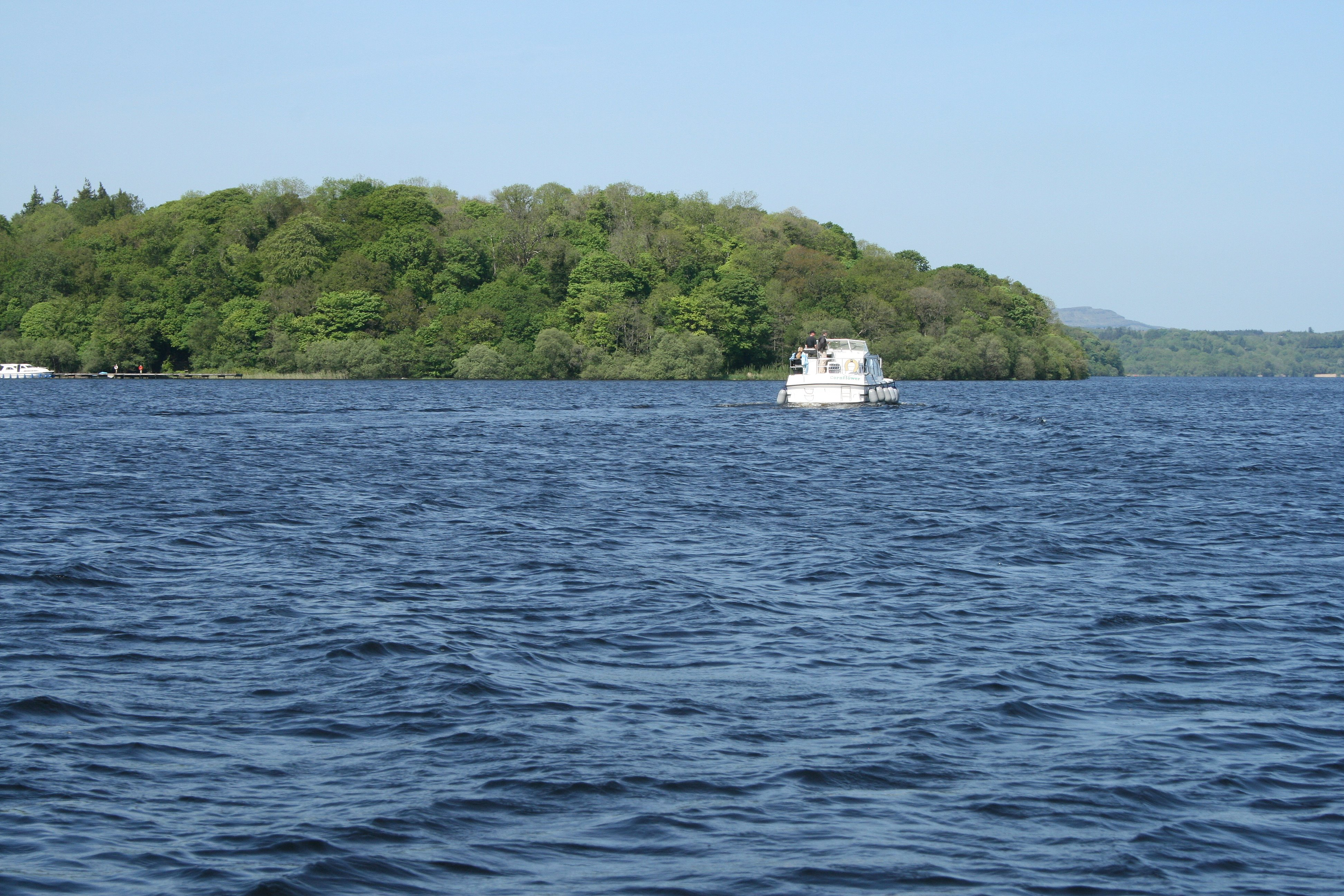
