= Lough Key Forest Park =

Park in County Roscommon, Ireland

Coordinates: 53°59′N 8°15′W

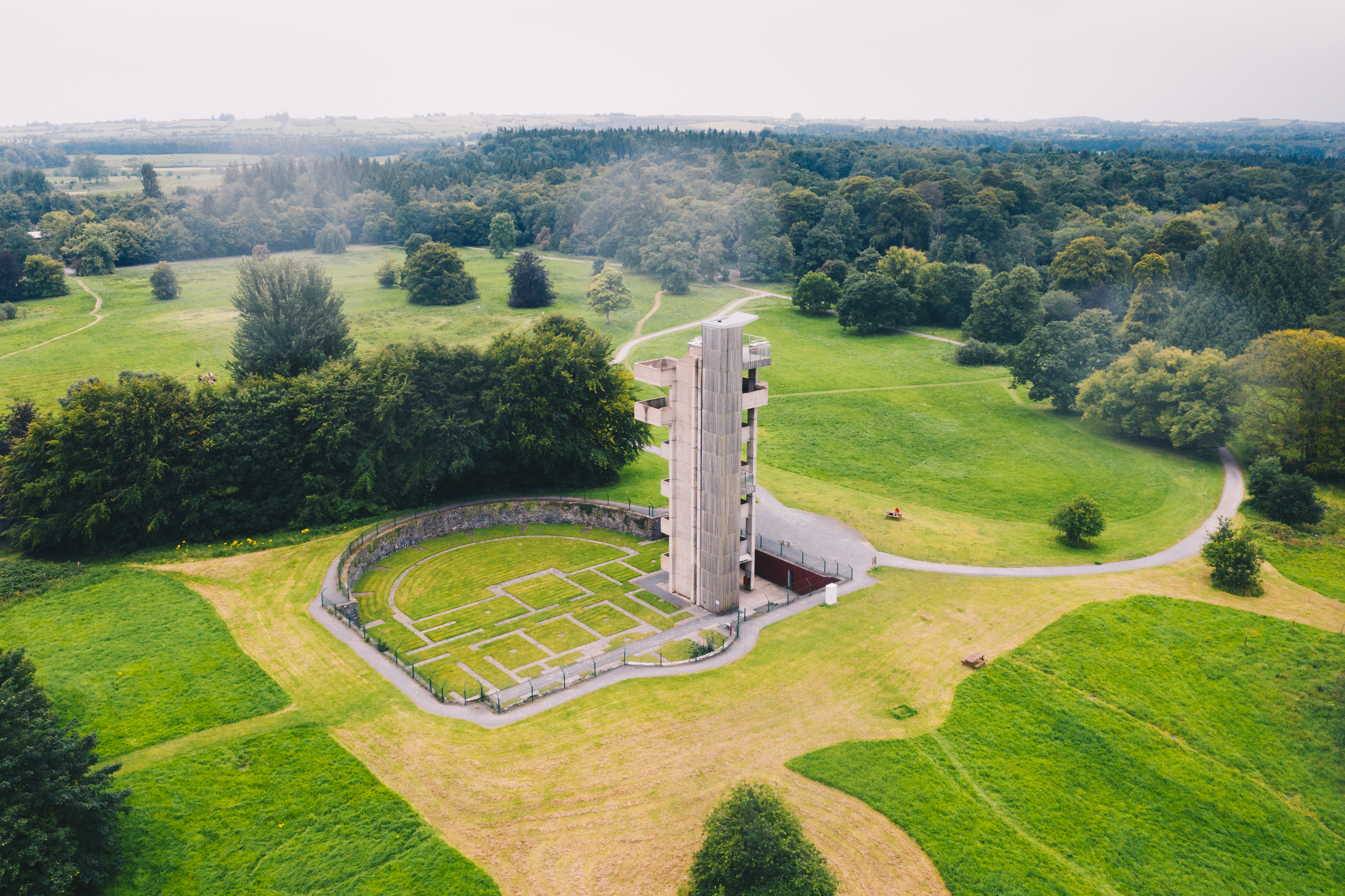
Photo by 4h4.photography

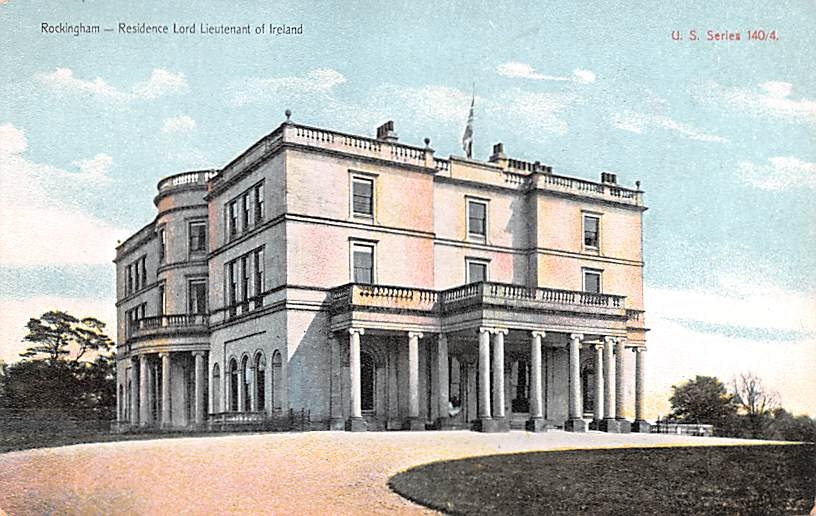
Rockingham House, County Roscommon

Lough Key Forest Park is an 800-hectare park on the southern shore of Lough Key, 40 km south east of Sligo town and 3 km east of Boyle, County Roscommon, Ireland. Formerly part of the Rockingham Estate laid out by the King family, it is open to the public.

== History ==
Rockingham House had burned down in a fire started by an electrical fault in 1957. The house had been designed by John Nash around 1810.

What remained of the estate was sold by Sir Cecil Stafford-King-Harman, to the Irish Land Commission in May 1959. The Land Commission officially took control of the estate in November 1959.

After the ruins of the house were demolished in 1971, the 150 ft (45.72 m) Moylurg Viewing Tower was built on the site in 1973, and designed in the Brutalist architecture style by Irish architect by James Fehily of Fehily and Associates The servant's tunnels still exist, with one entrance near the tower.

== Park ==
The part of the estate that later became Lough Key Forest Park was handed over by the Land Commission to the Forestry Commission around 1972. In 1988, the Forestry Commission became Coillte, a State company. Lough Key Forest Park has been owned and run by Coillte since that time.

The park contains a visitor centre with a restaurant and a number of nature trails and walks including the tree canopy walk, which is a short elevated walkway through the tree canopy and opened in 2007. The forested section of the park contains a mix of non-native evergreen trees and native deciduous trees. In particular, a number of impressive large cedars are found within the park.

The Forest Park also contains a number of attractions, some dating from the time the park was part of the Rockingham Estate, and others from when the park was developed in the 1970s. These include the Ice House, Gazebo, Ruined Church, Stables, Tunnels, the Bog Gardens, Wishing Chair, the Fairy Bridge, Drummans Bridge and the deer paddock. In addition, there are a number of short canals that are lined with walkways.

Drummans Island was a peninsula that was formed into an island by the creation of a short canal and is connected to the remainder of the Park by Drummans Bridge. There are a number of wharves for pleasure cruising boats to moor at the Forest Park, as Lough Key is part of the Shannon Navigation system. The Forest Park is a popular destination for boaters on the Boyle River and wider Shannon system. The park also contains facilities for camping and caravans.

In 2006–7, the Park was redeveloped with the demolition of the original 1970s shop and restaurant complex and its replacement with a new visitor centre. In addition, the Boda Borg adventure house was constructed, along with a children's outdoor playground. The controversial Moylurg Tower, a 'brutalist' concrete observation tower dating from the early 1970s, was refurbished and provided with a passenger lift. The tunnels were also refurbished and lit as part of the redevelopment.

In the years succeeding the Park's redevelopment, a number of further attractions have been established on the grounds. 2011 saw the opening of "Zipit", a series of high-wire courses winding through the canopy of the forest. In 2014, "Woodland Segway" and "Electric Bike Trails" were set up. The former of these two neighbouring businesses provides guided Segway tours of the woods, while the latter permits rental of both electric and regular bicycles to park visitors.

Lough Key Forest Park is one of the biggest tourist attractions in County Roscommon and remains a popular location for day trips.
