= Anthony St Leger (Master of the Rolls) =

English-born judge in Ireland

Sir Anthony St Leger (the younger) (c.1535–1613) was an English-born judge in Ireland of the later Tudor and Stuart eras. He held the office of Master of the Rolls in Ireland.

== Family ==
There is some confusion about his parentage. It is often said that he was the third son of Sir Anthony St Leger, Lord Deputy of Ireland, and his wife Agnes Warham. However, both Burke's Peerage, and Francis Elrington Ball in his definitive study of the pre-Independence Irish judiciary, state that he was the nephew, not the son, of the elder Sir Anthony, and that his parents were Sir Anthony's brother George St Leger and his wife Thomasine Heath.

== Career ==
He was born around 1535, at Leeds, Kent. He entered Gray's Inn in 1562 and was called to the Bar in 1574. He was made an Ancient of Gray's Inn in 1579 and was Reader of the Inn in 1589.

In 1593 he was made Irish Master of the Rolls, with a knighthood. Crawford states that he was chosen for the office because of the Crown's strong preference for sending English judges to Ireland, and because of a belief that the St. Leger family's long association with Ireland fitted him for the task. St Leger himself did not share this belief: he went to Ireland under protest, made regular visits home and petitioned for English offices such as Master of the Court of Requests. His absences from duty were frequent enough to merit an official rebuke: in 1599 the Privy Council of Ireland sent a peremptory order to him to return to Dublin at once since his absence was making the conduct of judicial business almost impossible.

He did not entirely neglect his official duties: he negotiated with Hugh O'Neill, Earl of Tyrone in 1594, was a commissioner for the Plantation of Munster, and went regularly on assize. He was one of a four-member panel of senior officials who served as Commissioners of the Great Seal of Ireland in 1605. In 1607 he was one of four senior judges who became members of the King's Inns, thus helping to revive an institution which had become almost moribund. However his desire to return to England was as strong as ever, and he finally obtained leave to retire in 1609. He continued to advise the Crown on Irish affairs, and died in Cork early in 1613, presumably while on a mission to Ireland. His body was brought back to England and at his own request, he was buried beside his first wife Eleanor in the church of St. Sepulchre-without-Newgate in London. Mary, his second wife, is buried in St. Patrick's Cathedral, Dublin.

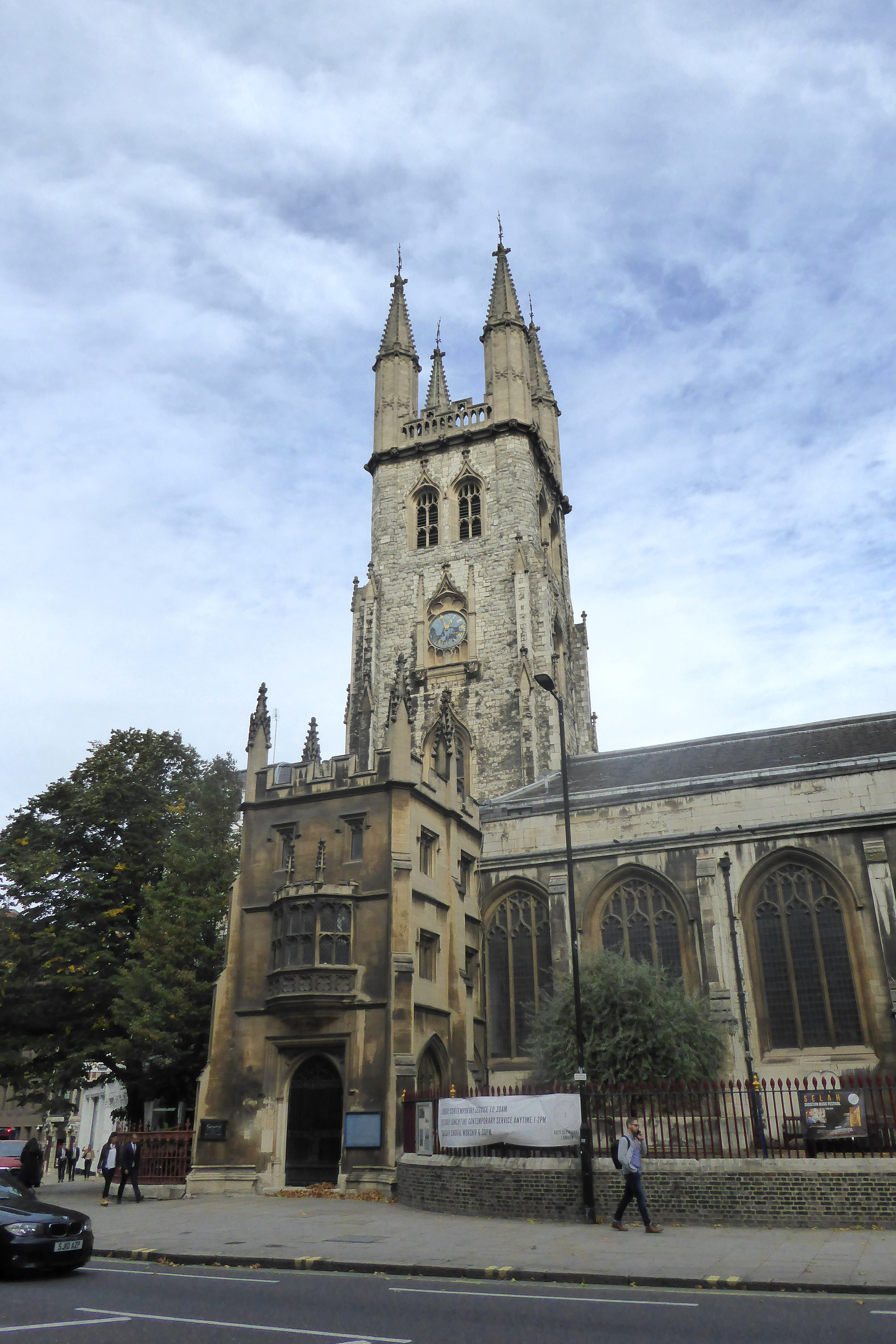
Church of St. Sepulchre-without-Newgate, where St Leger is buried

== Personal life ==
He bought Wierton House, in Boughton Monchelsea in Kent, from the Norton family, and acquired Bobbing Court in Kent through his second marriage to Mary Clifford. His will makes generous provisions for his widow, and contains legacies to his Clifford stepchildren, numerous cousins and the poor of Leeds. Sir Henry Wotton, the noted poet and diplomat, received a bequest of a ring; since St Leger's third wife Aphra was a Wotton there may have been a family connection between the two men.

St Leger married firstly Eleanor, daughter of Richard Markham of Sedgebrook, Lincolnshire; they had one daughter, Joan. Eleanor died in 1599. He married secondly as her fourth husband Mary, daughter of Francis Southwell of Wyndham Hall, Norfolk; her third husband had been the leading soldier Sir Conyers Clifford. They had two children, Anthony and Frances (who lived for only four days). Their son Anthony was knighted in 1627, and died in 1661. After Mary's death in childbirth in 1603 St Leger married Aphra Wotton, who outlived him by many years.
