= Cecil Stafford-King-Harman =

Anglo-Irish landowner and soldier (1895–1987)

Sir Cecil William Francis Stafford-King-Harman, 2nd Baronet (born Cecil Stafford; 6 December 1895 – 1987) was an Anglo-Irish landowner and soldier.

He was born on 6 December 1895, the second son of Sir Thomas Stafford, 1st Baronet and his wife, Frances Agnes, daughter of Edward King-Harman. In 1933 Cecil added his mother's surname to his father's. His elder brother, Edward Charles Stafford King Harman, was killed in the First World War.

Cecil graduated from Oxford, receiving an M.A. in agriculture in 1922. He married Sarah Beatrice Acland, daughter of Alfred Dyke Acland. Their son Thomas Edward Stafford-King-Harman (1921–1944) was killed in the Normandy Campaign. Their daughters were MI6 agent Joan Stafford-King-Harman (1918–2018) and artist Ann Stafford King-Harman (1919–1969). On his father's death in 1935, Cecil succeeded to the baronetcy; it became extinct on his death in 1987.

In 1937, he followed his father as a steward of the Irish Turf Club. He was a member of the Church of Ireland and from 1939 a lay member of the diocesan synod for Kilmore, Elphin and Ardagh. Previously a captain in the yeomanry, during the Second World War Stafford-King-Harman served in the King's Royal Rifle Corps from 7 May 1940 until 2 April 1943, when as temporary lieutenant-colonel he relinquished his command due to ill health and was granted honorary rank of major.

After the death of John Keane in 1956, Seán T. O'Kelly, the President of Ireland, appointed Stafford-King-Harman to the Council of State. The family estate was the Rockingham Estate in the north of County Roscommon. The house was gutted by fire in September 1957 while Stafford-King-Harman was at Doncaster Racecourse. Lacking the funds to rebuild the house, he sold the remaining estate of 2,400 acres (970 ha) at auction in 1959. It was bought by the Land Commission and much of it is now Lough Key Forest Park.

Baronetage of the United Kingdom
Preceded by Thomas Stafford	Baronet (of Rockingham); 1935–1987	Extinct
