= Curlew Mountains =

Mountain range in Ireland

Coordinates: 54°01′0″N 8°18′0″W

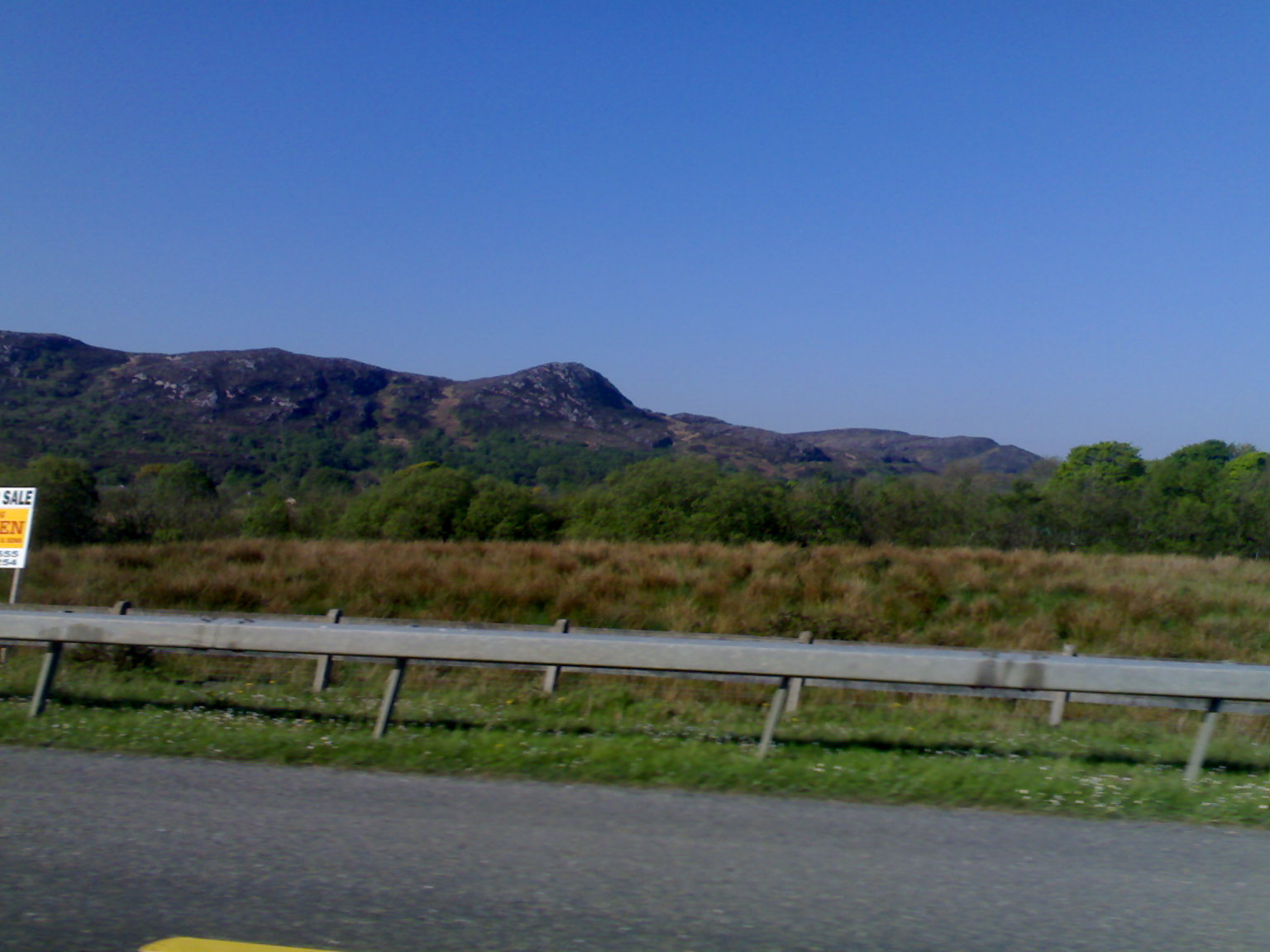
- The Curlew Pass

Highest point
- Elevation: 259 m (850 ft)
- Prominence: 197 m (646 ft)

Geography
- Location: Counties Roscommon & Sligo, Ireland
- Parent range: Curlew Mountains

The Curlew Mountains (Irish: An Corrshliabh, meaning 'the rough or rugged mountain') are a range of low-lying hills situated between Boyle and Castlebaldwin in northeastern Connacht.

== Toponymy ==
The assignation of the name Curlew to the mountains may not relate the Curlew bird, but rather to the Irish: corrshliabh which means "steep-sided pointed mountains".

== Geography ==
Geologically, the Curlew Mountains are made of Devonian sandstone and conglomerate that is harder than the surrounding Carboniferous limestone, hence their appearance as an upland feature.

== History ==
The Battle of Curlew Pass, in which Irish forces led by Red Hugh O'Donnell defeated an English army of about 2000 was fought here on 15 August 1599.
