= Estersnow =

Administrative territory in County, Roscommon, Ireland

Coordinates: 53°56′0″N 8°06′40″W

Estersnow more commonly Eastersnow and less commonly Easter-Snow is a civil parish in the ancient barony of Boyle in County Roscommon, Ireland. It is 1295 hectares in area and contains the old churchyard. The area is mostly farmland but also contains the cavetown Loughs.
