= Rockingham Estate =

Rockingham House
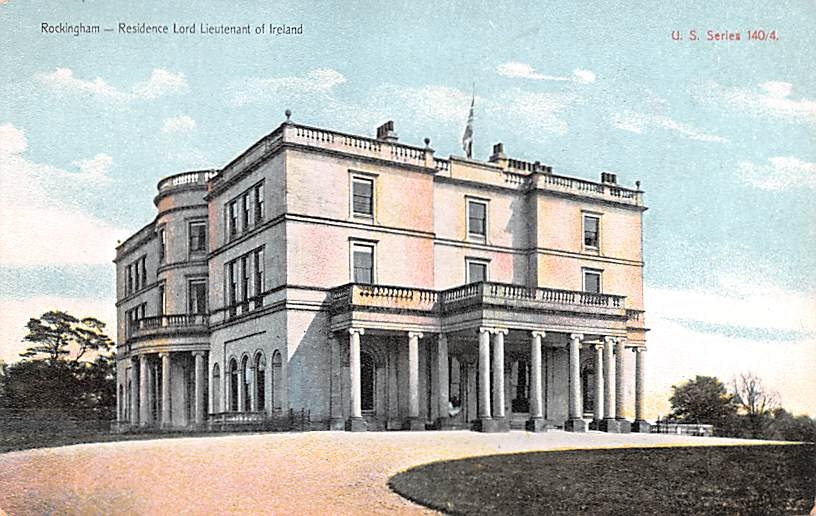
- An illustration of the house from a postcard around 1905.

- Location within Ireland

General information
- Status: Private dwelling house
- Type: House
- Architectural style: Georgian, Regency, classical
- Classification: Demolished
- Location: Boyle, County Roscommon, Ireland
- Coordinates: 53.985709°N 8.237224°W
- Construction started: 1809
- Estimated completion: 1810
- Renovated: 1822 - dome removed and third floor added
- Demolished: Fire (1957), Demolition (1971)

Technical details
- Floor count: 2 over basement (1810), 3rd floor (1822)

Design and construction
- Architects: John Nash (1809-10) and James Pain
- Developer: Robert King, 1st Viscount Lorton
- Quantity surveyor: John Lynn (clerk)

The Rockingham Estate was a country estate near Boyle in the north of County Roscommon in the west of Ireland. The former Rockingham Demesne, which included Rockingham House, covered much of the area that now makes up Lough Key Forest Park.

== History ==
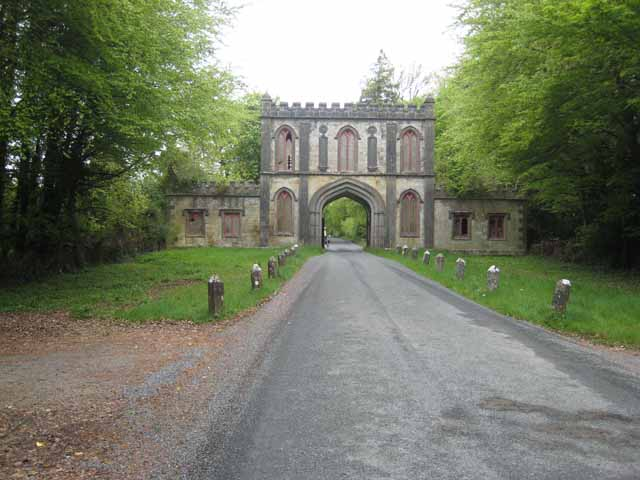
Gatehouse to the Rockingham Demesne.

In 1771, the King family moved from King House, their home in the town of Boyle, to the newly-built Kingston Hall on what later became the Rockingham Estate. The footprint and walled gardens of this house still exist and indicate its substantial size. It was later referred to as Kingston Lodge or the Steward's Lodge.

Rockingham House was later developed for the 1st Viscount Lorton and it was designed by one of the preeminent architects of the day, John Nash, around 1809–10. The planned gardens were designed by John Sutherland around the same time and included servants' tunnels, follies, lodges and miniature castles.

In 1822, a third storey was added to the house and the grand dome was removed, significantly distorting Nash's original design.

A number of other notable structures were also built on the estate around the same time including stables (1845) and a later gothic lodge and entrance gate.

The house was severely damaged in a fire in 1860 and was at that stage largely rebuilt.

In 1903, Rockingham House was leased by the 2nd Earl of Dudley, who served as the Lord Lieutenant of Ireland from 11 August 1902 to 11 December 1905.

In 1918, the house was raided by Irish Republican Brotherhood (IRB) members in order to procure arms.

Rockingham House again burned down in a fire started by an electrical fault in 1957.

What remained of the estate was sold by Sir Cecil Stafford-King-Harman to the Irish Land Commission in May 1959. The Land Commission officially took control of the estate in November 1959.

The remains of the house were finally demolished in 1971.

In 1973, a brutalist concrete viewing tower known as the Moylurg Tower was built on the site of Rockingham House.

== See also ==
- McDermott's Castle
