= Robert King =

Robert, Rob, Robbie, Bob, or Bobby King may refer to:

== Arts and entertainment ==
=== Music ===
- Robert A. King (composer) (1862–1932), American composer who wrote under pseudonyms including Mary Earl and Betty Chapin
- Bobby King (musician) (1941–1983), American blues guitarist and singer
- Bobby King (born 1944), American singer
- Robbie King (musician) (1947–2003), Canadian musician
- Robert King (conductor) (born 1960), English founder and conductor of the period music orchestra The King's Consort
- Bob King (children's musician) (fl. 1970s), Canadian children's musician and songwriter
- Rob King (born 1970), American composer

=== Photography and publishing ===
- Bob King (editor) (born 1949), American editor-manager of Classic Images and Films of the Golden Age
- Bob P. King (born 1953), American photographer, writer, and amateur astronomer
- Bob King (photographer), rock music photographer, collaborator with Glenn A. Baker
- Robert King (writer) (born 1955), American screenwriter and producer; co-creator of the TV series The Good Wife
- Robert King (photojournalist) (born 1969), American independent photojournalist
- J. Robert King, American novelist and game designer

=== Film and television ===
- Robert King (writer) (born 1959), American film and television writer, director and producer

== Law and politics ==
=== American ===
- Robert Emmet King (1848–1921), mayor of Louisville, Kentucky (1896)
- Robert T. King (Vermont politician) (1917–1970), Vermont Republican politician
- Robert Bruce King (born 1940), American judge
- Robert R. King (born 1942), American politician; United States special envoy for North Korean Human Rights Issues 2009
- Robert L. King (born 1946), American political figure

=== Australian ===
- Robert John King (1839–1899), Australian politician
- Robert King (Queensland politician) (1848–1905), member of the Queensland Legislative Assembly
- Robert Arthur King (1886–1960), Australian politician
- Robert King (Victorian politician) (1920–1991), Australian politician
- Bob King (Queensland politician) (born 1938), Australian politician

=== British ===
- Robert King (jurist) (1600–1676), English jurist and academic

=== Irish ===
- Robert King (Roundhead) (c. 1599–1657), Irish soldier and statesman
- Robert King, 2nd Baron Kingston (died 1693), Irish nobleman
- Sir Robert King, 1st Baronet (died 1707), Anglo-Irish politician
- Robert King, 1st Baron Kingsborough (1724–1755), Irish landowner and politician
- Robert King, 2nd Earl of Kingston (1754–1799), Anglo-Irish peer
- Robert King, 1st Viscount Lorton (1773–1854), Irish peer and politician
- Robert King, 4th Earl of Kingston (1796–1867), Irish peer, soldier and Whig politician
- Robert King, 6th Earl of Kingston (1804–1869), Anglo-Irish politician and peer

== Religion ==
- Robert King (bishop) (died 1558), English churchman and bishop of Oxford
- Robert King (dean of Kildare) (1723–1787), Irish Anglican priest
- Robert King (archdeacon of Kilmacduagh) (fl. 1815–1830), Anglican Archdeacon in Ireland
- Robert King (church historian) (1815–1900), Irish clergyman, schoolteacher and church historian

== Sports ==
=== Association football (soccer) ===
- Robert King (footballer) (1862–1950), English international footballer
- Bob King (New Zealand footballer) (fl. 1948), New Zealand international football (soccer) player
- Robbie King (footballer) (born 1986), English footballer

=== Cricket ===
- Robert Turner King (1824–1884), English cricketer
- Jasper King (Robert Jasper Stuart King, 1909–1992), English cricketer
- Robert King (cricketer, born 1978), English cricketer

=== Other sports ===
- Robert A. King (American football) (fl. 1890), American football coach
- Bob King (Australian footballer) (1894–1979), Australian rules football player
- Bob King (high jumper) (1906–1965), American high jumper
- Bob King (American football coach) (1913–1994), active 1958–1972
- Bob King (basketball) (1923–2004), American basketball coach in 1960s and 1970s
- Bob King (bowls) (1934–2022), Australian lawn bowler
- Robbie King (darts player) (born 1993), Australian darts player

== Others ==
- Robert King (British Army officer) (1904–1983), British general
- Robert Hillary King (born 1942), American Black Panther member and activist
- Bob King (labor leader) (born 1946), American president of the UAW, 2010–2014
- Robert King (economist) (born 1951), American economist

== See also ==
- Bert King (disambiguation)
