= Edward King (Royal Navy officer, born 1774) =

Captain Edward King (9 June 1774 – 25 September 1807) was a Royal Navy officer who represented County Roscommon for several years in the United Kingdom Parliament.

King was the third son of Robert King, 2nd Earl of Kingston and the younger brother of George King, 3rd Earl of Kingston and Robert King, 1st Viscount Lorton. He was educated at Eton from 1781 to 1788 and at Harrow in 1789. He entered the Royal Navy and was commissioned a lieutenant on 12 June 1796. From May to August 1801, he commanded the brig-sloop Charger.

King's family was one of several with electoral interests in County Roscommon. In 1799, their rivals, the pro-Unionist Mahons, had used his brother Robert's anti-Union stance to obtain the Lord Lieutenant's backing against him and take the County Roscommon seat in the Parliament of Ireland at a by-election for Lt.-Col. Thomas Mahon, eldest son of the family. After the Union, the administration wished to remain on good terms with the Kings; they declined to support Mahon, and Edward was returned at the 1802 election without a contest.

He was promoted commander on 29 April 1802, and commanded the ship-sloop Argus from June 1803 until becoming post-captain on 8 May 1804. In 1805, he took command of the sixth-rate Ariadne. He had recently returned to Ariadne, on blockading duty off of Gravelines, when the Dutch flotilla joining the proposed invasion of England broke out of Dunkirk on 17 July 1805, making for Boulogne. Ariadne and her consorts drove three or four of the thirty-two gun-vessels ashore, but they were badly outgunned by the shore forts and the four prams accompanying the gun-vessels. The Ariadne's squadron was joined early in the morning of the 18th by the frigate Vestal, which had heard the firing, and they renewed the attack on the flotilla off Calais, without notable results.

Early in 1806, King was appointed to command the frigate HMS Alexandria. His elder brothers put him forward again that year as a candidate for Roscommon, although he was away at sea escorting convoys. The Mahon interest had revived, and Lord Hartland put up his second son, Col. Stephen Mahon, as a candidate. Mahon's interest proved too strong, and King withdrew from the contest without a poll. King died on 25 September 1807 at a naval hospital in St Ann's, Barbados, and was buried at St Michael's.

Parliament of the United Kingdom
Preceded by Arthur French; Hon. Thomas Mahon	Member of Parliament for County Roscommon; 1802–1806; With: Arthur French	Succeeded by Arthur French; Hon. Stephen Mahon
