= Gerard Lowther (judge) =

Irish justice (1589–1660)

Sir Gerard Lowther (c. 1589–1660), sometimes referred to as Gerald Lowther, was a member of the well-known Lowther family of Westmoreland. He had a distinguished judicial career in Ireland, becoming Chief Justice of the Irish Common Pleas, although his enemies claimed his success was due to a complete lack of moral principles.

== Origins ==
He was born in Westmorland, and was undoubtedly a member of the leading landowning family of Lowther, although his exact relationship to the family is unclear. Sir Gerard Lowther senior (died 1624) and his brother Sir Lancelot Lowther, who were both High Court judges in Ireland, acknowledged him as their nephew. It is generally thought that he was the illegitimate son of their eldest brother Sir Christopher Lowther (1557–1617) in which case he should not be confused with Christopher's legitimate son Gerald, by his second wife Eleanor Musgrave. This Gerald was a professional soldier who joined the Polish army and died fighting against the Ottoman Empire. Sir Christopher and his brothers were the sons of Sir Richard Lowther (1532–1607) and his wife Frances Middleton. Sir Richard's reputation for long and loyal service to the English Crown was damaged by his adherence for a time to the cause of Mary Queen of Scots, although he managed to avoid permanent disgrace.

== Early career ==
Gerard matriculated from Queen's College, Oxford in 1605, entered Gray's Inn in 1608 and was called to the Bar in 1616. No doubt because he had relatives on the Irish Bench, he was called to the Irish Bar three years later.

The Lowthers were supporters of the "Great Earl", Richard Boyle, 1st Earl of Cork, the dominant Irish magnate of his time, and ties were strengthened when in 1621 Gerald married Anne Parsons, daughter of Sir Lawrence Parsons, the Earl's legal adviser. Gerald succeeded to the role of legal adviser to the Earl, and followed his father-in-law as Attorney-General for Munster in 1621 and to the bench as Baron of the Court of Exchequer (Ireland) in 1628. He was knighted in 1631. He became a substantial landowner, with his main estates in County Wexford and County Fermanagh. In 1624 he inherited considerable property from his uncle and namesake Sir Gerard, who amassed a fortune but died childless. He lived mainly at Oxmantown near Dublin. He accumulated money as well as land, and was able to lend James Butler, 1st Duke of Ormonde, £1000, a very substantial amount in the seventeenth century.

In 1633 Dominick Sarsfield, 1st Viscount Sarsfield, the Chief Justice of Common Pleas, was removed from office for corruption, and the Earl of Cork is said to have paid a thousand pounds to secure the place for Lowther. As Thomas Wentworth, 1st Earl of Strafford, the Lord Lieutenant of Ireland, assumed complete control of the Irish administration Lowther, despite the increasing hostility between Strafford and the Earl of Cork, became one of Strafford's chief assistants, and largely broke his ties with Lord Cork. In 1640 he became Attorney-General to the Irish Court of Wards, while retaining office as Chief Justice.

== Downfall of Lord Chancellor Loftus ==
During the protracted struggle for political supremacy between Strafford and Adam Loftus, 1st Viscount Loftus, the Lord Chancellor of Ireland, Lowther and his fellow Chief Justices, as members of the Privy Council of Ireland, gave their full support to Strafford, and Loftus was removed from office and imprisoned. On being released Loftus went to London to appeal to King Charles I for his reinstatement. Lowther accompanied Strafford there to argue the opposing case, which he did with such skill that Strafford said: I shall be beholden to you as long as I live.

== Civil War ==
The attainder and execution of Strafford in May 1641 led to Lowther, recognised as one of his staunchest adherents, along with the Lord Chancellor Sir Richard Bolton, being impeached by the Irish Parliament and dismissed from the Privy Council; Strafford in his last days is said to have interceded for them with the King. Lowther was soon acquitted of treason and released from custody, and thereafter he played a careful double game in politics. He was restored to the council, and attended the King at Oxford in connection with the negotiations with the Irish Confederates in 1644, although his noted antipathy to the Confederates limited his usefulness.

In 1646, he was sent to London to negotiate with Parliament for the relief of Dublin and soon afterwards he abandoned the Royalist cause. In 1647 he assured Parliament of his loyalty and acted as receiver of delinquents' estates. He returned to Ireland in 1651 and acted as president of the High Court of Justice 1652–54; at the trial for treason of the Confederate leader Sir Phelim O'Neill it was noted that he referred to Charles II simply as "Charles Stuart".

In 1655, on account of his long experience, and good services to the Cromwellian regime, he was made Chief Justice of the Lower Bench (in effect the same office he had previously held) and a Commissioner of the Great Seal, and was much in favour with Henry Cromwell.

== Death ==
At the Restoration, those judges who had served under the Commonwealth were generally treated with leniency, and some of them even retained office. In the event it was not necessary for the new Government to take any decision on Lowther's future: he was old and unwell, and died in the spring of 1660. He was buried in St. Michan's Church.

== Family ==
Lowther married firstly Anne Parsons, daughter of Sir Lawrence Parsons of Birr Castle, the judge of Irish Admiralty Court and Baron of the Court of Exchequer (Ireland) and his wife Anne Malham; she died in 1634. Lowther and Parsons had close ties: each served as MP for Tallow, as Attorney General for Munster and as a Baron of the Exchequer, and both were clients of the Earl of Cork. He remained on good terms with Anne's family after her death: her mother, who died in 1646, appointed him one of the executors of her will, and left legacies to him and his second wife.

He was remarried the following year to Margaret King, daughter of Sir John King of Boyle Abbey, MP for County Roscommon and Clerk of the Crown and Hanaper, and his wife Catherine Drury, daughter of Robert Drury, and grand-niece of Sir William Drury, President of Munster. Margaret was a sister of Sir Robert King of Boyle Abbey, the poet Edward King (the subject of Lycidas by John Milton) and the writer Dorothy Durie. Like her sisters, Dorothy and Mary, Lady Charlemont, Margaret is said to have been a woman of considerable learning. She died in 1658.

A son was born to his first marriage but must have died young since historians agree that he had no surviving issue.

== Character ==
Lowther was a gifted lawyer and a shrewd and adaptable politician, but historians, in general, have had little good to say of him. O'Flanagan calls him "a most unprincipled man". Smyth says "He acquired a large landed property by steering with unprincipled craft through the boisterous ocean of contemporary troubles". Wedgwood, on the other hand, states that while he may have owed his rise to high office to patronage and a certain lack of scruples, he was well qualified by legal ability and strength of character for it.

== See also ==
- Lowther Baronets
- Richard Lowther (1532-1608)
