= Henry King-Tenison, 8th Earl of Kingston =

Irish army officer and peer (1848–1896)

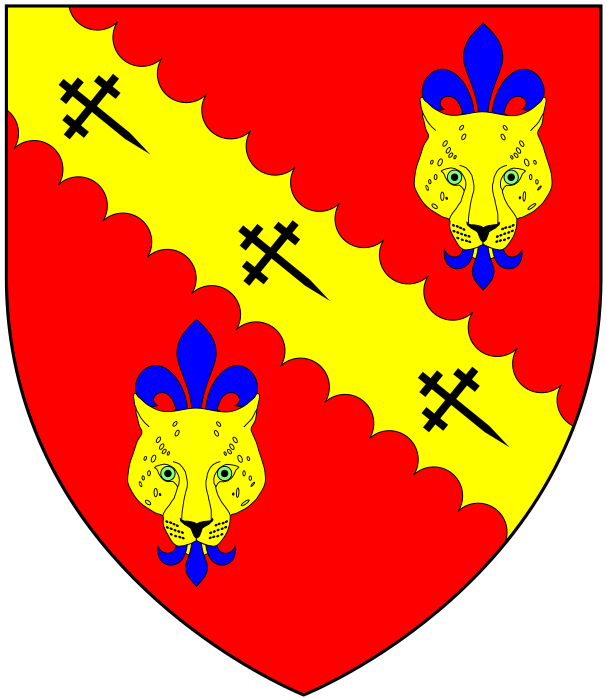
Arms of Tenison (Gules, on a bend engrailed or between two leopard's faces of the last jessant-de-lys azure three crosses crosslet fitchée sable), as assumed by royal licence 10 March 1883 by Henry Ernest Newcomen King-Tenison, 8th Earl of Kingston, when he also adopted the additional surname of Tenison, following his marriage.

Lieutenant-Colonel Henry Ernest Newcomen King-Tenison, 8th Earl of Kingston (31 July 1848 – 13 January 1896), was an Irish peer and Conservative politician.

== Early life and education ==
He was born Henry King on 31 July 1848 to Anne King, née Gore-Booth, wife of Robert King, elder son and heir of the 1st Viscount Lorton (a younger son of the 2nd Earl of Kingston). By the mid-1830s, Robert King had suffered a stroke and the effects of his heavy drinking, and was "almost entirely under the influence of his wife", whose "high-living" was disliked by his father, Lord Lorton. He publicly disowned the child, as since 1846 his wife had been the lover of "dubious and insolvent French nobleman" Vicomte Ernest Valentin de Satgé St Jean. Robert King's attempt to sue for divorce in 1850 failed due to his own extramarital affair, with his nursemaid and travelling companion Julie Imhoff, being established. Robert King succeeded as 2nd Viscount Lorton on his father's death in 1854, and as 6th Earl of Kingston on the death of his cousin the 5th Earl in 1869, but died just over a month later. Henry King's elder brother, also Robert King, Viscount Kingsborough, succeeded as 7th Earl.

King's "legitimacy was confirmed (as it could not be disproved) at the probate court in Dublin in 1870", meaning he succeeded as 8th Earl of Kingston in 1871 on his brother's death, but the family's "disastrously dispersed hereditary lands" did not come to him with the title, the Kings having been "driven to extraordinary lengths" to prevent the 6th Earl's estranged wife and her French lover from gaining possession of their property.

King was educated at Rugby School in Warwickshire.

== Career ==
King-Tenison served in the 5th Battalion, Connaught Rangers, reaching the rank of lieutenant-colonel. From 1887 to 1896, he was Irish representative peer in the House of Lords and from 1888 to 1896 Lord Lieutenant of Roscommon.

== Philately ==
A philatelist, he exhibited his postage stamp collection of Great Britain at the London Philatelic Exhibition 1890 for which he was awarded a gold medal. From 1892 to 1896, he served as President of the Philatelic Society London.

== Personal life ==
On 23 January 1872, at St James's, Westminster, King married Florence Margaret, the daughter of Lieutenant-Colonel Edward King-Tenison, of Kilronan Castle, county Roscommon. She was his father's second cousin, both descending from Edward King, 1st Earl of Kingston. After their marriage, his name was changed to Henry Newcomen King-Tenison by Royal Licence on 10 March 1883. The couple lived at Kilronan Castle, which he considerably enlarged in the 1880s. King-Tenison died at Cairo aged 47. He was succeeded as 10th Earl of Kingston by his son Henry Edwyn King-Tenison.

Political offices
Preceded by The Viscount Doneraile	Representative peer for Ireland; 1887–1896	Succeeded by The Earl of Portarlington
Honorary titles
Preceded by Edward Robert King-Harman	Lord Lieutenant of Roscommon; 1888–1896	Succeeded by The O'Conor Don
Peerage of Ireland
Preceded by Robert King	Earl of Kingston; 1871–1896	Succeeded by Henry King-Tenison
