= Custos Rotulorum of Roscommon =

Custos rotulorum (plural: custodes rotulorum; Latin for "keeper of the rolls") is the keeper of a county's records and, by virtue of that office, the highest civil officer in the county.

This is a list of people who have served as Custos Rotulorum of County Roscommon.

- Robert King, 1st Baron Kingsborough (died 1755)
- 1772–1797: Edward King, 1st Earl of Kingston
- 1797–1799: Robert King, 2nd Earl of Kingston
- 1806–>1819: Robert King, 1st Viscount Lorton (died 1854)

For post-1831 custodes rotulorum, see Lord Lieutenant of Roscommon
