= Maurice Mahon =

Maurice Mahon may refer to:

- Maurice Mahon, 1st Baron Hartland (1738–1819), Irish politician and landowner
- Maurice Mahon, 3rd Baron Hartland (1772–1845), Church of Ireland clergyman and Irish peer
