= Ferrall =

Ferrall is a surname of Irish origin, presumably an anglicised form of the patronym Ó Fearghail, meaning "descendant of Fearghal", whose name means "man of valour".

== People with the surname ==
- Sir Connell Ferrall, Irish Jacobite soldier killed in 1689
- Scott Ferrall, American sports talk radio personality
- R. Michael Ferrall, American politician and member of the Wisconsin State Assembly
- Sir Raymond Ferrall, Australian businessman and first-class cricketer
- William J. Ferrall, New York politician
