= Arthur French =

Arthur French may refer to:

- Arthur French (actor) (1931–2021), American actor and director
- Arthur French (politician) (1764–1820), MP for the Irish constituency of Roscommon, 1801–1821
- Arthur French, 1st Baron de Freyne (1786–1856), United Kingdom Member of Parliament for Roscommon, 1821–1832
