= Baron Hartland =

Baron Hartland, of Strokestown in the County of Roscommon, was a title in the Peerage of Ireland. It was created on 30 July 1800 for Maurice Mahon, who had earlier represented County Roscommon in the Irish House of Commons. He was the son of Thomas Mahon, who also represented this constituency in the Irish Parliament, grandson of John Mahon and great-grandson of Captain Nicholas Mahon.

Lord Hartland was succeeded by his son, the second Baron. He represented County Roscommon in both the Irish and British Parliaments. The title became extinct on the death of the third Baron on 11 November 1845.

== Barons Hartland (1800) ==
- Maurice Mahon, 1st Baron Hartland (1738–1819)
- Thomas Mahon, 2nd Baron Hartland (1766–1835)
- Maurice Mahon, 3rd Baron Hartland (1772–1845)
