= John King (died 1637) =

Anglo-Irish administrator, politician and landowner (c.1560–1637)

Sir John King (c.1560 – 4 January 1637) was an Anglo-Irish administrator, politician and landowner. He sat in the Irish House of Commons and was a member of the Privy Council of Ireland. He was one of the most valued Irish Crown servants of his generation. Several of his children were notable in their own right. He was the ancestor of the Earl of Kingston.

== Career ==
His background and parentage are obscure, but he is generally thought to have been born in Yorkshire, probably at Northallerton. He is first heard of in Ireland in 1585 as secretary to Sir Richard Bingham, Lord President of Connaught. For his good services to the English Crown, Elizabeth I rewarded him with the lease of Boyle Abbey and the office of Constable of Boyle, in which capacity he commanded a small garrison. John began the construction of the castle at Boyle, and the settlement of the surrounding district. The King family was associated with the town of Boyle for centuries. John seems to have divided his time between Boyle and a house in Dublin near Baggotrath Castle, on present-day Baggot Street.

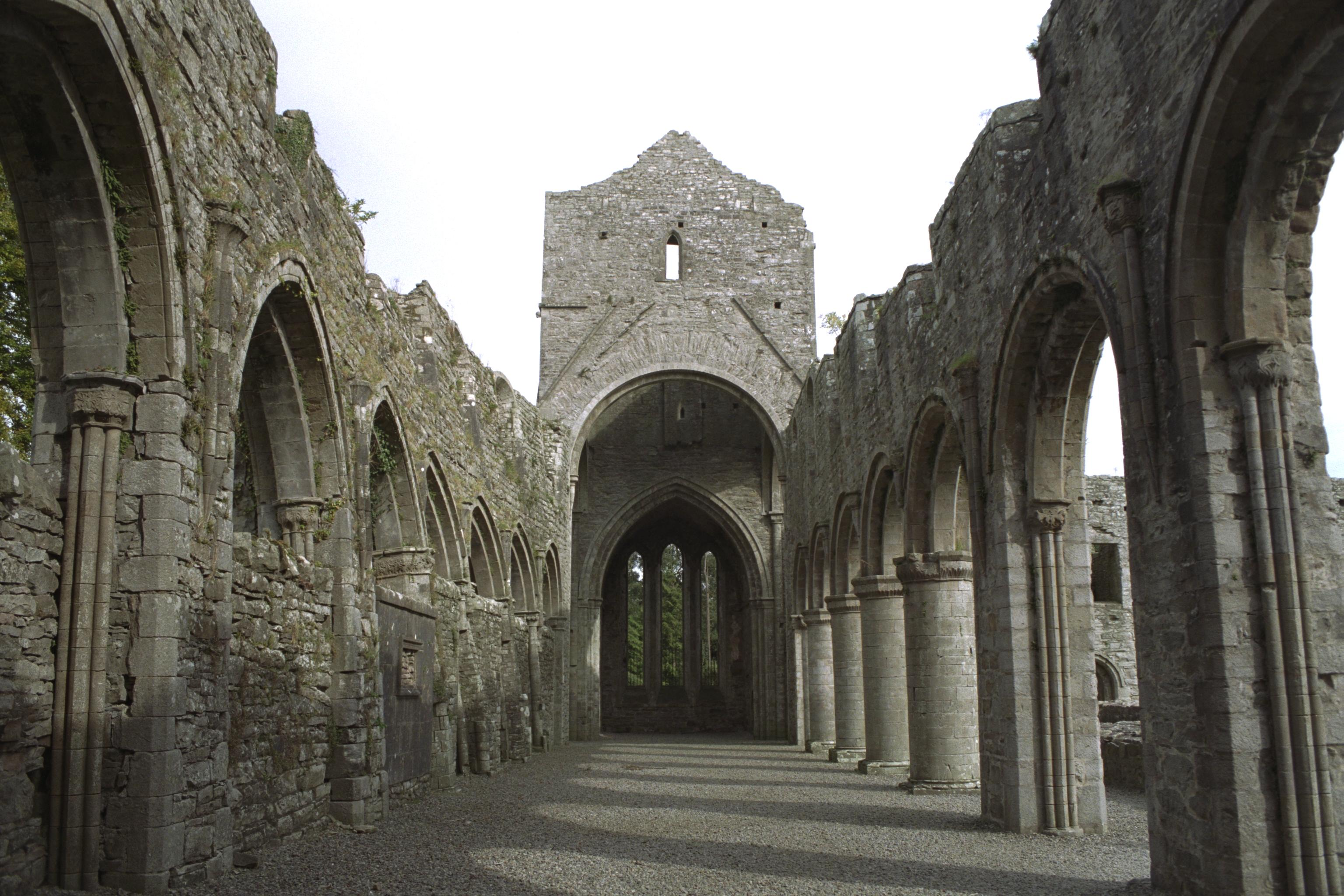
Boyle Abbey, which John King leased from the Crown

Under King James I, having gained the reputation of being an exceptionally useful and versatile public servant, John held many profitable offices, and by the end of his life, he owned land in twenty-one counties.

From 1603, he held the office of Clerk of the Crown and Hanaper for life: from 1606 he held it jointly with Francis Edgeworth, ancestor of the celebrated Edgeworth family of Edgeworthstown, whose most famous member was the novelist Maria Edgeworth. In 1603, he also became Receiver of revenues, and subsequently Deputy Vice-Treasurer of Ireland. He became Muster-master for Ireland and Clerk of the Cheque in 1609, with a reversion in favour of his eldest son Robert, and a Commissioner for Compositions in 1611. He sat on commissions for the Plantation of County Wexford and County Longford. He became a Commissioner of the Irish Court of Wards in 1611. He sat on the Council of Munster, and at different times was authorised to act as temporary governor of Connacht, Leinster and Ulster.

He was knighted and sworn in as a member of the Privy Council in 1609. In the Parliament of Ireland of 1613-15, he was one of the two MPs for County Roscommon.

== Marriage and children ==
He married, before 1599, Catherine Drury, daughter of Robert Drury and Elizabeth Carew. Robert was the son of Edmund Drury, and nephew of Sir William Drury, President of Munster, and had come with his uncle William to Ireland and settled there. Elizabeth Carew's background is obscure, although she appears to have been born at Old Leighlin in County Carlow; her father's name is variously given as George and Thomas.

Catherine King died in 1617. She and John had nine children, several of them distinguished: all three of his daughters, especially Dorothy, are said to have been exceptionally well-educated women for their time.

His children included:

- Sir Robert King MP (died 1657);
- Edward King (1612-1637), the poet and friend of John Milton, who wrote Lycidas in his memory after his early death from drowning;
- John King, who married Margaret Edgeworth (died 1676), daughter of Francis Edgeworth, his father's colleague in the Hanaper office, and Jane Tuite; after his death, she remarried John Bysse, Chief Baron of the Irish Exchequer, by whom she had numerous children, most of whom died young;
- Dorothy Dury (c.1613-1664), a noted writer on the education of women; she married firstly Arthur Moore, a younger son of Garret Moore, 1st Viscount Moore, and secondly the leading Scots Calvinist preacher John Dury;
- Mary King (died July/August 1663), who married William Caulfeild, 2nd Baron Charlemont;
- Margaret King (died 1658), who married Sir Gerard Lowther, Chief Justice of the Irish Common Pleas.

== Death ==
He died at Lichfield, Staffordshire in January 1637. His body was brought back to Boyle for burial, apparently against his own wish, which was to be buried in Lichfield.

== Sources ==
- Burke's Peerage, edited by Charles Mosley; 106th edition Reprinted Switzerland 1999
- Cokayne, G.E. Complete Peerage: Reprinted Gloucester 6 volumes 2000
- Lee, Sidney, ed. (1892). "King, John (d.1637)" . Dictionary of National Biography. Vol. 31. London: Smith, Elder & Co.
