= Edward King (English poet) =

British poet

Edward King (1612 – 10 August 1637) is the subject of John Milton's poem "Lycidas".

King was born in Ireland in 1612, the son of Sir John King, a member of a Yorkshire family who had migrated to Ireland, and Catherine Drury (died 1617), daughter of Robert Drury and a grand-niece of Sir William Drury, Lord President of Munster. Sir John was Clerk of the Crown and Hanaper and MP for County Roscommon, a valued servant of the Crown and a major landowner. Edward was one of nine children: his siblings included Sir Robert King of Boyle Abbey and the writer Dorothy Dury.

Edward King was admitted a pensioner of Christ's College, Cambridge, on 9 June 1626, and four years later was elected a fellow. Milton, though two years his senior and himself anxious to secure a fellowship, became his close friend as well as his rival. King served from 1633 to 1634 as praelector and tutor of his college, and was to have entered the church.

His career, however, was cut short by the tragedy which inspired Milton's verse. In 1637 he set out for Ireland to visit his family, but the ship in which he was sailing struck a rock near the Welsh coast, and King was drowned. Of his own writings many Latin poems contributed to different collections of Cambridge verse survive, but they are not of sufficient merit to explain the esteem in which he was held.
