= General Mahon =

General Mahon may refer to:

- Bryan Mahon (1862–1930), British Army general
- James Patrick Mahon (1800–1891), Irish-born mercenary appointed a general for government forces in the Uruguayan Civil War
- Thomas Mahon, 2nd Baron Hartland (1766–1835), British Army lieutenant general

== See also ==
- William Mahone (1826–1895), Confederate States Army major general
