= Gelasius =

Gelasius is a masculine given name, from Greek Γελάσιος (Gelásios), from Ancient Greek γέλασις (gélasis, “laughing”). It may refer to:

- Gelasius of Nilopolis, Egyptian Christian abbot
- Gelasius of Caesarea (died 395), bishop of Caesarea
- Pope Gelasius I (died 496)
- Gelasius of Cyzicus, misidentified as 5th century ecclesiastical writer Anonymus Cyzicenus
- Pope Gelasius II (died 1119)
- Gelasius, Archbishop of Armagh (died 1174)
- Gelasius Ó Cuileanáin (died 1580), Cistercian Abbot of Boyle, Ireland
- Nikollë Gazulli (1895–1946), who wrote under the pseudonym Gelasius
