= Henry Folliott, 1st Baron Folliott =

English soldier in Ireland (1568–1622)

Henry Folliot
- Baron Folliot
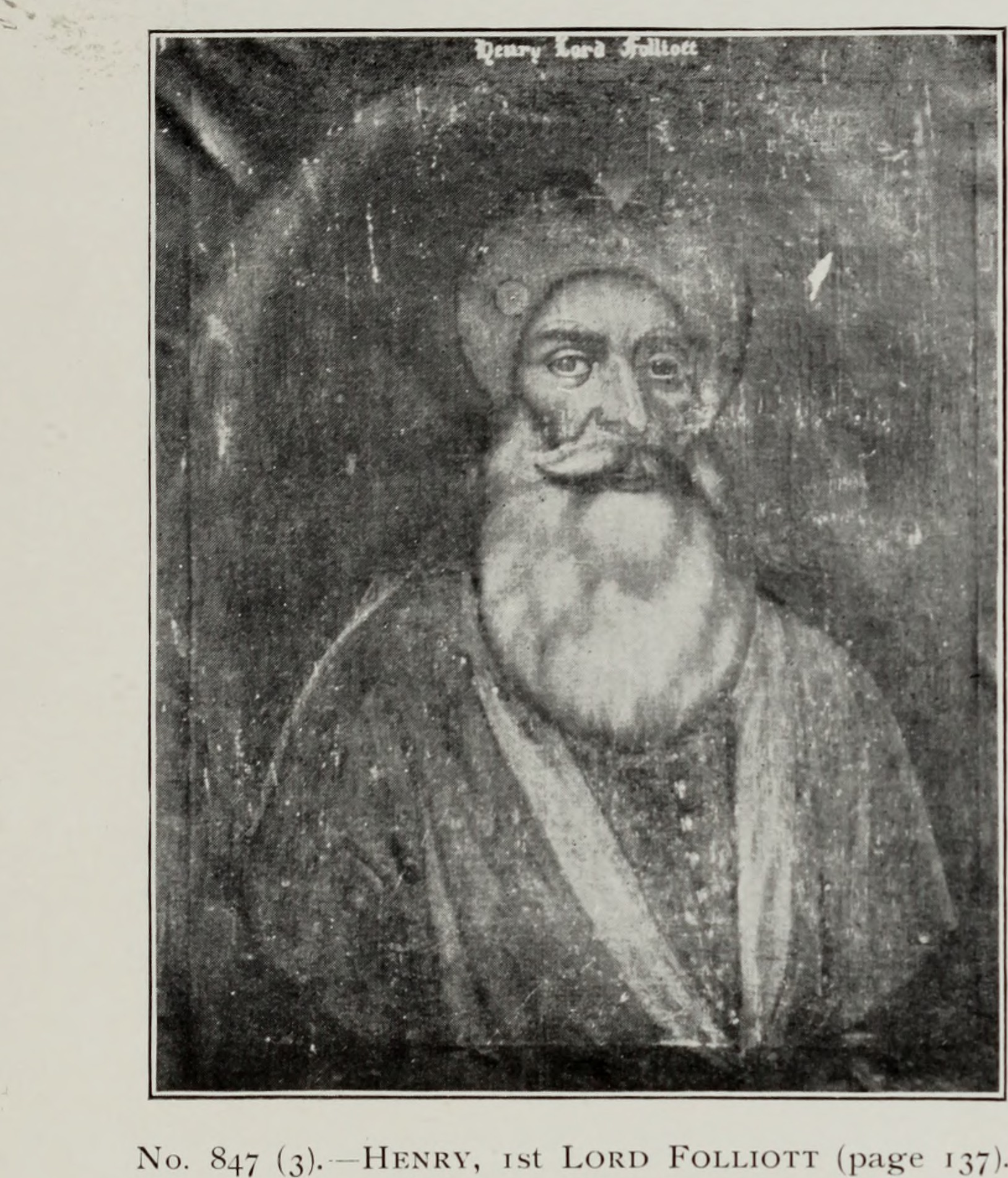
- Tenure: 1620–1622
- Successor: Thomas Folliott, 2nd Baron Folliott
- Born: 1568
- Died: 10 November 1622 (aged 53–54)
- Spouse: Anne Strode
- Issue Detail: Thomas & others
- Father: Thomas Folliot of Pirton Court
- Mother: Katherine Lygon

Henry Folliott, 1st Baron Folliott (1568–1622) was an English soldier in the Irish army. He fought in the Nine Years' War and then in the suppression of O'Doherty's rebellion at the Siege of Tory Island.

== Birth and origins ==
Henry was born in 1568, the second son of Thomas Folliott and his wife Katherine Lygon. His father was esquire of Pirton Court, Pirton, Worcestershire. His father's family was a cadet branch of the baronial family of Foliot that had been established in England at the Norman Conquest in 1066.

Henry's mother was his father's second wife. She was a daughter of William Lygon of Madresfield Court in Malvern, Worcestershire.

== Marriage and children ==
Folliott married Anne Strode, daughter of Sir William Strode of Stoke-sub-Hamdon, Somerset. (Note: His wife, Anne Strode, was not one of the seven daughters of William Strode (1562–1637) of Newnham (Old), as their names as well as those of their husbands are known: none is called Anne, and none married a Folliott.)

Henry and Anne had five sons:

1. Thomas (1613–1697), his successor
2. Michael Folliott (d. 17 November 1638)
3. Arthur, died young
4. Henry, died childless
5. Charles (died after 1621)

—and two daughters:

1. Frances (died 1638), married Sir Robert King MP of Boyle Abbey, and had issue including John King, 1st Baron Kingston and Sir Robert King, 1st Baronet
2. Elizabeth, married firstly on 7 May 1640 Richard Wingfield and had issue Folliott Wingfield, 1st Viscount Powerscourt; she married secondly on 12 April 1646 Edward Trevor; she married thirdly Sir John Ponsonby (d. 1678) and had issue including William Ponsonby, 1st Viscount Duncannon.

== Nine Years' War ==
He came to Ireland and served the Crown during the Nine Years' War (Ireland) (1594–1603). in 1599 he was knighted by Robert Devereux, 2nd Earl of Essex. He commanded a regiment under Lord Mountjoy in 1601 at the Battle of Kinsale. In 1603 he was commissioned to develop a township adjacent to Ballyshannon Castle in the south of County Donegal, Ulster. In 1608 he commanded troops in the suppression of O'Doherty's rebellion and successfully captured or killed some of the rebels during the Siege of Tory Island. The parliamentary borough of Ballyshannon (Parliament of Ireland constituency) was incorporated in 1613 just before the Irish Parliament of 1613–1615.

== Later life and death ==
He was created Baron Folliott, of Ballyshannon in the County of Donegal, in the Peerage of Ireland on 22 January 1620. Lord Folliott, as he was now, acquired salmon fisheries and over 3,000 acres (12 km^{2}) of land in County Donegal from Francis Gofton. His residence was Wardtown Castle, Ballymacaward, Ballyshannon, County Donegal.

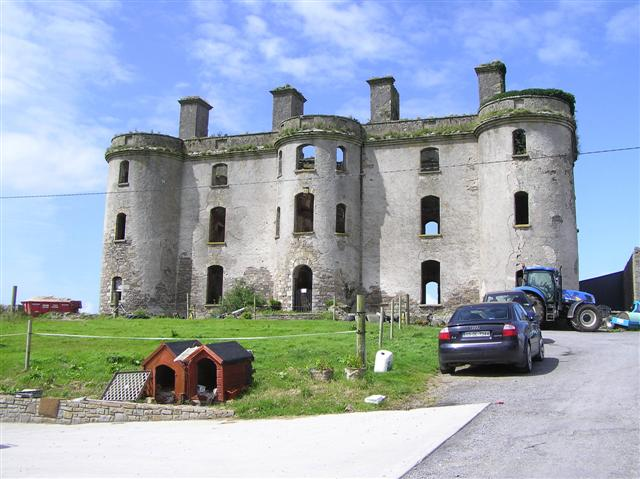
Ruins of Wardtown Castle, Ballyshannon, County Donegal

Folliott died on 10 November 1622 and was succeeded by his eldest son Thomas as the 2nd Baron Folliott. His widow married Robert Dillon, who was then styled "Baron Dillon of Kilkenny-West" as the heir of the 1st Earl of Roscommon. She was his third wife and had further issue by him, including Carey Dillon, 5th Earl of Roscommon. She died c. 1650.

== Notes and references ==
=== Sources ===
- Begley, Anthony (1991). "The Folliotts, Wardtown Castle and the Colleen Bawn". Donegal Annual: 61–69. Archived from the original on 10 August 2009.
- Burke, Bernard (1883). A Genealogical History of the Dormant, Abeyant, Forfeited and Extinct Peerages of the British Empire (New ed.). London: Harrison. OCLC 499232768.
- Cokayne, George Edward (1926). Gibbs, Vicary (ed.). The complete peerage of England, Scotland, Ireland, Great Britain and the United Kingdom, extant, extinct, or dormant. Vol. V (2nd ed.). London: St Catherine Press. OCLC 228661424. – Eardley of Spalding to Goojerat
- Shaw, William A. (1906). The Knights of England. Vol. II. London: Sherratt & Hughes. – Knights bachelors & Index

Peerage of Ireland
New creation	Baron Folliott; 1620–1622	Succeeded by Thomas Folliott
