= Maurice Mahon, 1st Baron Hartland =

Irish politician and landowner

Maurice Mahon, 1st Baron Hartland (21 June 1738 – 4 January 1819), was an Irish politician and landowner. He and his sons intermittently represented County Roscommon in the Parliament of Ireland and the United Kingdom Parliament. He was able to transform his support of the Union of Great Britain and Ireland into a peerage, but was frustrated in his subsequent desire to become a viscount.

Mahon was the son of Thomas Mahon and Hon. Jane, daughter of Maurice Crosbie, 1st Baron Brandon, and Lady Elizabeth Fitzmaurice. He was born in Strokestown. On 17 June 1765, he married Hon. Catherine (died March 1834), daughter of Stephen Moore, 1st Viscount Mount Cashell and Alicia Colville. They had three sons: Thomas (1766–1835), Stephen (1768–1828), and Maurice (1772–1845).

Maurice's father Thomas died in 1782, and Maurice succeeded to the family's Strokestown estate. The Mahons were one of several important electoral interests in Roscommon, and Maurice was able to succeed his father as one of the representatives for County Roscommon in the Irish Parliament. However, he lost the seat to Arthur French, of French Park, in 1783.

Mahon was eager to be created a peer, and the widespread bribery preceding the Union provided him with an opportunity. When Viscount Kingsborough succeeded his father as Earl of Kingston in 1799 and triggered a by-election for County Roscommon, Mahon saw an opportunity. The King family's preferred candidate, Hon. Robert King, opposed the Union, and Mahon got the support of the administration by promising them a pro-Union vote. With their help, Mahon won the support of the Catholic and independent interests of the county for his eldest son Thomas, who had recently defended Carlow during the Rebellion of 1798. King ultimately stood down before the poll, and Thomas took the Roscommon seat. However, the Roscommon electors were implacably anti-Union, and Thomas absented himself from Parliament rather than vote for or against the Union. Maurice was forced to buy a seat at Knocktopher for his younger son Stephen to carry out his obligations to the administration.

The stratagem worked: Stephen voted for the Union, and on 30 July 1800, Maurice was raised to the Peerage of Ireland as Baron Hartland, of Strokestown in the County of Roscommon, as a reward for his support. The administration still wished to conciliate the powerful King family, and without their support, Thomas did not stand for Roscommon in the 1802 election. In the 1806 election, Hartland put forth his younger son Stephen for Roscommon, at a cost of £1,696 18s. in election expenses; he made a strong showing and the Kings conceded without a poll, to the administration's displeasure. Stephen continued to support government on Hartland's instructions, his object being to secure a further promotion to a viscount in the Irish peerage. He was not successful in this, although Stephen did not go into opposition until shortly after his father's death. Hartland died on 4 January 1819, aged 80, and was succeeded in the barony by his son, Thomas.

Parliament of Ireland
Preceded by Thomas Mahon; Edward Crofton	Member of Parliament for County Roscommon; 1782–1783; With: Edward Crofton	Succeeded by Edward Crofton; Arthur French
Peerage of Ireland
New creation	Baron Hartland; 1800–1819	Succeeded by Thomas Mahon
