= Gerard Lowther =

Gerard Lowther may refer to:

- Sir Gerard Lowther (judge) (1589–1660), Chief Justice of the Irish Common Pleas
- Sir Gerard Lowther, 1st Baronet (1858–1916), British diplomat
