= Lord Lieutenant of Roscommon =

Representative of the British monarch in County Roscommon

This is a list of people who served as Lord Lieutenant of County Roscommon.

There were lieutenants of counties in Ireland until the reign of James II, when they were renamed governors. The office of Lord Lieutenant was recreated on 23 August 1831. Roscommon was lost to the United Kingdom in 1922 upon the formation of the Irish Free State.

== Governors ==
- Edward King, 1st Earl of Kingston: 1772–1797
- Maurice Mahon, 1st Baron Hartland (died 1819)
- Sir Edward Crofton, 2nd Baronet: 1782–1797
- Charles Dillon, 12th Viscount Dillon: 1797–1813
- Thomas Mahon, 2nd Baron Hartland: –1831
- Robert King, 1st Viscount Lorton: –1831
- Arthur French: 1821–1831

== Lord Lieutenants ==
- Robert King, 1st Viscount Lorton: 7 October 1831 – 20 November 1854
- Arthur French, 1st Baron de Freyne: 18 December 1854 – 29 September 1856
- Edward King Tenison: 4 December 1856 – 19 June 1878
- Edward Robert King-Harman: 5 October 1878 – 10 June 1888
- Henry King-Tenison, 8th Earl of Kingston: 25 July 1888 – 13 January 1896
- Charles Owen O'Conor, The O'Conor Don: 5 March 1896 – 30 June 1906
- Denis Charles Joseph O'Conor: 5 September 1906 – 23 February 1917
- William Talbot: 25 August 1917 – 1922
