= Viscount Lorton =

Title in the peerage of Ireland

Viscount Lorton, of Boyle in the County of Roscommon, is a title in the Peerage of Ireland. It was created on 28 May 1806 for General Robert King, 1st Baron Erris. He had already been made Baron Erris, of Boyle in the County of Roscommon, on 29 December 1800, also in the Peerage of Ireland. King was the second son of Robert King, 2nd Earl of Kingston (see Earl of Kingston for earlier history of the family). In 1823 he was elected an Irish representative peer. His son, the second Viscount, succeeded to the earldom of Kingston on the death of his cousin in 1869. The titles remain united.

The Honourable Laurence King-Harman, younger son of the first Viscount, was the father of Edward King-Harman, a politician, and Sir Charles King-Harman, High Commissioner to Cyprus.

== Viscounts Lorton (1806) ==
- Robert Edward King, 1st Viscount Lorton (1773–1854)
- Robert King, 2nd Viscount Lorton (1804–1869) (succeeded as 6th Earl of Kingston in 1869)

For further succession, see Earl of Kingston.

== See also ==
- Baron Kingston
- Stafford-King-Harman baronets
