= Thomas Mahon, 2nd Baron Hartland =

British politician

Lieutenant-General The Right Honourable The Lord Hartland

Member of Parliament for County Roscommon
- In office 1801–1802

Member of Parliament for County Roscommon
- In office 1799–1800

Personal details
- Born: 12 August 1766 Dublin
- Died: 8 December 1835 (aged 69) London
- Spouse: Catherine Topping
- Relatives: Maurice Mahon, 1st Baron Hartland (father)
- Education: The Royal School, Armagh; Trinity College Dublin; St John's College, Cambridge

Military service
- Allegiance: United Kingdom
- Branch/service: British Army
- Years of service: 1784–1835
- Rank: Lieutenant-General
- Commands: 9th Light Dragoons
- Battles/wars: French Revolutionary Wars; Irish Rebellion of 1798; Battle of Carlow; Napoleonic Wars; Invasion of the River Plate; Walcheren Campaign

Lieutenant-General Thomas Mahon, 2nd Baron Hartland (12 August 1766 – 8 December 1835), styled Hon. Thomas Mahon from 1800 to 1819, was an Irish soldier, politician and peer. Son of a landed proprietor with an estate at Strokestown, he joined the British Army, serving for most of his career with the 9th Light Dragoons. His garrison skillfully ambushed and destroyed a force of United Irishmen at the Battle of Carlow in 1798. He briefly represented County Roscommon in the Irish and UK Parliaments as part of his father's successful scheme to obtain a peerage by supporting the Union, but this was not popular with the county electors, and he abandoned Parliament in 1802 to return to the military. He had the misfortune to be present at two military debacles of the Napoleonic Wars, the second invasion of the Río de la Plata and the Walcheren Campaign, and while he was not personally implicated in either, he saw no further notable military service. Mahon succeeded his father as Lord Hartland in 1819 and died without issue in 1835, his title and estates passing to his youngest brother.

== Early life and military service ==
Mahon was born in Dublin in 1766, the eldest son of Maurice Mahon and his wife Hon. Catherine Moore, and grandson of Thomas Mahon, then the representative for County Roscommon in the Parliament of Ireland. Thomas was educated at Portarlington School and The Royal School, Armagh. He was admitted to Trinity College Dublin on 10 July 1782 and obtained his BA in 1786. While at Trinity, he was commissioned an ensign in the 47th Regiment of Foot on 17 April 1784. Admitted as a fellow-commoner to St John's College, Cambridge on 31 October 1786, he received his MA, by incorporation, in 1787.

After college, Mahon continued his military career. On 18 December 1790, he purchased a lieutenancy in the 47th Regiment. He obtained a captaincy in the newly raised 33rd Light Dragoons in 1794, and transferred into the 32nd Light Dragoons as a major on 26 November 1794. Major Mahon transferred into the 24th Light Dragoons on 30 April 1796, after the 32nd was disbanded. On 1 January 1797, he became a lieutenant-colonel in the 9th Light Dragoons. Mahon was in command of the garrison of Carlow when the United Irishmen rebelled in 1798. When he obtained intelligence of a planned attack by the rebels on the night of 24 May 1798, Mahon set a deadly ambush. Some of the townsmen left the town to join the rebels; after they left, the garrison was dispersed among strong points throughout the town. The rebels were allowed to penetrate without resistance to the Potato Market, only to be met by a withering fire. Many took refuge in houses along Tullow Street, by which they had entered. These were promptly set on fire by the garrison, and the rebels who fled the flames were shot or bayoneted in the streets. The Battle of Carlow had come to an end by the next morning, when from four to six hundred of the rebels lay dead, with no loss to the garrison. Swift reprisals followed: martial law was imposed, and two hundred executions took place shortly after, including that of Sir Edward Crosbie.

== MP for Roscommon ==
In 1799 Viscount Kingsborough succeeded his father as Earl of Kingston and vacated his seat for County Roscommon. The Kingston interest, which opposed the Union, put forth the new earl's brother, Col. Hon. Robert King to succeed him. Mahon, a pro-Unionist, gained the backing of the Lord-Lieutenant, and the Dublin Castle administration enlisted the independent and Catholic interests in the county on his behalf. King ultimately retired from the contest without going to a poll, and Mahon took the seat at Roscommon. His father hoped to obtain a peerage from the administration in exchange for arranging Thomas's vote for the Union in Parliament. But Thomas found his constituents implacably hostile to the Union, and dared not vote in favour, absenting himself from Parliament instead. Maurice was forced to buy a seat at Knocktopher for Thomas's younger brother Stephen to carry out his obligations to the administration.

Maurice was rewarded with the title of Baron Hartland after the Union, and Thomas, like other Irish county members, continued to sit for Roscommon in the Parliament of the United Kingdom. His tenure would not last long; the King interest was far from defeated, and when Lord Hartland proposed a candidate for High Sheriff of Roscommon in 1801, he was informed by Charles Abbott, the Chief Secretary for Ireland, that Col. King, now Lord Erris, had put forth his own candidate and that the government would not disoblige him. Erris was wealthy and capable of fighting an expensive electoral contest; Hartland attempted to persuade Henry Augustus Dillon to stand alongside Thomas for Roscommon to bolster his popularity. Hartland failed to do so, so Thomas declined to stand for the county at the 1802 election. Absent on military service for the 1806 election, he did not return to politics, leaving his brother Stephen to represent the family interest in that seat.

== Napoleonic Wars and after ==
He received a promotion to colonel on 2 November 1805. The 9th Light Dragoons were among the regiments sent to South America after the capture of Montevideo. They were not provided with mounts, and fought as infantry. Mahon was given command of a brigade consisting of the 9th, four dismounted troops of the Carabiniers, and the 40th and 45th regiments of foot. Mahon, with part of his brigade, was ordered to guard the heavy artillery at Reduction, and did not personally take part in the bungled attack on Buenos Aires.

He was afterwards appointed a colonel on the staff of the Walcheren Expedition, again commanding the 9th. The regiment represented the only cavalry of the army's left wing, and was so badly affected by sickness acquired there as to cripple it for the remainder of the Napoleonic Wars. He was promoted to major-general on 4 June 1811.

On 14 October 1811, Mahon married Catherine, the daughter of James Topping; they had no children. He succeeded his father as Lord Hartland on 4 January 1819 and inherited the main family estates at Strokestown. Mahon and his brother Stephen were both promoted to lieutenant-general on 12 August 1819, in part to conciliate them over their lack of other military preferments, and their father's unrequited desire to be made a viscount. This was unsuccessful; Stephen, still sitting for Roscommon, went over to the opposition. Thomas died in London, aged 69, on 8 December 1835 and was succeeded by his youngest brother, Rev. Maurice.

Parliament of Ireland
Preceded by Arthur French; Viscount Kingsborough	Member of Parliament for County Roscommon; 1799–1800; With: Arthur French	Irish Parliament abolished
Parliament of the United Kingdom
New constituency	Member of Parliament for County Roscommon; 1801–1802; With: Arthur French	Succeeded by Arthur French; Edward King
Peerage of Ireland
Preceded by Maurice Mahon	Baron Hartland; 1819–1835	Succeeded by Maurice Mahon
