= Henry King (died 1821) =

Anglo-Irish politician

Henry King PC (I) (18 February 1733 – 23 February 1821) was an Anglo-Irish politician.

King sat in the Irish House of Commons as the Member of Parliament for Boyle between 1761 and the constituency's disenfranchisement in 1800. In 1770 he was made a member of the Privy Council of Ireland.

He was the son of Sir Henry King 3rd Baronet of Boyle Abbey and Isabella Wingfield. He died without issue.

Parliament of Ireland
Preceded by Arthur French; Edward King	Member of Parliament for Boyle; 1761–1800; With: Benjamin Burton (1761–63); Richard Fitzgerald (1763–76); Viscount Kingsborough (1776–83); Peter Metge (1783); Robert Boyd (1783–90); Laurence Harman Harman (1790–92); Thomas Tenison (1792–97); Viscount Kingsborough (1797–98); Hon. Robert Edward King (1798–1800)	Succeeded by Constituency disenfranchised
