= Battle of Carlow =

Battle of the Irish Rebellion of 1798

Coordinates: 52.836°N 6.928°W

- Part of the Irish Rebellion
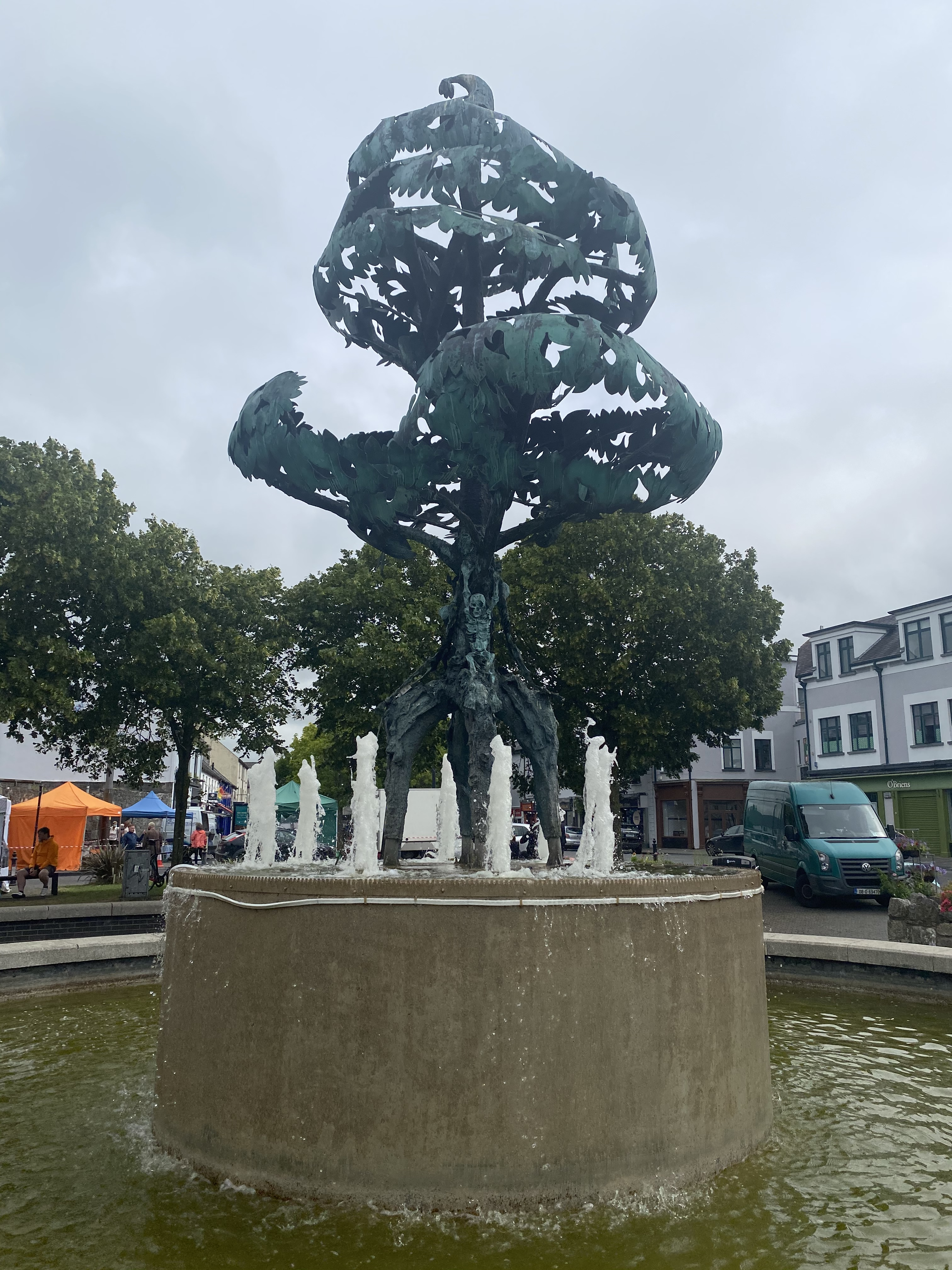
- Liberty Tree in Carlow, a memorial to the Battle
Date	25 May 1798
Location	Carlow, County Carlow
Result	British victory

Belligerents
(Kingdom of Great Britain) Great Britain: (Kingdom of Ireland) British Ireland	United Irishmen

Commanders and leaders
Thomas Mahon	Heydon, Brennan, Redmond, Nolan

Strength
c. 500	c. 1,200

Casualties and losses
None reported	c. 600 and 400 civilians

The Battle of Carlow took place in Carlow town, Ireland on 25 May 1798 when Carlow rebels rose in support of the 1798 rebellion which had begun the day before in County Kildare. The United Irishmen organisation in Carlow led by a young brogue-maker named Mick Heydon who had taken over the leadership following the arrest of the previous leader, Peter Ivers, who was arrested with several other leading United Irishmen at Oliver Bond's house in March of that year, had assembled on the night of the 24th and set off at dawn to attack the county town. Picking up more volunteers along the way, their numbers swelled to around 1,200 they marched completely unopposed.

An attack on the town would take place simultaneously from four different directions, through the four main streets.

1. From Bennekerry and Tinryland, an assault would be made into Tullow Street.

2. From Ballybar and Garryhundon, people would march in through Burrin Street.

3. From Laois, the attack would be across Graiguecullen bridge, over the Barrow and past the old Norman Castle crouching in the darkness.

4. From Palatine and Maganey, Dublin Street would be infiltrated.

All would converge on Potato Market.

As the various contingents advanced, they did not know that Colonel Mahon of the Ninth Dragoons had the military in the barracks and the town on the highest alert. Their every move was known to him. A strong party of military was stationed in the court house which is now known as the Deighton Hall (this is situated immediately to the north of the bridge across the river Burrin). Another party with two small cannon were stationed on the bridge. On Graigue bridge, there was an officer's guard of yeomen. In Dublin Street and to the north, well-armed loyalists filled some large strong houses, but without military support, as the attack was known to be weak from that quarter. Tullow Street was left open and to all appearances undefended against what was expected would be the strongest attack of all. The trap was laid.

When the Rebels entered the town of Carlow they were joined not only by the Catholic inhabitants but also by people who had secretly arrived there during the previous day and night. A crowd of approximately two hundred people broke away and marched through Tullow Street but when they reached Potato Market their fortunes changed.

However, the forewarned garrison had prepared a deadly ambush, posting men at every window and rooftop. As the rebels relaxed after their apparently easy victory, the concealed soldiers poured volley after volley of gunfire into the masses of exposed rebels. Taken completely by surprise, the shocked and poorly armed rebels broke and fled only to run into another army ambush. The survivors tried to escape by breaking through adjoining houses and cabins which were set alight by the pursuing soldiers causing the deaths of 200 of the inhabitants. One survivor William Farrell wrote of the carnage;

I know a man as gentle as any who woke to realize his house was on fire [and] threw on some clothes and ran to the street carrying his young daughter. He was instantly shot dead and his child.

When they came to Potato Market, the place appointed, they halted and commenced shouting as a signal for all their friends to come to their assistance, but they shouted in vain; the friends they expected were too much terrified with the preparations that were made to stir one inch. When they found this, that they were left alone, they were seized with a sudden panic, and some of them proposed to march forward to bring in the Queen's County men. But just as they made the movement to go on, there were two sentries at the Collector's house, a little below them in Tullow Street, and one of them presented his piece and fired, and killed one of the party, and this single shot stopped the whole body.

In the meantime the County Laois Rebels on their way to aid the Carlow rebels having heard mixed reports of the battle and hearing the fate of their comrades decided it was too late to help and changed their plans. They were led by men called Redmond and Brennan. They proceeded to Ballickmoyler instead, some miles outside Carlow but in the county Laois and there they set fire to many loyalist houses and attacked the home of John Whitty, a Protestant clergyman. Twenty-one of the Rebels were killed in the fray but despite this they eventually overcame the loyalists inhabitants.

An estimated 500 rebels and civilians were killed in the streets of the town with no reported losses to the military. Another 150 were executed in the repression over the following ten days. A local man who became known as "Paddy the Pointer" is reported to have helped to identify escaped rebels to the military by riding around the town and pointing them out. A memorial, where remains of many of those who perished that day were flung into a "Croppy Hole" (mass grave), is located in Graiguecullen.
