= Sir Henry King, 3rd Baronet =

Irish politician and baronet

Sir Henry King PC (Ire)
- 3rd Baronet King of Boyle Abbey
- Tenure: 1720–1740
- Predecessor: Sir John King, 2nd Baronet
- Successor: Sir Robert King, 4th Baronet
- Born: c. 1681
- Died: 1 January 1740 (aged 58–59)
- Spouse: Isabella Wingfield (m. 1722)
- Issue: 7, including: Robert King, 1st Baron Kingsborough; Edward King, 1st Earl of Kingston; Isabella King
- Father: Sir Robert King, 1st Baronet
- Mother: Frances Gore

Sir Henry King, 3rd Baronet PC (I) (c. 1681 – 1 January 1740) was an Anglo-Irish politician.

== Biography ==
King was the second son of Sir Robert King, 1st Baronet, and Frances Gore. He sat in the Irish House of Commons as the Member of Parliament for Boyle between 1707 and 1727. In 1720 he succeeded his elder brother, John, to the family baronetcy. He represented County Roscommon from 1727 to 1740. In 1733 he was made a member of the Privy Council of Ireland.

He married Isabella Wingfield, daughter of Edward Wingfield and Eleanor Gore, and sister of Richard, 1st Viscount Powerscourt in April 1722, and had seven children. Their eldest son, Robert King, was made Baron Kingsborough in 1748, while their second son, Edward King, was made Earl of Kingston in 1768. Their daughter Isabella married Thomas St Lawrence, 1st Earl of Howth.

Parliament of Ireland
Preceded by Sir Robert King, Bt; Sir John King, Bt	Member of Parliament for Boyle; 1707–1727; With: Sir John King, Bt (1707–15); Robert Sandford (1715–1727)	Succeeded by Arthur French; Richard Wingfield
Preceded by Sir Edward Crofton, Bt; Arthur French	Member of Parliament for County Roscommon; 1727–1740; With: Sir Edward Crofton, Bt (1727–30); Nicholas Mahon (1730–35); Sir Edward Crofton, Bt (1735–40)	Succeeded by Sir Edward Crofton, Bt; Henry Sandford
Baronetage of Ireland
Preceded by John King	Baronet (of Boyle Abbey); 1720–1740	Succeeded by Robert King
