= Baron Kingston =

Extinct barony in the Peerage of the United Kingdom

Baron Kingston is a title that has been created twice in the Peerage of Ireland and once in the Peerage of the United Kingdom. The first creation came in 1660 when the military commander Sir John King was made Baron Kingston, of Kingston in the County of Dublin. He was the elder brother of Sir Robert King, 1st Baronet, of Boyle Abbey (from whom the Earls of Kingston descend). Two of his sons, the second and third Barons, both succeeded in the title. The title became extinct in 1761 on the death of the latter's son, the fourth Baron, who had no surviving male issue. However, the title was revived three years later when his kinsman Sir Edward King, 5th Baronet, of Boyle Abbey, was made Baron Kingston, of Rockingham in the County of Roscommon. He was also created Viscount Kingston in 1766 and Earl of Kingston in 1768.

In 1821, George King, 3rd Earl of Kingston, was made Baron Kingston, of Mitchelstown, in the county of Cork, in the Peerage of the United Kingdom, enabling him to sit in the House of Lords. See the earldom title for more information on this creation.

== First creation (1660) ==
- John King, 1st Baron Kingston (died 1676)
- Robert King, 2nd Baron Kingston (died 1693)
- John King, 3rd Baron Kingston (c. 1664–1728)
- James King, 4th Baron Kingston (1693–1761)
  - Hon. William King (died 1755)

== Second creation (1764) ==
- see Earl of Kingston

== Third creation (1821) ==
- see Earl of Kingston

== See also ==
- Viscount Lorton
