= Richard Lowther (1532–1608) =

English soldier and official

Sir Richard Lowther (14 February 1532 – 27 January 1607) of Lowther Hall, Westmorland was an English soldier and official. He was twice High Sheriff of Cumberland and Lord Warden of the West March in 1592.

== Life ==
He was grandson of John Lowther, captain of Carlisle Castle in 1545, and who was twice sheriff of Cumberland during the reign of Henry VIII. John Lowther married Lucy, daughter of Sir Christopher Curwen of Workington. He was the eldest son of Hugh Lowther (died 1546?), by his wife Dorothy, daughter of Henry Clifford, 10th Baron Clifford. He succeeded to the family estates at Lowther and elsewhere in Westmorland on his grandfather's death in 1552.

Richard Lowther was created deputy-warden of the west marches early in Elizabeth's reign, and was knighted and appointed high sheriff of Cumberland in 1565.

== Captivity of Mary Queen of Scots ==
In the course of her flight to the Solway, after her defeat at the battle of Langside in May 1568, Mary Queen of Scots sent a letter to Lowther asking whether he could ensure her safety. He returned an evasive answer, but added that if in the meanwhile the Queen of Scots were forced to enter England he would protect her. On the evening of 16 May Mary landed in an open fishing-boat at Workington. The news spread rapidly, and on the next evening Lowther, with an escort of neighbouring gentry, conveyed her to Carlisle Castle. There she held for several days in succession a little court, and received, among others, the Earl of Northumberland, who claimed the custody of her person in right of his office as lord warden, and by authority of the council of York.

Lowther refused to give up Mary, and a violent altercation ensued. Northumberland offered "great threatenings". Lowther, however, had a band of soldiers to back him, and Mary remained in his hands. A few days later he permitted the Duke of Norfolk to hold an interview with her. Lowther was heavily fined in the Star Chamber for allowing Norfolk and Mary to meet, and before the end of May he was relieved of his charge of the fugitive by Sir Francis Knollys and Lord Scrope. When, however, the Queen of Scots left Carlisle on 13 July for Bolton Castle, Lowther Hall was chosen by Knollys as her first sleeping-place.

== Rising of the North ==
In 1569 Lowther took part in the attempt to place Mary at the head of the rising of the North, and orders were issued for the apprehension of his younger brother Gerard. The latter escaped, and in 1570 advocated a scheme for the forcible deliverance of Mary from Tutbury Castle, in which he counted upon Sir Richard's assistance. But the project was not approved by the Duke of Norfolk, under whose guidance the brothers appear to have been working on Mary's behalf.

== Aftermath ==
On Norfolk's execution in June 1572, Gerard Lowther succeeded in extricating himself. This was perhaps through the influence of his wife, Lucy Dudley, widow of Albany Fetherstonhaugh, and second cousin once removed to Robert Dudley, 1st Earl of Leicester. This Gerard, who was a bencher of Lincoln's Inn, was sheriff of Cumberland in 1592.

== Later life ==
Richard Lowther was sheriff of Cumberland for the second time in 1587, and succeeded Scrope as lord warden in 1591. He died on 27 January 1607 at Lowther, and was buried in the parish church, where there was a monument to him with a full-length effigy.

== Family ==
Lowther married Frances, daughter of John Middleton of Middleton, Westmorland, and had a large family. At the Union of the Crowns, his eldest surviving son, Christopher (d. 1617), attended James VI and I at Newcastle, and was knighted on 13 April 1603. By his second wife, Eleanor, daughter of William Musgrave of Hayton Castle, Sir Christopher had issue Sir John Lowther, M.P. for Westmorland in four parliaments (1623–30), who was knighted by Charles I in 1627, and appointed to the council of the north in 1629. This Sir John was great-grandfather of Sir John Lowther, 1st Viscount Lonsdale, and was also ancestor of the Lowthers of Swillington and of the Lowthers of Whitehaven.

Sir Richard's fourth son, Sir Gerard Lowther (died 1624), was a judge of the common pleas in Ireland (12 October 1610), and was knighted 3 May 1618. His godson, also Sir Gerard Lowther (1589–1660), apparently an illegitimate son of his brother Christopher, matriculated at The Queen's College, Oxford, in 1605, was called to the bar from Gray's Inn in 1614, and was admitted to King's Inns, Dublin, in 1619. He was appointed a baron of the exchequer in Ireland by Charles I in 1628.
