= Richard Fitzgerald (died 1776) =

Irish Member of Parliament

Colonel Richard Fitzgerald (by 1733 – 1776) was an Irish Member of Parliament.

He was the fifth son of Gerald Fitzgerald of Coolanawle, Queen's County, by his wife Mary, daughter of Sir Robert Hartpole, of Shrule Castle in Queen's County. He lived at Kilminchy Castle, Portlaoise, and Mount Offaly, County Kildare.

He was elected to the Irish House of Commons for Boyle on 21 October 1763 and sat until his death.

He married firstly, Margaret, daughter of James King, 4th Baron Kingston, of Mitchelstown Castle and his first wife Elizabeth Meade, daughter of Sir John Meade, 1st Baronet. They had one daughter Caroline, who married Robert King, Lord Kingsborough. He married, secondly, Mary, daughter and heiress of Fairfax Mercer, of Fair Hill, County Louth. Their son Gerald was the father of the New Zealand politician James FitzGerald and Gerard George Fitzgerald.

In 1776 Fitzgerald was shot in a duel with his daughter's father-in-law, Edward King, 1st Earl of Kingston. His son-in-law Lord Kingsborough succeeded him as M.P. for Boyle.

Parliament of Ireland
Preceded by Benjamin Burton; Henry King	Member of Parliament for Boyle; 1763–1776; With: Henry King	Succeeded by Viscount Kingsborough; Henry King
