= Maurice Mahon, 3rd Baron Hartland =

Irish peer and clergyman

Maurice Mahon, 3rd Baron Hartland (6 October 1772 – 11 November 1845) was a Church of Ireland clergyman and Irish peer.

Maurice was born on 6 October 1772, the third son of Maurice Mahon and grandson of Thomas Mahon, then an MP for County Roscommon in the Parliament of Ireland. He was admitted a pensioner at St John's College, Cambridge on 15 June 1790. He received his BA in 1794 and his MA in 1797. He entered holy orders, and was appointed prebendary of Kilmeen in Tuam Cathedral in 1804. On 24 November 1813, he married Isabella Jane, the daughter of William Hume, but they had no children. In 1814, he was appointed minor canon and vicar choral of St Patrick's Cathedral, Dublin.

Maurice succeeded his eldest brother Thomas as Baron Hartland in 1835, but was declared a lunatic the following year. He died at the family estate of Strokestown on 11 November 1845. The peerage became extinct, while the estate passed to his first cousin, Major Denis Mahon, who was assassinated by his tenants in 1847.

Peerage of Ireland
Preceded by Thomas Mahon	Baron Hartland; 1835–1845	Extinct
