= Robert King (church historian) =

Irish clergyman

Robert King (1815–4 Jan 1900) was an Irish clergyman and school teacher who published extensively on church history.

== Life and career ==
King was born in Cork, the eldest son of Sarah King (her married and maiden name) and Joseph King (grocer and naval supplier). He attended Trinity College Dublin where he was elected a Scholar in 1835. He was a Senior Moderator (with Gold Medal) BA in mathematics 1838, also winning prizes in Hebrew and Divinity. He held various positions for the first 20 years of his career, including serving as a curate in counties Dublin, Londonderry and Armagh. From 1858 until his death he was headmaster of the diocesan school in Ballymena, County Antrim.

His numerous publications include A Primer of the History of the Holy Catholic Church in Ireland (3 volumes, 1849-1855) and a memoir on the early history of the primacy of Armagh (1854). He was also an Irish language scholar, and authored several books in Irish, including a grammar and a reedited version of the Book of Common Prayer in Irish (1860).

In 1857 he married Harriette Stuart (daughter of Alexander Stuart, rector of Killincoole, Armagh). The couple had nine sons, of whom Richard King became dean of Derry.
