= Boyle (Parliament of Ireland constituency) =

Pre-1801 Irish constituency

- Former borough constituency for the Irish House of Commons
- County: County Roscommon
- Borough: Boyle

1614–1801
- Replaced by: Disfranchised

Boyle was a constituency represented in the Irish House of Commons from 1611 to 1800.

== History ==
In the Patriot Parliament of 1689 summoned by James II, Boyle was represented with two members.

== Members of Parliament, 1614–1801 ==
- 1613 John Cusack and Robert Meredith
- 1634–1635 Robert King and Robert Meredyth
- 1639–1649 Robert King (sat for Roscommon. Replaced by Michael Burnell) and Richard Wingfield
- 1661–1666 Ellis Goodwin and Owen Lloyd (both died 1665 and were replaced by John Burniston and John Stepney)

=== 1689–1801 ===
Election	First MP	Second MP
1689	John King	Terence MacDermott
1692	William Handcock	Stephen Ludlow
1695	Sir Edward Crofton, 2nd Bt	John King (Note: Succeeded as 2nd Baronet in 1707)
1703	Sir Robert King, 1st Bt	John King
1707	Henry King (Note: Succeeded as 3rd Baronet in 1720)	John King
1715	Henry King	Robert Sandford
1727	Arthur French	Richard Wingfield
1743	Arthur French	Sir Robert King, 4th Bt
1749	Arthur French	Edward King (Note: Succeeded as 5th Baronet in 1755)
1761	Henry King	Benjamin Burton
1763	Henry King	Richard FitzGerald
1776	Henry King	Viscount Kingsborough
October 1783	Henry King	Peter Metge (Note: Also elected for Ratoath in 1783, for which he chose to sit)
1783	Henry King	Robert Boyd
1790	Henry King	Laurence Harman Harman (Note: Also elected for County Longford in 1790, for which he chose to sit)
1792	Henry King	Thomas Tenison
1797	Henry King	Viscount Kingsborough (Note: Elected, but never took his seat)
January 1798	Henry King	Hon. Robert Edward King
1801	Disenfranchised	

== Bibliography ==
- O'Hart, John (2007). The Irish and Anglo-Irish Landed Gentry: When Cromwell came to Ireland. Vol. II. Heritage Books. ISBN 0-7884-1927-7.
- Leigh Rayment's historical List of Members of the Irish House of Commons. Cites: Johnston-Liik, Edith Mary (2002). The History of the Irish Parliament 1692-1800 (6 volumes). Ulster Historical Foundation.
