= Robert King, 1st Baron Kingsborough =

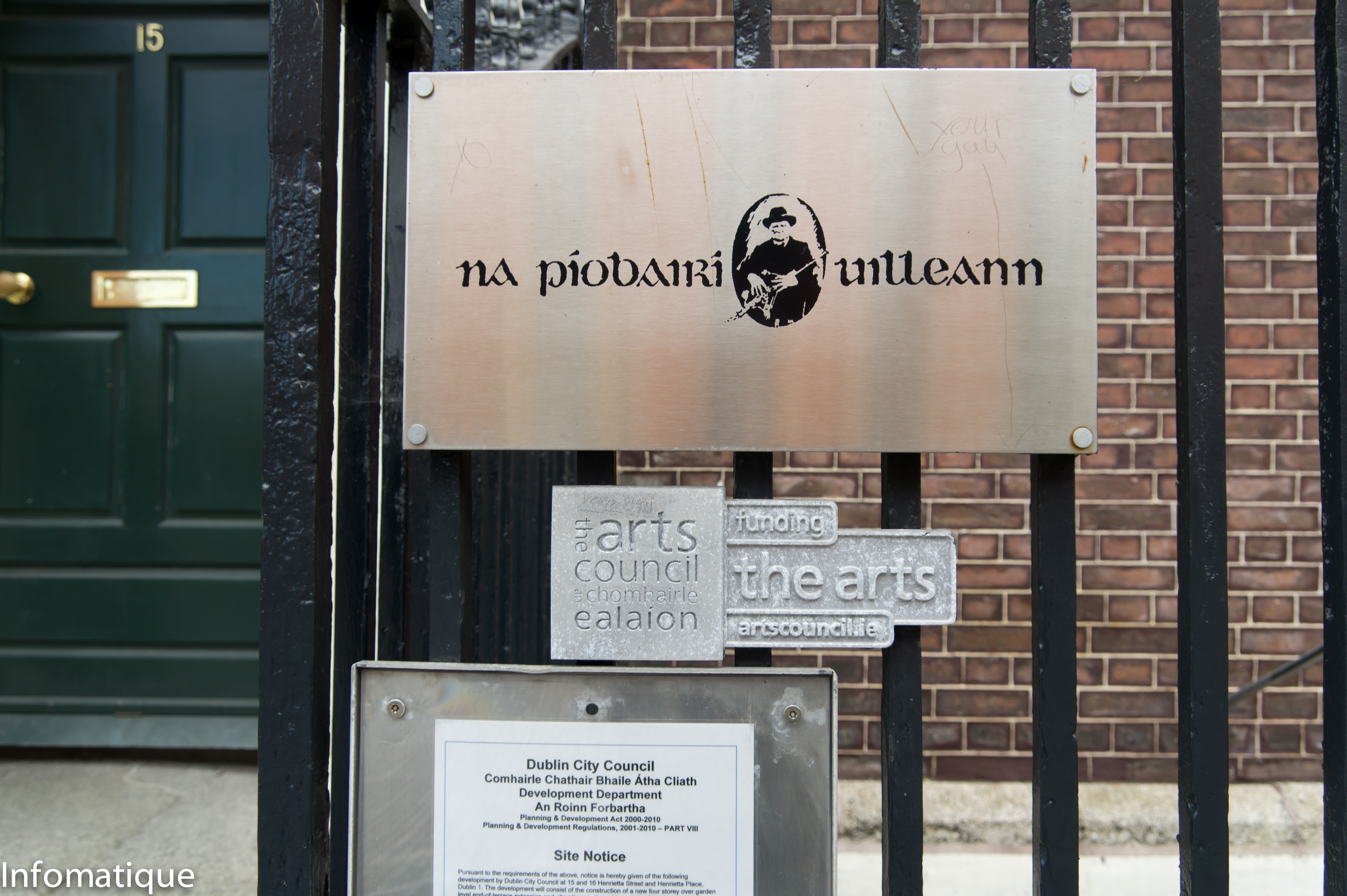
Town house 15 Henrietta Street, Dublin, August 2011

Robert King, 1st Baron Kingsborough (18 February 1724 – 22 May 1755), known as Sir Robert King, Bt, between 1740 and 1748, was an Irish landowner and politician.

King was the elder son of Sir Henry King, 3rd Baronet, by Isabella Wingfield, daughter of Edward Wingfield and sister of Richard Wingfield, 1st Viscount Powerscourt. He succeeded his father in the baronetcy in 1740. In 1744 he was returned to the Irish Parliament for Boyle, a seat he held until 1748, when, aged only 24, he was raised to the Irish peerage as Baron Kingsborough. He was also Custos Rotulorum of Roscommon.

Lord Kingsborough died in May 1755, aged 31. He never married and the barony died with him. He was succeeded in the baronetcy by his younger brother, Edward, who was created Earl of Kingston in 1768.

Parliament of Ireland
Preceded by Arthur French; Richard Wingfield	Member of Parliament for Boyle; 1744–1748; With: Arthur French	Succeeded by Arthur French; Edward King
Peerage of Ireland
New creation	Baron Kingsborough; 1748–1755	Extinct
Baronetage of Ireland
Preceded by Henry King	Baronet (of Boyle Abbey); 1740–1755	Succeeded by Edward King
