= Robert King (Roundhead) =

Irish soldier and statesman (c. 1599–1657)

Sir Robert King (c. 1599–1657) was an Irish soldier and statesman.

He was the eldest son of Sir John King (died 1637), Clerk of the Crown and Hanaper and MP for County Roscommon, and his wife Catherine Drury (died 1617), daughter of Robert Drury of Laughlin and Elizabeth Carew, and grand-niece of Sir William Drury, Lord President of Munster. His eight siblings included the writer Dorothy Durie and the poet Edward King, whose early death inspired John Milton to write the poem "Lycidas". His father, who emigrated from Yorkshire to Ireland in the 1580s, became an indispensable Crown servant and a major landowner with estates in twenty-one counties.

Robert was Muster Master-general and Clerk of the Cheque in Ireland. He was knighted in 1621 and sat as a Member of the Irish House of Commons for Boyle in the Parliaments of 1634 and 1639. He was an MP for County Roscommon in 1640. He was in England for much of 1642, and was sent to deal with Parliament's affairs in Ulster in 1645. King Charles I of England, distrustful of his loyalty, dismissed him as Muster Master-general. After the failure of the Royalist cause, he threw his influence in favour of Oliver Cromwell. He was a member of the Council of State in 1653 and sat in the First Protectorate Parliament for the counties of Sligo, Roscommon and Leitrim in 1654. He had a reputation as a political moderate, who was willing to work with any faction which would safeguard the interest of the Protestant party in Ireland.

He married firstly Frances Folliot, daughter of Henry Folliott, 1st Baron Folliott and Anne Strode, by whom he had at least two sons and one daughter. She died in 1638. He married secondly Sophia Zouch, daughter of Sir Edward Zouch, Knight Marshal of the King's Household and Dorothea Silking, a Danish royal lady-in-waiting to Queen Anne of Denmark, and widow of Edward Cecil, 1st Viscount Wimbledon, by whom he had a daughter, Elizabeth, who married Sir Thomas Barnardiston, 2nd Baronet.

He was succeeded by his eldest son and heir by his first wife, John, who became 1st Lord Kingston. His youngest son by Frances was Sir Robert King, 1st Baronet. Mary, his daughter by Frances, married firstly Sir William Meredyth, 1st Baronet and secondly William Feilding, 3rd Earl of Denbigh and had issue by both marriages. His widow outlived him by many years, dying in England in 1691, aged seventy-three.
