= John King, 1st Baron Kingston =

Anglo-Irish soldier

John King, 1st Baron Kingston (died 1676) was an Anglo-Irish soldier during the Wars of the Three Kingdoms who served the Commonwealth government during the Interregnum and government of Charles II after the Restoration.

== Biography ==
John King was the eldest son of Sir Robert King (1599?–1657), and his first wife, Frances, daughter of Sir Henry Folliott, 1st Lord Folliott of Ballyshannon and Anne Strode. His father, on going to England in 1642, entrusted him with the command of Boyle Castle, County Roscommon. His abilities as a leader were displayed on many occasions, particularly at the relief of Elphin Castle, and he continued very active during this time of confusion, and frequently disturbed Heber MacMahon, the Roman Catholic Bishop of Clogher then general of the Ulster army. By 1650, he was a member of Cromwell's army and on 11 June 1650, was instrumental in gaining the celebrated victory over the bishop's forces at the Battle of Scarrifholis, when he took the bishop prisoner by his own hand.

Parliament accorded him full powers, and on 26 July 1649 ordered him to be paid £100 from delinquents' estates "in consideration of long attendance". He was then a colonel. On 7 June 1658, he was knighted by Henry Cromwell, lord deputy-general of Ireland.

Having worked hard for the Restoration of Charles II, he was created on 4 September 1660 an Irish peer by the title of Baron Kingston, of Kingston in the County of Dublin, granted at Westminster on 4 September 1660, was sworn of the Privy Council of Ireland, and was appointed on 19 March 1660–1 a commissioner of the court of claims for the settlement of Ireland.

On 8 May 1661, he took his seat in the Irish House of Lords, on 11 May he was made commissary-general of the horse, and on 31 May was added to the committee appointed to consider the erection of a college of physicians in Dublin. On 15 November following he was appointed captain of a troop and on 20 April 1665, he was made colonel of a regiment of horse.

With John Berkeley, 1st Baron Berkeley of Stratton, King was constituted on 2 April 1666 joint Lord President of Connaught, and on 5 May following sole governor of that province. On 1 October 1670 he was appointed one of the commissioners to examine and state the arrears due to the king before the commencement of that year, of the farm of the revenue for seven years.

On 15 July 1674, had a grant by patent of a substantial yearly pension. It was also provided by the Act of Settlement 1662 that all his claims to land should be ratified and confirmed to him and his heirs. For his arrears of service before 5 June 1649 he received four several grants of land. By letters patent dated 25 January 1664, he had confirmed to him the town and lands of Kilcolman, with other lands, amounting to some thousands of acres, in the counties of Limerick, Cork, and Kildare. He died in 1676.

== Family ==
King married Catherine (died 1669), daughter of Sir William Fenton, of Mitchelstown, County Cork and Margaret Fitzgibbon, and left two sons, Robert (died. 1693) and John successively second and third Barons Kingston.

== Notes ==
Peerage of Ireland
New creation	Baron Kingston; 1660–1679	Succeeded by Robert King
