= Peter Ivers (United Irishmen) =

Peter Ivers (born 1774, Tinryland, County Carlow, Ireland) was a recruiter and strategist for the United Irishmen, a mass-membership organisation committed to, an ultimately insurrectionary, struggle against the British Crown and Protestant Ascendancy in Ireland for a representative national government. He was arrested on the eve of the Rebellion of 1798 and transported to Australia.

== United Irishman ==
Ivers was born in Tinryland, County Carlow, the only son of Jemmy Ivers. Listed as a carpet-maker, he was described as a young man of good education and of striking personality.

In the summer of 1797, the authorities issued a warrant for Ivers on the capital charge of administering the test, or membership pledge, of the Society of United Irishmen. Having despaired of either the Crown in London or the Ascendancy parliament in Dublin conceding reform, and in the hope of French assistance, Ivers was recruiting for a republican insurrection. He evaded arrest until March 1798 when, as the delegate for Carlow, he was arrested with 13 other members of the Leinster directory of the Society in the house of Oliver Bond in Dublin. Ivers had clearly made some impression upon the other members of the directory, as the password for their meeting had become "Is Ivers from Carlow come?". He was, however, responsible for their detection having placed trust in William Farrell, a government informer.

== Arrest and exile ==
The arrests, undertaken on the information of a government informer, crippled the United Irish leadership in the province and gravely affected the course and chances of success of the impending revolution. This was particularly the case in Carlow, where Ivers had been "the driving force behind the society" in the county.

While two members of the Directory were executed, Ivers was held in Kilmainham Gaol until 1799 when he was convicted of treason and sentenced to deportation. In August, he was transported on the Minerva to penal colony of New South Wales, landing in Sydney in January 1800, with his occupation listed as "weaver". Among the 234 convicts accompanying him, was Harold James, the first catholic priest to arrive in Australia's penal colonies. Ivers assisted at mass.

By August 1800, the authorities were convinced that rebel convicts who had arrived on the Minerva were preparing to take over the colony. Several arrests were made, and suspects were flogged to elicit further details of the plot. Harold, who shielded conspirators by claiming the sanctity of confession prevented such disclosure, was exiled to Norfolk Island.

Iver's role, if any, is unknown. He is believed to have adopted an alias in the colony. He was not among the United Irish convicts granted pardons in the wake of the Rum Rebellion of 1808, a coup d'état staged by the New South Wales Corps that deposed Governor William Bligh.
