= Robert King, 6th Earl of Kingston =

Anglo-Irish politician and peer

Robert King, 6th Earl of Kingston (17 July 1804 – 16 October 1869), styled The Honourable until 1854, was an Anglo-Irish politician and peer.

== Early life and education ==
He was the son of the 1st Viscount Lorton and Lady Frances Parsons, daughter of the 1st Earl of Rosse. He was educated at Trinity College Dublin, matriculating in 1823.

== Career ==
He represented County Roscommon in the House of Commons of the United Kingdom between 1826 and 1830, and served as High Sheriff of Roscommon in 1836. On 20 November 1854, he succeeded to his father's titles as Viscount Lorton. On 8 September 1869, he succeeded his cousin, the 5th Earl of Kingston, as the 6th Earl of Kingston, but died the following month.

== Personal life ==
He married Anne Gore-Booth, daughter of Sir Robert Newcomen Gore-Booth, 3rd Baronet and Hannah Irwin, on 7 December 1829. A son, Robert Edward, was born 18 October 1831, and they had a daughter, Frances Isabella Anna, who died 8 October 1890.

By the mid-1830s, King had suffered a stroke, largely due to the effects of his heavy drinking, and was "almost entirely under the influence of his wife", whose "high-living" was disliked by his father, Viscount Lorton. In 1846, she had formed a relationship with "dubious and insolvent French nobleman", Vicomte Ernest Valentin de Satgé St. Jean; when her son, Henry, was born 31 July 1848, King disowned the child, but he continued to live with his wife and her lover despite his father's protests. King's attempt to sue for divorce in 1850 failed due to his own extramarital affair, with his nursemaid and travelling companion Julie Imhoff, being established.

The King family "were driven to extraordinary lengths" in attempting to stop King's estranged wife and her French lover from gaining control of their property, and so, when on the death of the 7th Earl of Kingston on 21 June 1871, Henry (31 July 1848 – 13 January 1896) succeeded as 8th Earl- his "legitimacy... confirmed (as it could not be disproved) at the probate court in Dublin in 1870"- the "disastrously dispersed hereditary lands" did not come to him with the title.

Parliament of the United Kingdom
Preceded by Stephen Mahon; Arthur French	Member of Parliament for County Roscommon; 1826–1830; With: Arthur French	Succeeded by Arthur French; Owen O'Conor
Peerage of Ireland
Preceded by James King	Earl of Kingston; 1869	Succeeded by Robert King
Preceded by Robert King	Viscount Lorton; 1854–1869	Succeeded by Robert King
