= Sir John King, 2nd Baronet =

Irish politician and baronet

Sir John King
- 2nd Baronet King of Boyle Abbey
- Tenure: 1707–1720
- Predecessor: Sir Robert King, 1st Baronet
- Successor: Sir Henry King, 3rd Baronet
- Born: before 1681
- Died: 19 March 1720
- Spouse: Elizabeth Sankey
- Father: Sir Robert King, 1st Baronet
- Mother: Frances Gore

Sir John King, 2nd Baronet (born before 1681 – 19 March 1720) was an Anglo-Irish politician.

King was the eldest son of Sir Robert King, 1st Baronet and Frances Gore. He sat in the Irish House of Commons as the Member of Parliament for Boyle between 1695 and 1715. On 1 March 1707, he succeeded to his father's baronetcy.

He married Elizabeth Sankey, daughter of John Sankey and Eleanor Morgan, but the couple had no children. He was succeeded in his title by his younger brother, Sir Henry King, 3rd Baronet.

Parliament of Ireland
Preceded by William Handcock; Stephen Ludlow	Member of Parliament for Boyle; 1695–1715; With: Sir Edward Crofton, Bt (1695–1703); Sir Robert King, Bt (1703–07); Henry King (1707–15)	Succeeded by Sir Henry King, Bt; Robert Sandford
Baronetage of Ireland
Preceded by Robert King	Baronet (of Boyle Abbey); 1707–1720	Succeeded by Henry King
