= Robert King, 2nd Baron Kingston =

Anglo-Irish nobleman

Robert King, 2nd Baron Kingston (born circa 1657, died 1693) was an Anglo-Irish nobleman.

He was the eldest son of John King, 1st Lord Kingston and Catherine Fenton, daughter of Sir William Fenton, 1st Baronet. He graduated M.A. Brasenose College, Oxford, 1670. He endowed a college in County Roscommon in Ireland, to be called Kingston College.

During the opening stages War of the Two Kings Kingston took command of the Protestant forces raised in Sligo in defiance of James II. Following a series of defeats for the Protestants in Eastern Ulster, it was decided to abandon Sligo and withdraw towards Ballyshannon. During their march his men fought a skirmish with a force of Irish Army troops under Sir Connell Ferrall near Bundoran, driving them off and safely reaching Ballyshannon. Kingston garrisoned Ballyshannon but, after receiving orders from his superior Robert Lundy at Derry following the Protestant defeat at the Battle of Cladyford, he disbanded his forces and departed for Scotland. Most of the troops went to Enniskillen where they took part in the successful defence of the town.

He took his seat in the Irish House of Lords in 1692, but died in December of the following year. He married Margaret Harbord, daughter of the statesman William Harbord and his first wife Mary Duck, but had no issue. He was succeeded in the barony by his brother John.

== Bibliography ==
- Childs, John. The Williamite War in Ireland, 1688-1691. Continuum, 2007.

== Notes ==
Peerage of Ireland
Preceded by John King	Baron Kingston; 1679–1693	Succeeded by John King
