= Bob P. King =

American astronomy blogger

Robert P. King (known professionally as AstroBob), born August 9, 1953 (age 72), is an American photographer, writer, and an amateur astronomer. He publishes an astronomy blog called Astro Bob which is "widely read and respected" according to astronomer Bob Mizon.

== Early life and education ==
King grew up in the Chicago suburb Morton Grove, Illinois, and expressed a strong interest in astronomy since he was a boy. He joined the Chicago Astronomical Society and gave presentations there. He graduated with a teaching degree in the German language at University of Illinois at Urbana-Champaign.

== Career ==
King moved to Duluth, Minnesota in 1979 to become a photographer for the Duluth News Tribune and became a photo editor in 1990, retiring in 2018. The darker skies of Duluth helped him renew his interest in astronomy. He taught community education astronomy classes at the University of Minnesota Duluth and Marshall Alworth Planetarium since 1992 and astronomy classes at Boulder Lake Environmental Learning Center since 2011.

King started his Astro Bob blog in 2008 to share knowledge on astronomy events and discoveries from NASA. His articles have also been published online with Sky & Telescope and Universe Today.

He published his first book Night Sky With the Naked Eye in 2016. Emily Lakdawalla of The Planetary Society says the book contains "practical advice on photographing sky phenomena". His second book was reviewed in Astronomy Now.

== Books ==
- Bob King, Night Sky With the Naked Eye: How to Find Planets, Constellations, Satellites and Other Night Sky Wonders Without a Telescope, 2016, ISBN 978-1624143090
- Bob King, Wonders of the Night Sky You Must See Before You Die: The Guide to Extraordinary Curiosities of Our Universe, 2018, ISBN 978-1624144929
