= Arthur French (politician) =

Irish politician

Arthur French (1764 – 24 November 1820) was an Irish Whig politician.

He belonged to the long-established French family of Frenchpark, County Roscommon, who were substantial landowners who also made money in the wine trade. He was the eldest son of Arthur French, MP, and Alicia Magenis, daughter of Richard Magenis of Dublin and sister of Richard Magenis. He married Margaret Costello, daughter of Edmond Costello of Edmondstown, County Mayo, and had nine children, including Arthur French, 1st Baron de Freyne, John, 2nd Baron and Charles, 3rd Baron.

In 1783, he was elected a Member of Parliament (MP) for County Roscommon in the Irish House of Commons. After the Act of Union in 1801 he represented County Roscommon in the Parliament of the United Kingdom. He was alleged to have been offered an Earldom if he would support the Union of Ireland with Great Britain but refused the honour. Later he also refused a Barony with no strings attached, although in time three of his sons would hold the title Baron de Freyne. The Crown was frequently irritated by French's demands for offices and favours for his brothers and sons, although such behaviour was entirely typical of an Irish politician at the time.

A critic of the policy of collective fines as a deterrent to the illicit distillation of poteen, he incurred the wrath of Chief Secretary of Ireland Robert Peel who called him "an Abominable fellow", but his enormous popularity in Roscommon meant that he could not be ignored. He also criticized the continuation of martial law in Ireland.

By 1817 he was complaining of ill health: he died on 24 November 1820. One report at the time states that he had died "from excessive fox hunting".

Parliament of Ireland
Preceded by Edward Crofton; Maurice Mahon	Member of Parliament for County Roscommon; 1783–1800; With: Edward Crofton 1783–1798; George King, Viscount Kingsborough 1798–1799; Thomas Mahon 1799–1801	Succeeded by Parliament of the United Kingdom
Parliament of the United Kingdom
New constituency	Member of Parliament for County Roscommon; 1801–1820; With: Thomas Mahon 1801–1802; Edward King 1802–1806; Stephen Mahon 1806–1820	Succeeded by Arthur French; Stephen Mahon
