= Connell Ferrall =

Public Record of Ireland, Testamentary, Ardagh (parish in Longford) Admin. Bonds Sir Connell Ferrall was an Irish soldier of the seventeenth century noted for his service during the War of the Two Kings.

Ferrall was a Roman Catholic from Tirlickin in County Longford. He was a member of the Farrell clan by descent. Ferrall went into exile on the Continent following the Cromwellian conquest of Ireland. He served in the French Army leading a force of exiled Longford troops. However following the Treaty of Brussels between Charles II and the Spanish King, they changed sides and handed over control of the Flanders fortress town of Saint-Ghislain to the Spanish. In gratitude Charles knighted Connell and his cousin Lisagh O'Farrell. Although Charles recommended that Farrell should have lands granted to him after the Restoration, this was rejected by the Irish Parliament. Ferrall served, along with many other Irishmen, as part of Charles' garrison at English Tangier.

In the 1680s he was a supporter of the Catholic James II, he was a Jacobite serving in the Irish Army. Ferrall commanded a regiment based at Boyle, County Roscommon. He led a force of troops to try and stop Lord Kingston's withdrawing Protestant garrison of Sligo from reaching Ballyshannon, but they were driven back near Bundoran. He died at his home in Tirlicken, County Longford, in 1726.

== Bibliography ==
- Childs, John. The Williamite War in Ireland, 1688-1691. Continuum, 2007.
- D'Alton, John. King James's Irish Army List. The Celtic Bookshop, 1997
