= George King, 3rd Earl of Kingston =

Irish nobleman (1771–1839)

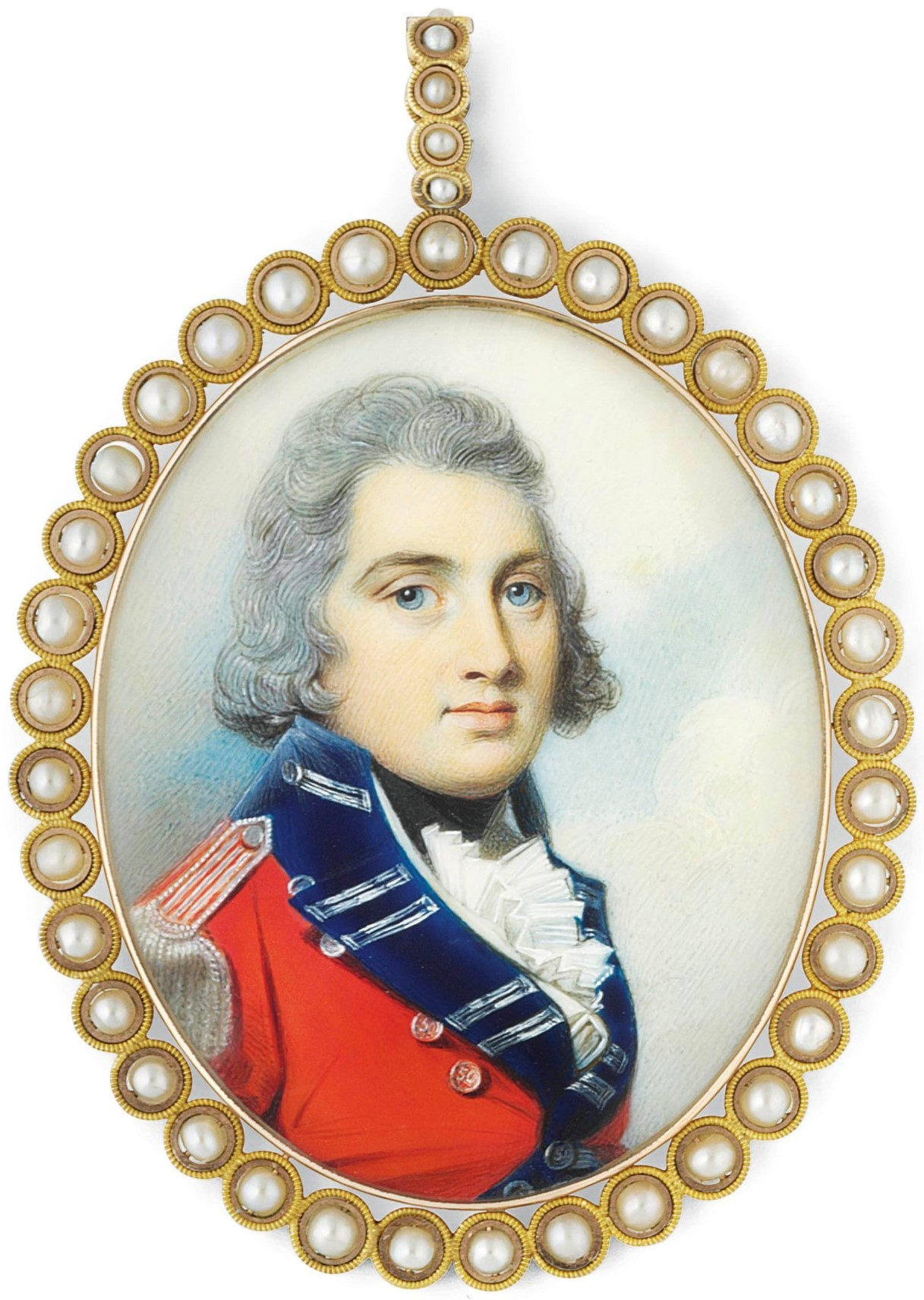
Portrait by George Engleheart, 1794

George King, 3rd Earl of Kingston (9 April 1771 – 18 October 1839), styled Viscount Kingsborough from 1797 to 1799, was an Irish nobleman.

He was the son of Robert King, 2nd Earl of Kingston of Mitchelstown Castle, who he succeeded in 1799.

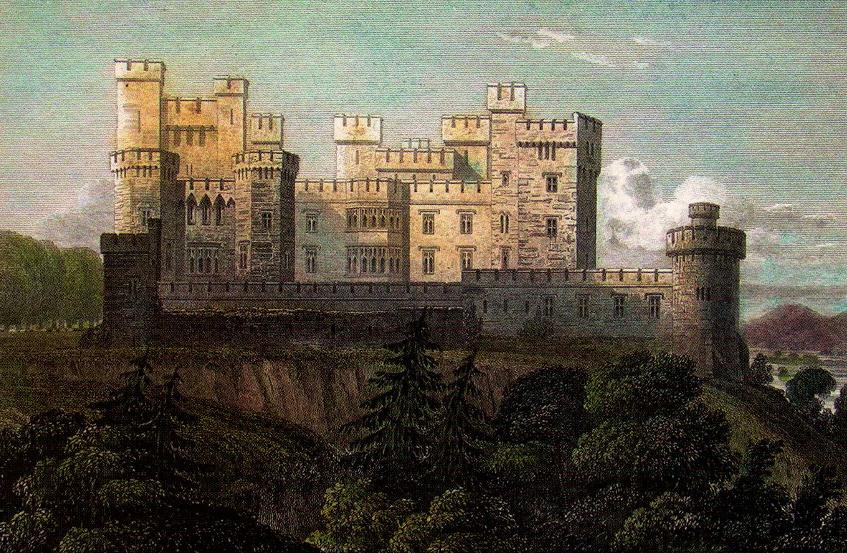
Early 19th century painting of the new Mitchelston Castle, now demolished

He was returned as a Member of the Irish House of Commons for County Roscommon in 1798, vacating the seat in the following year when he succeeded his father to the peerage and briefly taking his seat in the Irish House of Lords before it was abolished in 1800 after the union with Great Britain. He was created Baron Kingston in the Peerage of the United Kingdom in 1821, thus giving him and his descendants an automatic seat in the UK House of Lords.

In 1823, he demolished the existing Palladian house on the Mitchelstown estate and replaced it with a new castle designed by James and George Richard Pain. It had 60 principal and 20 minor bedrooms, a 100-foot-long (30 m) gallery, three libraries, morning room, dining room (which could seat 100 guests at one sitting) and various other facilities.

On 5 May 1794, he married Lady Helena, the daughter of Stephen Moore, 1st Earl Mount Cashell. They had six children:

- Edward King, Viscount Kingsborough (1795–1837), antiquarian who predeceased his father
- Robert King, 4th Earl of Kingston (1796–1867); his heir
- Hon. George King (20 August 1798 – 2 May 1801)
- James King, 5th Earl of Kingston (1800–1869)
- Lady Helena King (11 April 1801 – 9 May 1871), married Philip Davies-Cooke on 8 December 1829
- Lady Adelaide Charlotte King (c. 1813 - 1 August 1854), married Charles Tankerville Webber (died March 1854), son of Daniel Webb Webber, on 2 August 1834

George King's sister Margaret King married his wife's brother Stephen Moore, 2nd Earl Mount Cashell.

Parliament of Ireland
Preceded by Sir Edward Crofton; Arthur French	Member of Parliament for County Roscommon; 1798–1799; With: Arthur French	Succeeded by Arthur French; Thomas Mahon
Political offices
Preceded by The Earl of Rosse	Representative peer for Ireland; 1807–1839	Succeeded by The Lord Crofton
Peerage of Ireland
Preceded by Robert King	Earl of Kingston; 1799–1839	Succeeded by Robert King
Peerage of the United Kingdom
New creation	Baron Kingston; 1821–1839	Succeeded by Robert King
