= Edward King, 1st Earl of Kingston =

Anglo-Irish politician and peer

Edward King, 1st Earl of Kingston PC (I) (29 March 1726 – 8 November 1797) was an Anglo-Irish politician and peer.

== Biography ==
He was the second son of Sir Henry King, 3rd Baronet and Isabella Wingfield, daughter of Edward Wingfield. He had a twin sister Frances, who married Hans Widman Wood of Rosmead, County Westmeath and had issue, including Isabella. He sat in the Irish House of Commons as the Member of Parliament for Boyle between 1749 and 1760, before sitting for County Sligo from 1761 to 1764. In 1761 he was elected to be Grand Master of Masons in Ireland and their subordinate jurisdictions. On 22 May 1755 he succeeded to the family baronetcy following the premature death of his elder brother, Robert King, 1st Baron Kingsborough. On 15 July 1764 he was elevated to the Peerage of Ireland as Baron Kingston and assumed his seat in the Irish House of Lords. He was further honoured when he was made Viscount Kingston on 15 November 1766 and Earl Kingston on 25 August 1768, both also Irish peerages.

Lord Kingston held the office of Custos Rotulorum of Roscommon between 1772 and his death in 1797, and was made a member of the Privy Council of Ireland on 20 January 1794. He was a Freemason, who served two terms as Grand Master of the Grand Lodge of Ireland; between 1761 and 1763, and 1769 to 1770.

=== Marriage and issue ===
He married Jane Caulfeild, daughter of Thomas Caulfeild and Peggy Jordan, on 5 January 1752 and had seven children. He was succeeded in his titles by his eldest surviving son, Robert. His daughter Jane married Lawrence Parsons, 1st Earl of Rosse. Another daughter Frances married Thomas Tenison. of Kilronan Castle, County Roscommon: they were the parents of Edward King-Tenison, the Whig politician and pioneering photographer.

Parliament of Ireland
Preceded by Arthur French; Sir Robert King, Bt	Member of Parliament for Boyle; 1749–1760; With: Arthur French	Succeeded by Henry King; Benjamin Burton
Preceded by Benjamin Burton; Owen Wynne	Member of Parliament for County Sligo; 1761–1764; With: Owen Wynne	Succeeded by Paul Annesley Gore; Owen Wynne
Masonic offices
Preceded by Earl of Charleville	Grandmaster of the Grand Lodge of Ireland; 1761–1763	Succeeded by Earl of Westmeath
Preceded by Earl of Cavan	Grandmaster of the Grand Lodge of Ireland; 1769–1770	Succeeded by Marquess of Kildare
Peerage of Ireland
New creation	Earl of Kingston; 1768–1797	Succeeded by Robert King
New creation	Viscount Kingston; 1766–1797	Succeeded by Robert King
New creation	Baron Kingston; 1764–1797	Succeeded by Robert King
Baronetage of Ireland
Preceded by Robert King	Baronet (of Boyle Abbey); 1755–1797	Succeeded by Robert King
