= Robert King, 2nd Earl of Kingston =

Irish accused murderer and property developer

Robert King
- Earl of Kingston
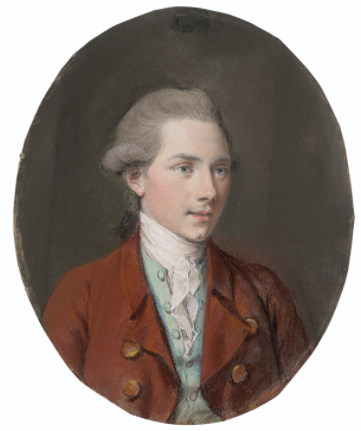
- Predecessor: Edward King
- Successor: George King
- Born: 1754
- Died: 17 April 1799 (aged 44–45)
- Spouse: Caroline FitzGerald

Robert King, 2nd Earl of Kingston (1754 – 17 April 1799) was an Anglo-Irish peer. He was styled Viscount Kingsborough between 1768 and 1797. He achieved notoriety in 1798 when tried and acquitted by his peers in the Irish House of Lords for murder of his nephew Henry Fitzgerald. Fitzgerald had eloped with his daughter Mary.

== Biography ==
He was the eldest surviving son of Edward King, 1st Earl of Kingston and Jane Caulfeild. From 1767 to 1768 he was educated at Eton College. He sat in the Irish House of Commons as the Member of Parliament for Boyle from 1776 to 1783, and for County Cork between 1783 and 1797, and served as a Governor of County Cork in 1789. In 1797 he succeeded to his father's titles and assumed his seat in the Irish House of Lords. Between 1797 and his death he was Custos Rotulorum of Roscommon.

On 18 May 1798, he was tried by his peers in the Irish House of Lords after allegedly murdering his nephew Colonel Henry Gerald FitzGerald. FitzGerald was a married man who eloped with King's daughter Mary, and had submitted to an inconclusive duel with her brother Robert. Public sympathy was on King's side and when after three summonses no witnesses came forward he was acquitted. The Lord Chancellor pronounced the verdict, broke his wand and dismissed the assembly.

=== Family ===
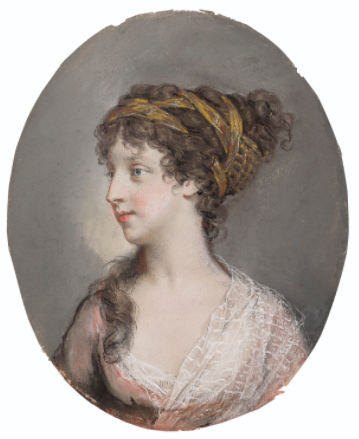
Caroline, née Fitzgerald, Countess of Kingston

He married Caroline FitzGerald, daughter of Richard FitzGerald and Margaret King, on 5 December 1769, from whom he later separated. Together they had nine children:

- Hon. John King (died young)
- Hon. Mary King
- George King, Viscount Kingsborough (28 April 1771 – 18 October 1839), succeeded to his father's titles and married Lady Helena Moore, daughter of Stephen Moore, 1st Earl Mountcashell
- Lady Margaret King (1773 – 29 January 1835), writer, married 1st Stephen Moore, 2nd Earl Mountcashell and 2nd George William Tighe, agricultural theorist
- Hon. Robert King (12 August 1773 – 20 November 1854), raised to the peerage as Viscount Lorton, married Lady Frances Parsons, daughter of Laurence Parsons, 1st Earl of Rosse
- Hon. Edward King (1774 – 14 February 1848)
- Hon. Henry King (1776 – 26 November 1839), married Mary Hewitt
- Hon. Richard FitzGerald King (8 April 1779 – 22 September 1856), married Williamina Ross
- Lady Jane Diana King (1780 - 9 April 1838), married 1st Count Wintzingerode (1778-1856), foreign minister of the king of Württemberg; 2nd General John de Ricci.

A Naval Biographical Dictionary (1849) by William Richard O'Byrne states that Robert King had a sixth son, James William, who became a rear-admiral in 1846. He married Caroline Cleaver, daughter of the Archbishop of Dublin; one of their daughters was the prominent evangelist Catherine King Pennefather.

Parliament of Ireland
Preceded by Richard Fitzgerald; Henry King	Member of Parliament for Boyle; 1776–1783; With: Henry King	Succeeded by Peter Metge; Henry King
Preceded by Richard Townsend; James Bernard	Member of Parliament for County Cork; 1783–1797; With: James Bernard (1783–1791); Abraham Morris (1791–1797); Viscount Boyle (1797)	Succeeded by Robert Uniacke Fitzgerald; Viscount Boyle
Peerage of Ireland
Preceded by Edward King	Earl of Kingston; 1797–1799	Succeeded by George King
