= Gelasius Ó Cuileanáin =

Gelasius Ó Cuileanáin (or Glaisne O'Cullenan) was a Cistercian Abbot of Boyle, Ireland and one of the Irish Catholic Martyrs.

== Biography ==
He was born probably near Assaroe Abbey, at Ballyshannon, County Donegal. Three of his brothers were Cistercian abbots, and a fourth Bishop of Raphoe. Gelasius, the eldest, studied at Salamanca University in Spain, went thence to Paris where he took his doctorate at the Sorbonne, made his monastic profession, and was created Abbot of Boyle, County Roscommon.

This abbey had been confiscated and granted to Cusack, Sheriff of Meath; but the Irish regulars continued to appoint superiors to the suppressed houses. The young abbot went immediately to Ireland and is said to have obtained restoration of his abbey. He was, however, seized at Dublin by the Government and imprisoned in Dublin Castle with Premonstratensian Eugene O'Mulkeeran, Abbot of Holy Trinity Abbey upon Lough Key. Refusing to conform to the State-controlled Church of Ireland, they were tortured and finally hanged outside the walls of Dublin, 21 November 1580. O'Cullenan's body was spared mutilation through his friends' intercession. His clothes were divided as a martyr's relics among the Catholics.
