= Sir Robert King, 1st Baronet =

Anglo-Irish politician

Sir Robert King PC (Ire)
- 1st Baronet King of Boyle Abbey
- Tenure: 1682–1707
- Predecessor: New creation
- Successor: Sir John King, 2nd Baronet
- Born: c. 1625
- Died: March 1707 (aged 81–82)
- Spouse: Frances Gore
- Issue: Sir John King, 2nd Baronet; Sir Henry King, 3rd Baronet
- Father: Sir Robert King
- Mother: Hon. Frances Folliott

Sir Robert King, 1st Baronet PC (I) (circa 1625 – March 1707) was an Anglo-Irish politician.

== Biography ==
King was the second son of Sir Robert King and his first wife, Frances Folliott, daughter of Henry Folliott, 1st Baron Folliott and Anne Strode. He represented the seat of Ballyshannon in the Irish House of Commons between 1661 and 1666. On 27 September 1682, he was created a Baronet, of Boyle Abbey, in the Baronetage of Ireland. He sat for County Roscommon from 1692 to 1693 and again from 1696 to 1699. In 1695, he was made a member of the Privy Council of Ireland. He finally sat for Boyle between 1703 and his death in 1707.

He married Frances Gore, daughter of Lt-Col Henry Gore and Mary Blayney. He was succeeded by his eldest son, John King. A descendant of his second son, Henry King, was created Earl of Kingston in 1768.

Parliament of Ireland
Preceded by Patriot Parliament	Member of Parliament for County Roscommon; 1692 – 1699; With: George St George	Succeeded by George St George; Sir Edward Crofton, Bt
Preceded by Sir Edward Crofton, Bt; John King	Member of Parliament for Boyle; 1703 – 1707; With: John King	Succeeded by Sir Henry King, Bt; John King
Baronetage of Ireland
New creation	Baronet (of Boyle Abbey); 1682–1707	Succeeded by John King
