= Boyle Abbey =

Ruined Cistercian abbey in Roscommon, Ireland

- Mainistir na Búille
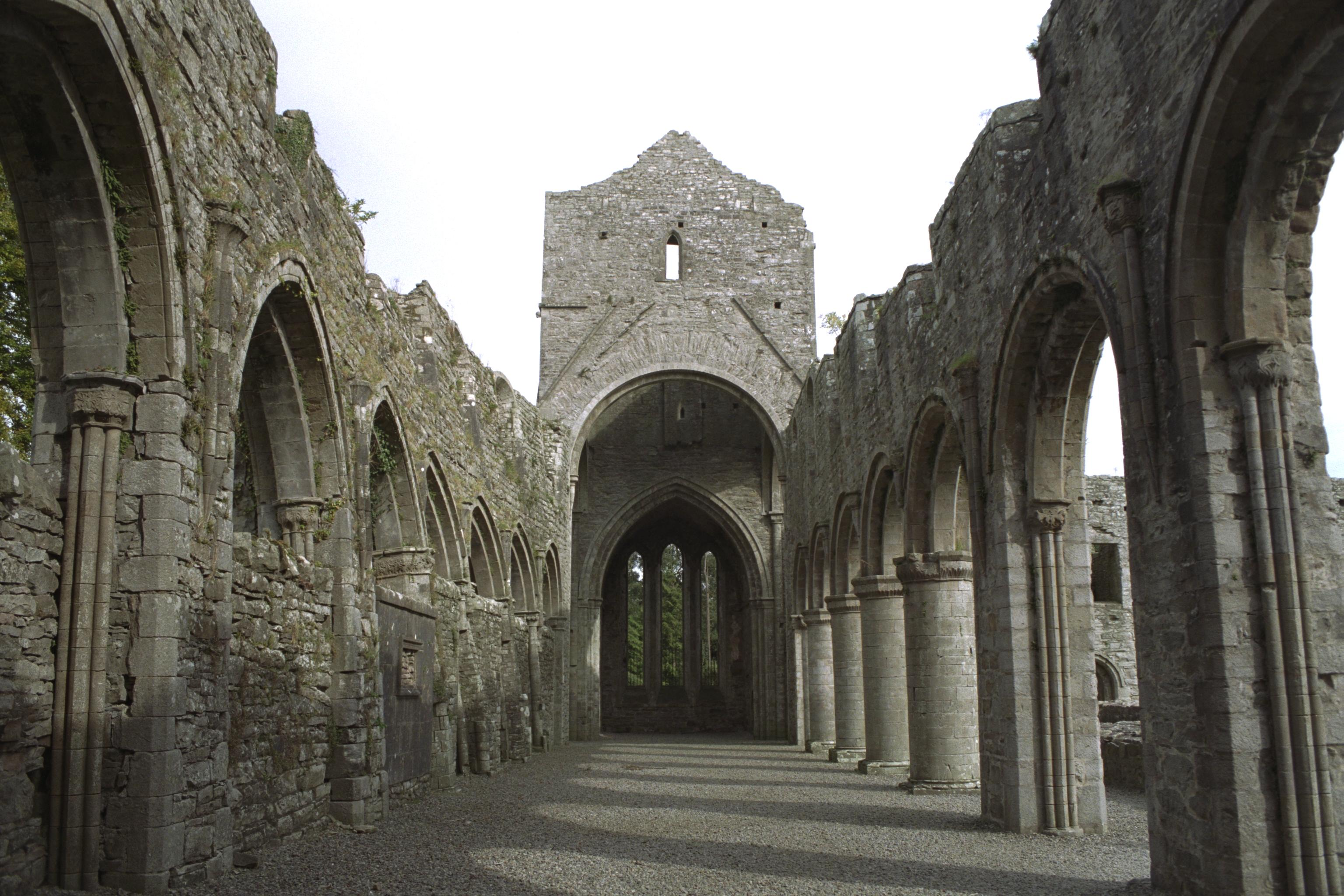
- The interior of Boyle Abbey, looking east through the nave

- Location within Ireland
- Interactive map of Boyle Abbey

Monastery information
- Order: Cistercians
- Established: 1218
- Disestablished: 1592
- Diocese: Elphin

People
- Founder: Mac Diarmada family

Architecture
- Status: Inactive
- Style: Cistercian

Site
- Location: Boyle, County Roscommon, Ireland
- Coordinates: 53°58′25″N 8°17′49″W
- Public access: Yes

Boyle Abbey (Irish: Mainistir na Búille) is a ruined Cistercian friary located in Boyle, County Roscommon, Ireland. It was founded by Saint Malachy in the year 1161 but not consecrated until 1218 (work was interrupted by the Anglo-Norman invasion of Ireland and it was burned in 1202.).

== History ==
In the 12th century, Saint Malachy became aware of two new monastic orders in France, the Cistercians and the Augustinians, and he decided to introduce both orders to Ireland in an effort to reform the old Irish church which he felt had fallen out of line with much of the rest of Christian Europe.

The first Cistercian Abbey was founded at Mellifont, County Louth in 1142. St Malachy made arrangements that young aspirant Irish men who want to become Cistercians should be trained in St Bernard’s own monastery of Clairvaux or one of its daughter houses.

The Cistercians were invited to found an abbey in Moylurg as a daughter house of Mellifont. In 1148 Peter O’Mordha and twelve companions were sent to Connaught.<Annals of Boyle><1148> They tried Grellachdinach, Buniffi and Drumcunny before settling at Boyle. The monks being vegetarian required an amount of arable land adjacent to a monastery as well as the facility to be able to channel running water to the establishment. They were offered the Celtic monastery called Eas Mic nEirc or Assylin near a major river crossing called of Ath-Da-Larg or ‘the ford with two forks’, where roads leading north, south, east and west all converged. This monastery had either very few monks or none at all. Little is known of this monastery, beyond two references in the various annals and a visit by Saint Columba in 560.<Admmanan><Life of St Columba> So Taoiseach McGreevy, a local chieftain, negotiated and gave this Celtic monastery in "pure free and perpetual alms" (no strings attached) to the Cistercians. (Documentary evidence shows that the McGreevy's were still in this district one hundred years later, ca. 1258.)

The Cistercians were welcomed and over many years were given land grants of about 50,000 acres (200 km2) scattered west of the River Shannon in 27 out-farms called granges. The Cistercians found the site of Assylin unsuitable owing to its geography, it is a height above the river and eventually built on the present site a few kilometres to the east which was more conducive to their plans which dictated that running water should be on the site for cooking, washing and toilet requirements. It was also more suitable for essential ancillary facilities such as mills and fish ponds, one of which existed until relatively recent times.

Boyle Abbey was founded in 1161.

The monastery prospered in the initial period, they made two foundations: Knockmoy Abbey in County Galway, and Assaroe Abbey in County Donegal. It had been raised to the status of Abbey by 1174. <Annals of Lough Ce><1174> However the abbey buildings took much time and were not completed until ca. 1218 when the abbey was consecrated. This was due in part to the events of 1202 when during a war initiated over the succession to the kingship of Connaught, the abbey was occupied and very badly damaged. The evidence for this may be seen in the architecture, with differing styles in various parts of the church. The history continued to be full of incident, in the 1220s Boyle became involved in what was termed ‘The Conspiracy of Mellifont’ when that abbey and its various daughter houses attempted to break away from Norman control.<B.W. O'Dwyer><Letters from Ireland 1228-9> After that was resolved the abbey was attacked on a number of occasions such as 1235 <Annals of Connaught><1235> and 1284 <Annals of the Four Masters><1284>. However with the advent of the various orders of friars in Ireland, the Franciscans, Dominicans, Augustinians and others, who offered a different style of life, more in keeping with the local culture, the number of lay brothers, who worked the granges, declined and this resulted in many of the granges being leased out. The life of the abbey seems to have gone on as normal, in the late 13th and early 14th centuries its abbots were regularly made bishops of Elphin. However, by the end of the 15th century, the family of the local chieftains appear to have taken control of the abbey, one of their number regularly becoming abbot. <Annals of Lough Cé><1555>

When the abbey was suppressed under Queen Elizabeth and the remaining assets given away, the new owner of Boyle Abbey was Patrick Cusack of Gerrardston, County Meath. He was granted the abbey's lands and possessions in 1569, though the Cistercian monks were initially permitted to remain. The last abbot Gelasius O’Cullenan was executed in Dublin in 1580.

In 1589 a lease was granted to William Ussher, and it was subsequently leased to Sir John King in 1603.

== Architecture ==
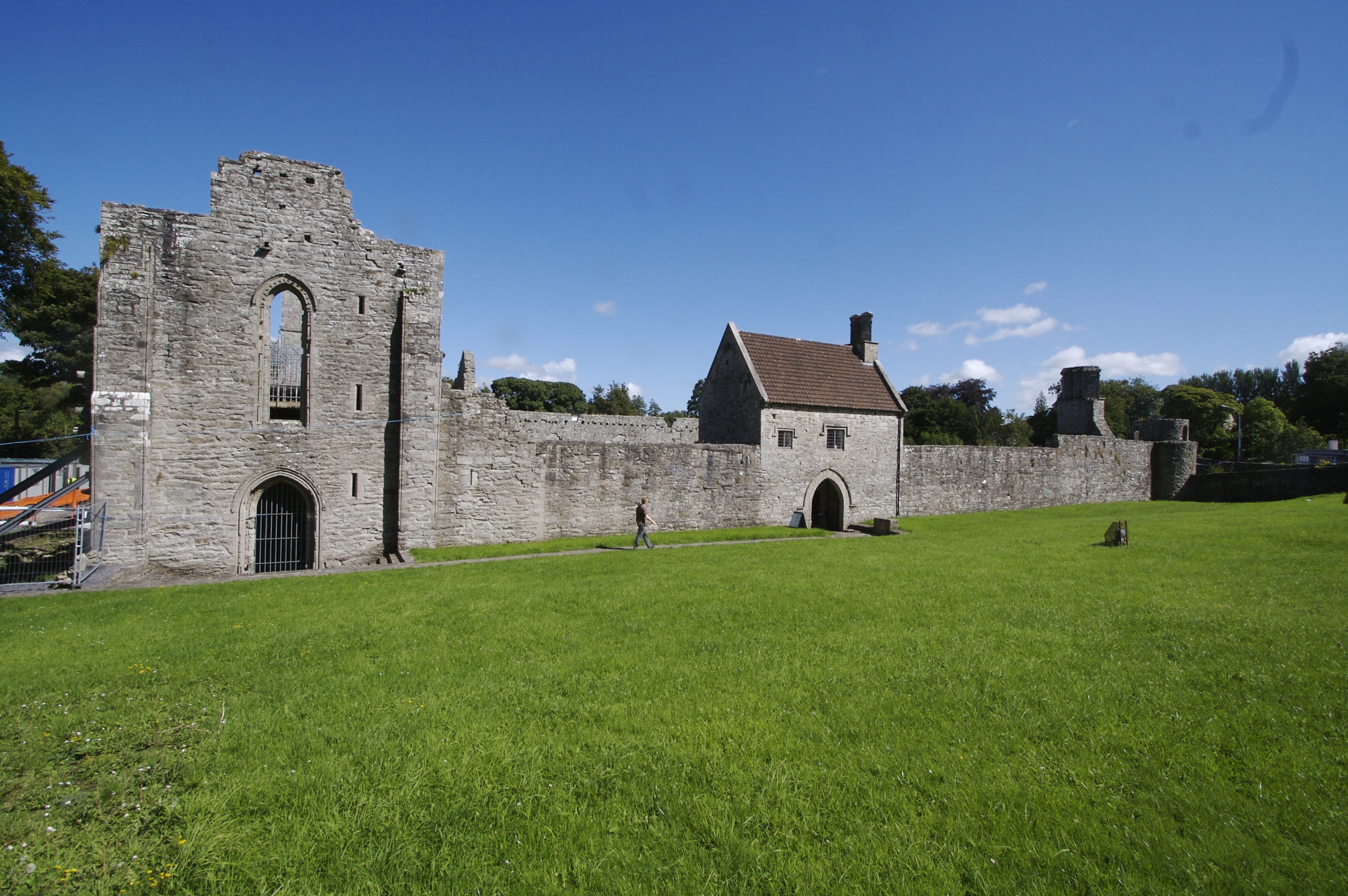

The monastery was laid out according to the usual Cistercian plan, a church on the north side of a roughly rectangular cloister, with a chapter house for meetings of the monks on the second side, a kitchen and a refectory on the third, and probably storehouses and dormitory above on the fourth. Only small parts of the cloister survive, as it was turned into a barracks by the Elizabethans in 1592, and again by the Cromwellians who besieged it in 1645.

This, along with possible later stone quarrying, resulted in little of the cloister-garth surviving. Despite this, the ruins are impressive, dominated by a squat square tower that was added above the crossing sometime in the thirteenth century. The church adheres to the Cistercian canon in having a nave with side aisles, a transept to the north and south of the crossing, each with a pair of chapels in the east wall, and a chancel, whose original windows were replaced in the thirteenth century. The design was influenced by styles from Burgundy, from whence the Cistercians came to Ireland, but much of the detailing of the nave and particularly the cylindrical piers of the south arcade has strong echoes of the West of England. The decorated corbels and capitals belonging to them were probably carved by local masons, some of them members of the so-called ‘School of the West’, creating some of the most inventive architectural sculpture of the early thirteenth century in the West of Ireland.

== Today ==
The Abbey is now a national monument in state care. Admission is inexpensive, with a family pass costing only 16 euro. It is located in Boyle, County Roscommon.

== Australian connection. ==
A small piece of stone from the Abbey was carried to the other side of the world and placed on the monumental headstone of an Irishman Bartholomew Higgins in the Rookwood Necropolis in Sydney, Australia.

== See also ==
- List of abbeys and priories in Ireland (County Roscommon)
