= Robert King, 1st Viscount Lorton =

Anglo-Irish peer and politician

The Viscount Lorton

Member of Parliament for Boyle
- In office 1798 – 1 January 1801 Serving with Henry King
- Preceded by: Henry King

Member of Parliament for Jamestown
- In office 1796–1798 Serving with Arthur Wolfe
- Preceded by: Arthur Wolfe; Henry Wood
- Succeeded by: Gilbert King; John King

Personal details
- Born: 12 August 1773 London, Kingdom of Great Britain
- Died: 20 November 1854 (aged 81) Rockingham Castle, Northamptonshire, United Kingdom of Great Britain & Ireland
- Resting place: Boyle, County Roscommon
- Spouse: Lady Frances Parsons
- Relations: Margaret King (sister)
- Parent(s): Robert King, 2nd Earl of Kingston; Caroline Fitzgerald
- Education: Exeter College, Oxford; Eton College

Military service
- Allegiance: Kingdom of Great Britain
- Branch/service: (Kingdom of Great Britain) British Army
- Years of service: 1792-96
- Rank: General
- Battles/wars: War of the First Coalition: Invasion of Guadeloupe (1794); Battle of Martinique (1794); Battle of Pointe-à-Pitre

General Robert Edward King, 1st Viscount Lorton (12 August 1773 – 20 November 1854), styled The Honourable from 1797 to 1800, was an Anglo-Irish peer and politician. He was notable for his strong support for anti-Catholic policies and his close association with the Orange Order.

== Family ==
Born in London at his parents' town house, he was the third child and second son of Robert King, 2nd Earl of Kingston by his wife, the heiress Caroline Fitzgerald. His mother's fortune (via her own mother) had made the Kings perhaps the richest family in Ireland for some time. His sister was Margaret King and one of the family governesses was Mary Wollstonecraft.

On 9 December 1799, he married his first cousin Lady Frances Parsons, daughter of Laurence Harman Parsons, 1st Earl of Rosse and Lady Jane King (herself a daughter of the first Earl of Kingston). They had several children together, including two sons and five daughters. The elder son succeeded to the earldom, after three cousins died childless or unmarried. The younger son founded the line of King-Harman, producing a family historian of the King family and their estates.

== Scandal 1798 ==
After a period of service in the army beginning 1792, Robert King achieved some notoriety when he was tried in April 1798 at the Cork Assizes for the murder of his illegitimate cousin (or maternal half-uncle) Colonel Henry Gerald FitzGerald, for seducing his sister. He was acquitted as no witnesses came forward. (His father was likewise acquitted by the Irish House of Lords). There was considerable sympathy for the King family, because Fitzgerald was raised by the Kings; his actions were thus severally discreditable, being viewed as gross ingratitude, a breach of family trust, incest, as well as simply dishonourable behaviour. For details of the story, Claire Tomalin's account in her biography of Mary Wollstonecraft is as good as any. Other accounts can be found online. Tomalin believes Henry FitzGerald to have been an illegitimate son of Richard Fitzgerald MP (father of Caroline, and grandfather of Viscount Lorton); other accounts claim that he was in fact the illegitimate son of Caroline's half-brother Gerald Fitzgerald).

== Career ==
This scandal did not affect Robert King's career; he represented Jamestown in the Irish House of Commons from 1796 to 1798, and was subsequently a Member of Parliament for Boyle until the Act of Union in 1801. His family's political influence probably bought him not only his seat but also his Irish peerage. In military life, he had distinguished himself in battle, and he was promoted to major-general in 1808, lieutenant-general in 1813, and finally general in 1830. Although successful in his chosen career, he appears to have made little mark in military history, compared to other Anglo-Irish noblemen such as Arthur Wellesley, 1st Duke of Wellington or Eyre Coote, or the earlier Lord Cornwallis. In Parliament he became known as a virulent anti-Catholic and was the leading Orangeman in Ireland during his lifetime.

== Honours and successors ==
Robert King had already been created Baron Erris of Boyle, in the County of Roscommon on 29 December 1800 in the Peerage of Ireland, and was raised to become Viscount Lorton, of Boyle, in the County of Roscommon on 28 May 1806. He was elected as an Irish representative peer in 1823 and was made Lord Lieutenant of Roscommon between 1831 and 1854, a purely ceremonial honour but an important one. He died on 20 November 1854 at Rockingham Castle. His elder son, Robert King, 2nd Viscount Lorton, succeeded to the Earldom of Kingston on the death of his cousin in 1869. The titles have remained united ever since.

His younger son, Lawrence (later King-Harman), inherited the Rockingham and Newcastle estates. The Rockingham estate was inherited by Edward Robert King-Harman, an MP and, earlier in his life, adventurer. His daughter, Frances, married Rt Hon Sir Thomas Stafford, 1st Baronet, a physician and member of the Irish Privy Council. Their granddaughter, Joan, Lady Dunn is the representative of the Rockingham branch of the family.

The Newcastle estates were inherited by Lawrence's younger son, the ancestor of Tony King-Harman, the historian of the King family referred to above.

Parliament of Ireland
Preceded by Arthur Wolfe; Henry Wood	Member of Parliament for Jamestown; 1796–1798; With: Arthur Wolfe	Succeeded by Gilbert King; John King
Preceded by Henry King	Member of Parliament for Boyle; 1798 – 1801; With: Henry King	Succeeded by Parliament of the United Kingdom
Political offices
Preceded by The Earl Mount Cashell	Representative peer for Ireland; 1823–1854	Succeeded by The Viscount Doneraile
Honorary titles
New title	Lord Lieutenant of Roscommon; 1831–1854	Succeeded by The Lord de Freyne
Peerage of Ireland
New creation	Viscount Lorton; 1806–1854	Succeeded by Robert King
New creation	Baron Erris; 1800–1854	Succeeded by Robert King
