= County Roscommon (Parliament of Ireland constituency) =

Pre-1801 Irish constituency

- Former county constituency for the Irish House of Commons
- County: County Roscommon

1611–1801
- Seats: 2
- Replaced by: County Roscommon

County Roscommon was a constituency represented in the Irish House of Commons from 1611 to 1800.

== Members of Parliament ==
- 1585 Sir Richard Bingham and Thomas Dillon
- 1613–1615 Sir John King and Sir Oliver St John
- 1634–1635 Sir Lucas Dillon
- 1639–1649 Sir Lucas Dillon and Henry (or Geoffrey) Dillon and Robert King
- 1654 (Protectorate Parliament) Sir Robert King
- 1657 (Protectorate Parliament) James King
- 1661 April–December Sir Charles Coote (replaced 1662 by George Lane) and Richard Jones.

=== 1689–1801 ===
Election	First MP	Second MP
1689	Charles Kelly	John Bourke
1692	Sir Robert King, 1st Bt	George St George
1703	Sir Edward Crofton, 2nd Bt	George St George
November 1713	Sir Edward Crofton, 2nd Bt	James Donnellan
1713	Sir Edward Crofton, 2nd Bt	Sir George St George, 2nd Bt
1715	Sir Edward Crofton, 2nd Bt	Sir John King, 2nd Bt
1721	Sir Edward Crofton, 2nd Bt	Arthur French
1727	Sir Edward Crofton, 2nd Bt	Sir Henry King, 3rd Bt
1730	Nicholas Mahon	Sir Henry King, 3rd Bt
1735	Edward Crofton	Sir Henry King, 3rd Bt
1741	Edward Crofton	Henry Sandford
1745	John French	Henry Sandford
1761	John French	Thomas Mahon
1775	Edward Crofton	Thomas Mahon
1782	Edward Crofton	Maurice Mahon
1783	Edward Crofton	Arthur French
1798	George King, Viscount Kingsborough	Arthur French
1799	Thomas Mahon	Arthur French
1801	Constituency replaced by Westminster constituency County Roscommon	
