= Holy Trinity Church, Cork =

Holy Trinity Church
- Father Mathew Memorial Church
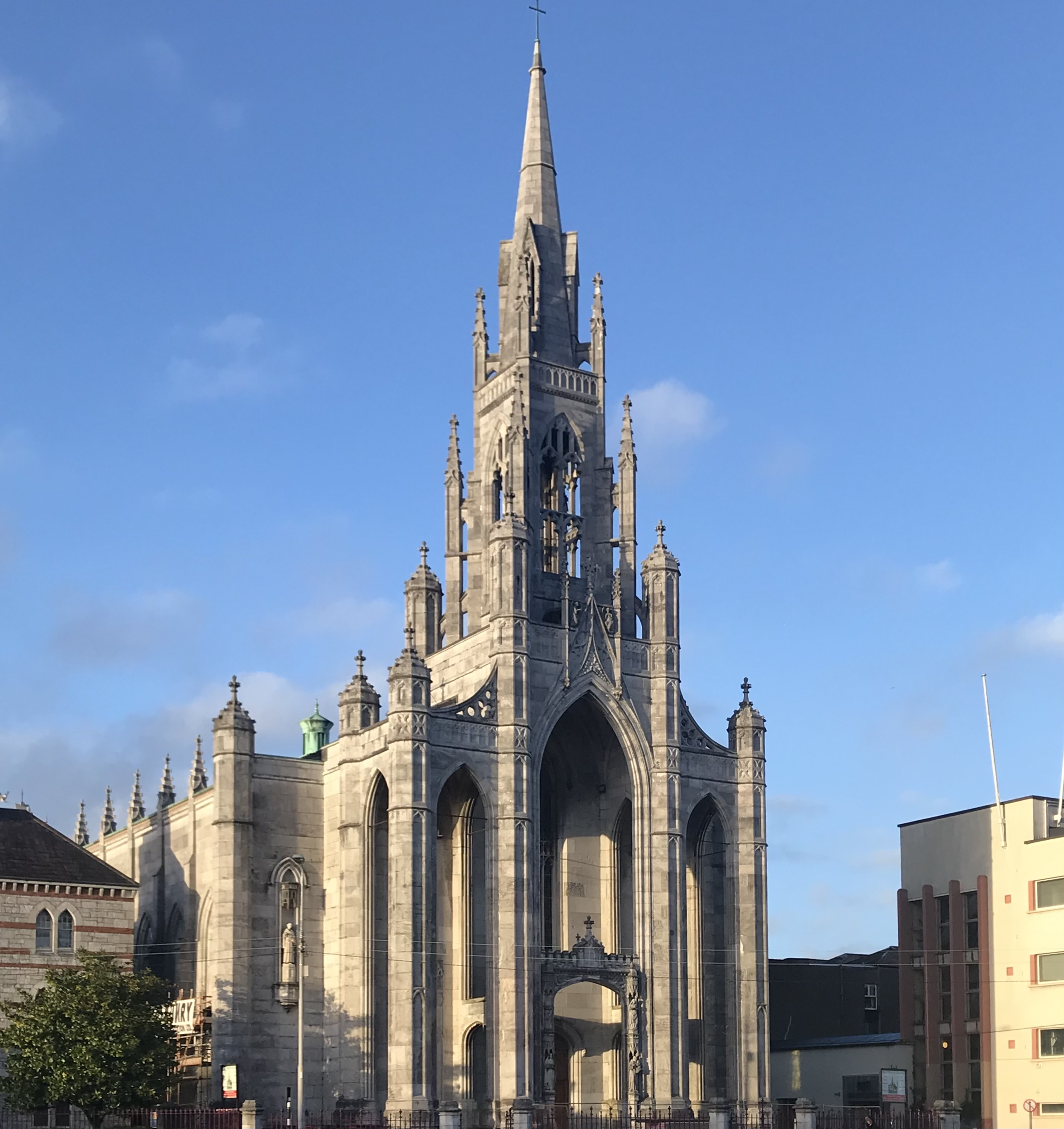

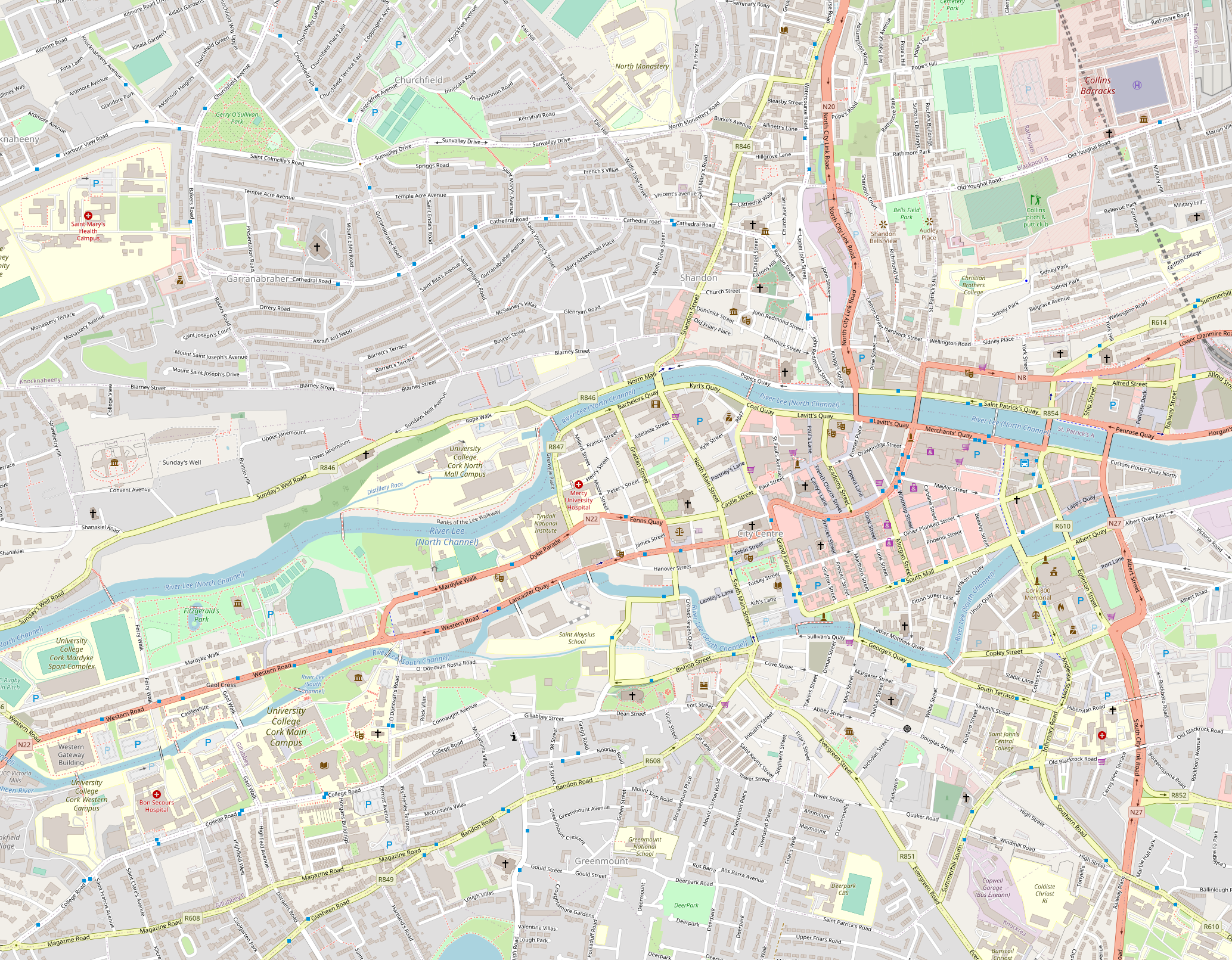
- Location within Cork Central
- 51.895553°N 8.4708917°W
- Location: Cork
- Country: Ireland
- Denomination: Catholic
- Religious order: Capuchin
- Website: www.capuchinfranciscans.ie/cork/

History
- Status: Church
- Dedication: Theobald Mathew

Architecture
- Functional status: Active
- Architect(s): George Pain, Dominic Coakley, George Ashlin
- Style: Gothic Revival
- Years built: 1832–1890
- Groundbreaking: 10 October 1832
- Completed: 13 October 1890

Specifications
- Materials: Limestone

Administration
- Archdiocese: Cashel and Emly
- Diocese: Cork and Ross
- Parish: SS Peter & Paul's

Holy Trinity Church, also known as Father Mathew Memorial Church, is a Roman Catholic Gothic Revival church and friary on Fr. Mathew Quay, on the bank of the River Lee in Cork. It belongs to the Order of Friars Minor Capuchin and is the only church dedicated to Father Theobald Mathew.

The building's listing in the National Inventory of Architectural Heritage describes it as a "Regency Gothic-style church with Gothic-Revival portico", and it is "one of the first large churches in the south of Ireland to be built in this style." Construction of the church began in the early 1830s but stalled shortly before the Great Famine. It would only be completed in 1890, in time for the centenary of the birth of Fr. Mathew. The church features several noteworthy stained glass windows, including three by Harry Clarke's studio and a large memorial to Daniel O'Connell.

== Background ==
The Capuchin Order arrived in Cork in 1637, thirteen years after the first Capuchin Community in Ireland was established in Dublin. The Cork friary was destroyed at some point in the seventeenth century. Father Bartholomew Mortell subsequently opened a hospice in the city. Most Catholics, including the Capuchins, were expelled from Cork by Murrough O'Brien, 1st Earl of Inchiquin in 1644, but the friary was reopened five years later, in 1649. This establishment was likely located on the same site as the later South Friary, on Blackamoor Lane, in what is now Cork's South Parish. The South Friary was built in 1771 by the Capuchin preacher Father Arthur O'Leary. O'Leary described the church as "remarkable for its dwarfish dimensions, its utter want of architectural grace, and its perfect seclusion from the public gaze".

The Capuchin and temperance reformer Theobald Mathew arrived in Cork in 1814 and became an active social crusader, working to improve the conditions of the city's poor. Father Mathew resolved to replace the cramped South Friary with a new church, and a committee was established to oversee the planning. A competition was held in 1825, and the plan by architect George Richard Pain — who also designed Blackrock Castle and the courthouse on Washington Street — was chosen. Pain, a former apprentice of the architect John Nash, was awarded the contract for £50.

== Construction ==
The city authorities offered a site on Sullivan's Quay, facing across the River Lee's south channel to the Grand Parade. For reasons that are uncertain, Mathew declined and opted for a site on Charlotte Quay, now Fr. Mathew Quay. This required the marshy ground on Morrison's Island to be drained and a foundation be built to bear the church's weight. The preparation of the site cost almost £1,600. It was estimated that the church would cost £10,000 to build, half of which was raised by the citizens of Cork. The simultaneous construction of two other churches — St. Patrick's on the Lower Glanmire Road, by Pain and his brother James Pain, and the Dominican St. Mary's on Pope's Quay by Thomas and Kearns Deane — meant that the architects were competing for funds at a time when the city was stricken by a cholera outbreak. A further £4,500 was provided by Mathew himself.

The foundation stone was laid on 10 October 1832, Mathew's birthday. A dispute over costs led to Mathew paying Pain a further £300. Pain died in 1838, and supervision of the construction was taken over by Thomas Coakley. The cost of the church had spiralled to £14,000 by 1840. With the builder, a Mr Anthony, unable to meet his costs, work stalled in 1841. Mathew refused the suggestions of many to use subscriptions from the temperance movement to fund his church.

Following the Great Famine, a public meeting in Cork agreed to continue work on Holy Trinity. Thomas Deane, whose entry in the original competition had failed, was chosen to complete the church without its portico and spire. William Atkins was given responsibility for the church's interior. The church finally opened on 10 October 1850. A Pontifical High Mass was held, with admission by ticket, and celebrated by the bishops of Cork, Cloyne and Ross, and Ossory. Nevertheless, the interior was only completed ten years after Mathew's death, about 1866, and the portico remained unfinished. The sculptor John Hogan produced two carved heads flanking the main door.

=== Completion ===
Several suggestions were made in the following two decades to complete the façade of Holy Trinity. A proposal by George Ashlin was approved in 1877 which would have differed drastically from Pain's original plans, but this was not carried out. Fr. Paul Neary, the Capuchin provincial superior in Ireland, organised celebrations for the centenary of Fr. Mathew's birth, and organised a public meeting to stimulate progress on the church. It was decided to complete the church to Pain's design. A campaign was organised to ensure the funds were in place for work to be completed.

Another competition was held to select a façade, with the prize again £50; among the requirements were that it should be made of limestone, like the existing structure, and cost no more than £6,000. Of the twelve entries, Ashlin, now consultant architect to the Building Committee, described that by Walter G. Doolin as "the one most suitable for a façade to the building;" submissions also came from Thomas Drew and Ashlin's own firm Pugin & Ashlin. The committee, however, selected a design by Dominic (or Dominick) J. Coakley. This design was praised for its closeness to that of Pain but at a smaller scale. The limestone used in the façade came from the same quarry as the earlier work had used, in Little Island, which had deliberately lain unused until work recommenced.

The construction work was taken over by Corkman John Sisk. There was evidently some concern that the church would not be completed for Mathew's centenary, which Denny Lane said would be "a national disgrace." Nevertheless, work on Holy Trinity was completed in time and the church was reopened on 13 October 1890, marked with another ticketed Mass.

=== Interior ===
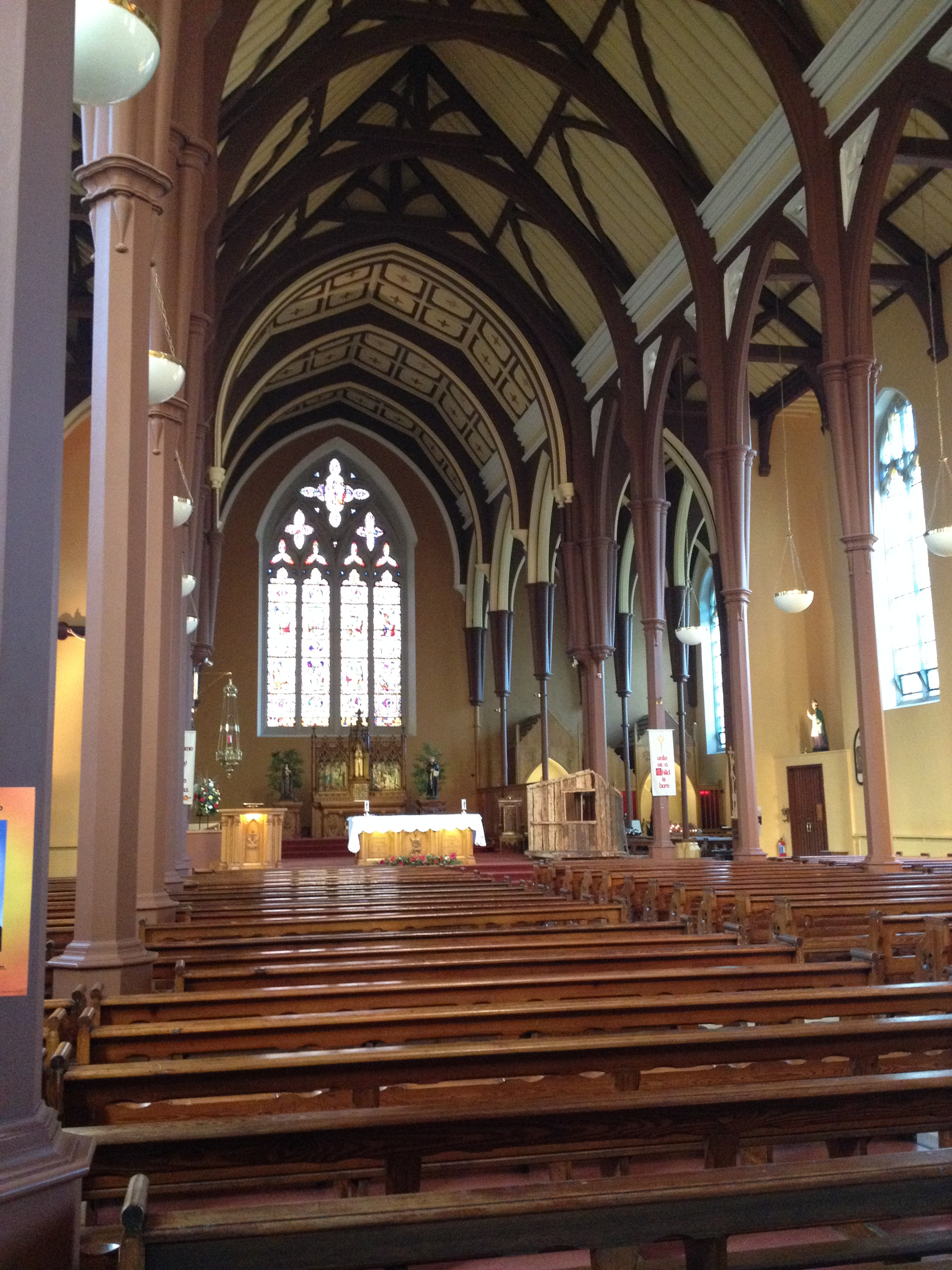
The nave of Holy Trinity

The north window, behind the high altar, is dedicated to Daniel O'Connell and was installed in 1850, three years after his death. Two other stained glass windows, likely by the same artist, depict the Virgin Mary and the coat of arms of Pope Leo XIII.

A stained glass window in the east wall, commissioned by the Cork and District Trades and Labour Council and dedicated to Cork Capuchin brother Thomas Dowling, who had mediated an industrial dispute during World War I, was produced by Joshua Clarke to a design by his son Harry Clarke and under his supervision. Among other figures, it features Christ as Prince of Peace and Saint Francis holding a dove, with the city's skyline at the bottom of the window. Two further windows were commissioned from Harry Clarke and his brother, Walter, depicting the Sacred Heart and the Immaculate Conception being venerated by Munster saints. Installation of these windows was overseen by the architect James Finbarre McMullen (or McMullan) and John Sisk between 1918 and 1929.

The interior was substantially altered in the early 1900s. A memorial chapel was added in 1908, dedicated to Fr. Bernard Jennings (died 1904), a Cork Capuchin social worker, at a cost of £3,500 and designed by Ashlin. This extension had the effect of unbalancing the interior, however, as there was no space for a mirroring chapel on the other side. Further alterations were made to the interior about 1942 by McMullen.

Extensive renovations were carried out in the 1980s at the instigation of church guardian Father Eustace McSweeney, who wished to bring the church's interior in line with the liturgy of the Second Vatican Council. Structural flaws and problems such as dry rot evidently riddled the building, to the extent that some suggested demolishing and rebuilding the church from scratch. At a cost of £500,000, the church was entirely renovated within a year in 1982. This involved, controversially, replacing the casings around the cast-iron columns with more slender wooden casings and removing the original pulpit, high altar and confessionals. The interior porch was extended in 2013 to encompass the area beneath the balcony.

=== Friary ===
Together with the 1771 chapel, a Capuchin friary stood on Blackamoor Lane from the mid-18th century until the 1850s. The congregation moved to George's Quay by 1855 and subsequently moved across the river to a site across the road from the new church.

A plan for a friary which would wrap around the church on three sides was put forward by John Pine Hurley, who "offered his professional services, without remuneration," and the foundation stone was laid during a ceremony on 23 September 1866. However, the building was evidently never completed. The current friary, directly adjacent to the church on the west side and designed by Robert Walker in the Venetian Gothic style, was completed in 1884 (although some sources say 1888). This three-storey structure, built out of limestone and red brick, was built in a matter of weeks and described by the Cork Examiner as "pleasing in the extreme ... the most perfect monastery in Ireland". A statue of Saint Francis was placed over the entrance in 1934.

== Architecture ==
Holy Trinity was designed in a simple English Gothic Revival, or Regency Gothic, architectural style. Pain was a strong proponent of this style over High Victorian Gothic, which was favoured by his rivals, the Deanes, although he also worked in Classical architecture. He made extensive use of arched windows, flying buttresses and columns, culminating in a tapering "lacy Gothic spire, seemingly more air than stone." At the time of its completion, the church was described by the Cork Examiner as "a worthy memorial of its renowned patron ... The whole design is exceedingly graceful." Pain's plan would have brought the church to a height of 182 feet (55 m), but the building as realised only reaches 160 feet (49 m). Cast-iron was used extensively to achieve the spaciousness of the church interior. Curtin-Kelly suggests this was because of the poor, marshy foundations, which would have prohibited heavier, stone columns.

== Social history ==
The Capuchin community in Cork acquired a premises on Queen Street, modern Fr Mathew Street, in 1907. This building, now known as Father Mathew Hall, was used to host theatrical performances, annual pantomimes and other productions from 1911 to the 1960s. It remains the venue for the annual Feis Maitiú begun by Capuchin Fr Micheál O'Shea in 1927. A fenced boundary wall was added to the front of the church about 1960. From 1968, the Capuchin friars organised a "Clothing Guild" to distribute clothes and other items to the poor in Cork, distributing up to 5,000 sacks of clothing annually at its peak. Various other social efforts have been undertaken by the Capuchins in Cork, including the organisation of youth groups, sodalities and prayer groups.

In 2013, the church hosted visiting relics of Franciscan saint Anthony of Padua. In 2015, the Capuchin Order celebrated the four-hundredth anniversary of its arrival in Ireland. Patricia Curtin-Kelly's book An Ornament to the City, a survey of Holy Trinity's history, was published at this time with a foreword by the provincial superior.

== In popular culture ==
The church features in the novel Beyond Absolution by Cora Harrison, and was used as a filming location in an episode of The Young Offenders television series.
