= Cork Courthouse, Washington Street =

Neo-Classical courthouse in Cork, Ireland

- Teach Cúirte Chorcaí, Sráid Washington
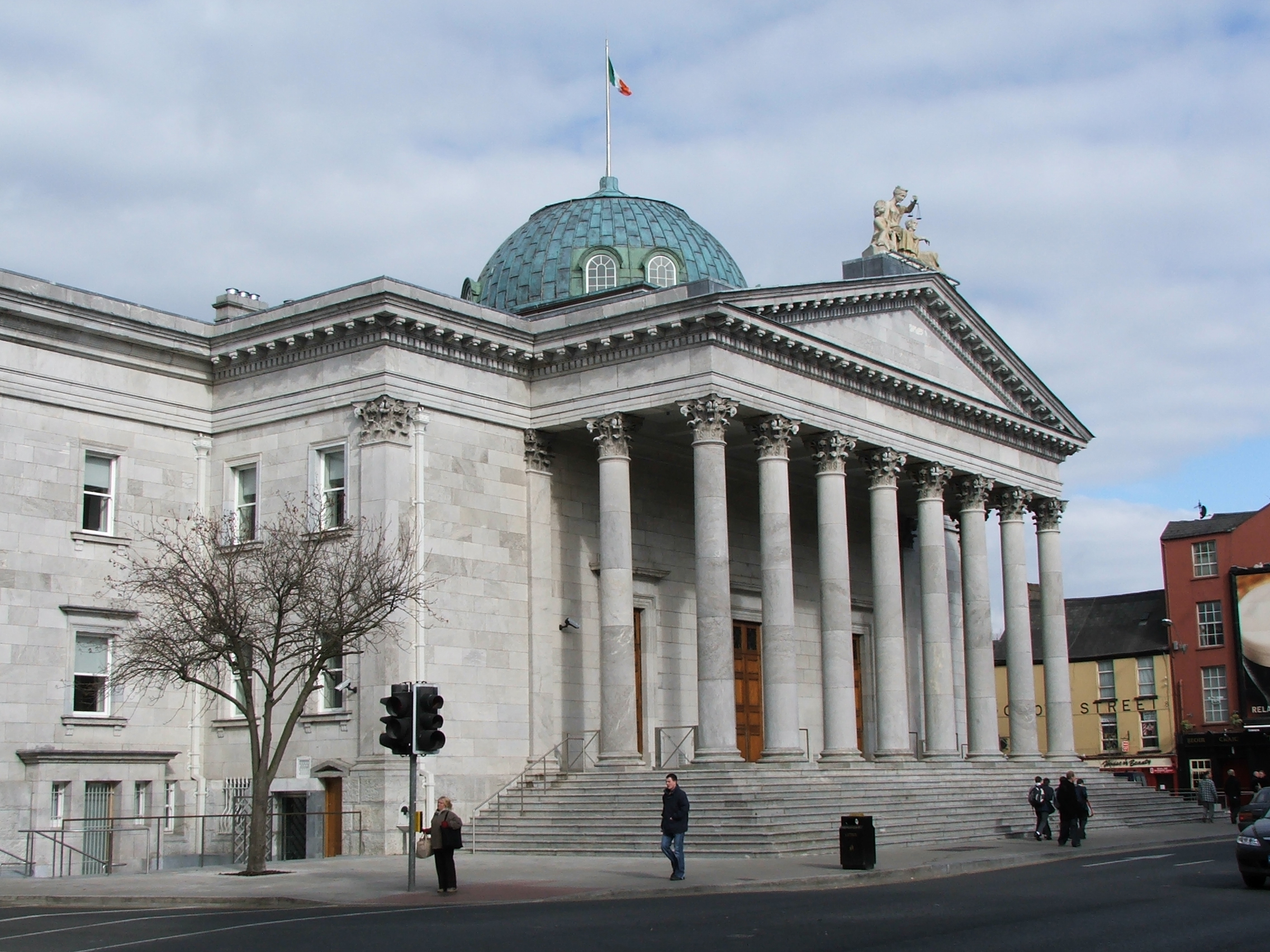
- Cork Courthouse, Washington Street
- Interactive map of the Cork Courthouse, Washington Street area

General information
- Architectural style: Neoclassical style
- Location: Cork, Ireland
- Coordinates: 51.8980°N 8.4788°W
- Completed: 1835; 1895; 2005

Design and construction
- Architects: George Richard Pain and James Pain (original); William Henry Hill (rebuilding)

Cork Courthouse (Irish: Teach Cúirte Chorcaí, Sráid Washington) is a judicial facility in Washington Street, Cork, Ireland. It serves as the Cork Court Office in civil and family related matters, while the courthouse on Anglesea Street handles criminal trials. It operates on the level of both the District and Circuit Courts. The courthouse occupies the entire block between Washington Street, Liberty Street, Cross Street and Courthouse Street.

== History ==
Much of the building's early history has been lost, due to the destruction of records in the great fires of 1891 (the courthouse itself) and 1920 (Cork City Hall). As a result, most surviving primary sources relating to the history of the courthouse tend to have partisan biases.

=== 19th century ===
Prior to 1835, Cork was served by two courthouses: one for the city, and one for the county. Plans were made to build the courthouse because the old county courthouse was damaged by fire. This original courthouse was described as being in a "decayed and perishing condition" in 1827. Plans for the building of a new courthouse in Cork were being made as early as July 1827. It was the last assize courthouse to be planned in Ireland before Catholic emancipation was granted in 1829. In 1829, the Cork Corporation decided to merge the City and County courthouses, and have them both be serviced by a new development.

A competition for design was held in 1830, which brothers James and George Richard Pain won — premiums of IR£40, £20, and £10 were offered. They were awarded a £16,000 contract. At the time of going to competition, no particular site had been chosen for the courthouse, but the three principal contenders were Nelson Place (now Emmet Place), St. Patrick's Street, and Great George's Street (now Washington street). By late 1829, it was confirmed that the courthouse would be built on Great George's Street. Construction began in 1831, and was completed between 1835 and 1836 at a cost of £22,000 (equal to roughly €3.4 million in 2021). It is thought that James and Thomas Fitzgerald executed the stonework.

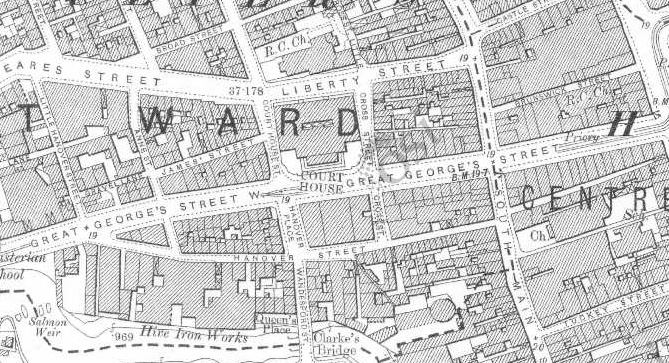
Section of the 1899 Ordnance Survey map of Cork, showing the courthouse on what was then Great George's Street, now Washington Street.

Under pressure from the trades' council, the Corporation had included a stipulation in the contract which guaranteed the use of local work in regards to the plumbing and furnishing of the building. It was later revealed, however, that the plumbing contract had been awarded to a Scottish firm, and that many of the establishments providing furniture had evaded the local manufacture clause. While local plumbers failed to find redress, cabinet makers successfully picketed the courthouse and secured the removal of all imported furniture from the building, all of which were substituted with locally crafted items. The limestone used for the portico was cut from stone sourced from Carrigacrump, Cork, while the rest of the limestone was principally sourced from Beaumont and Gillabbey.

The first sitting in this new courthouse was held on 12 March 1836. At this first sitting, the Hon. Justice Philip Crampton described the courthouse as a "temple suitable to the solemn administration of justice". However, he also complained about the interior design of the building, saying that he had exhausted himself addressing the Grand Jury, due to the distance between them. After it was mostly destroyed by fire in 1891, a town clerk described the courthouse as having been one of the worst of its kind in Ireland, citing in particular the quality of the accommodation and the draughtiness of the building. It was noted by the clerk that some judges preferred to make use of Model Schools, such as the one the Anglesea Street courthouse now occupies.

After the fire on Good Friday, 27 March 1891, (Note: Sources differ on whether the year was 1890 or 1891. However they do not dispute that it was Good Friday the 27 of March. Therefore it must have been 1891, as that was the date of Good Friday that year, while in 1890 it fell on 4 April.) the building was "almost a complete write-off". In the immediate aftermath of the fire, it was suspected that it had been a deliberate act of arson committed by Irish nationalists, though it eventually transpired to have been an accidental fire, which started when the flue of the hot water furnace ignited. Many important historical documents relating to the city of Cork were lost in the blaze. Unlike the rest of the building, the original portico survived the fire. William Henry Hill won the competition for permission to rebuild the courthouse in 1891, with works being completed in 1895. Samuel Hill (no relation) served as the contractor for the reconstruction. While the façade and portico of the exterior were retained, the interior was completely re-modelled. The copper dome on the top of the courthouse was added at this point. The eventual cost of rebuilding was £27,000.

=== 20th century ===
Following the implementation of the Local Government (Ireland) Act 1898, which established county councils in every county, the rear of the upper floor of the building, previously used exclusively as a courthouse, also became the meeting place for Cork County Council.

On 23 June 1917, 2,000 out of a crowd of 10,000 people escorted Cork's released Easter Rising prisoners from Glanmire railway station to Cork City. After speeches were given by released prisoners on the Grand Parade, a crowd of roughly 500 people went to the men's prison on the Western Road, and shouted encouragements to the inmates. They then proceeded to the courthouse, and one man climbed a ladder up to the roof of the building. He ran an Irish tricolour up the flagpole, before removing the bronze scales of justice from the statue of Lady Justice that crowns the building's portico. He threw the scales to the street, where they shattered, to the applause of the gathered crowd.

After the county council moved to the County Hall in 1968, the building continued to function as a courthouse. After the Model School on Anglesea Street was converted to a courthouse in 1995, the courthouse on Washington Street began operating only at the level of the Circuit Court. Owing to its poor condition, the courthouse underwent major refurbishment between 1998 and 2005. During this period, a temporary facility was improvised in a refurbished warehouse on Camden Quay, and was rented at a cost of €760,000 per annum. After its closure, the courthouse underwent major refurbishments to save it from dereliction. The plans for the refurbishment were designed by Michael Russel of the Cork City Architect's Department. Construction took place over two phases, dealing with the interior and exterior respectively. The first phase took place in 1998, and involved retouching the stonework, roof, windows, and doors of the courthouse. The courthouse was closed in 1999 due to its poor condition.

=== 21st century ===
The second phase of refurbishments began in 2003, and the interior design of the building was completely overhauled. The interior work was subcontracted to Conservation|Letterfrack. As part of their work, Conservation|Letterfrack restored over 200 pieces of furniture, restored and modified four of the seven courtrooms, restored the baldacchinos in the two primary courthouses, restored the main entrance door, repaired all of the fixed furniture, made the courthouse wheelchair accessible, re-upholstered all of the seating, provided custom made squab cushions, and improved upon existing varnishing of the courthouse interior. As part of these renovations, what had been an open courtyard in the centre of the courthouse was glazed over at roof level, a glass floor was inserted at the level of the first floor, and the ground floor was lowered by two feet, effectively adding an additional floor to the courthouse, as well as providing an atrium for the building. The exterior dome also underwent extensive restoration, including being refenestrated and reclad with copper.

Also as part of these refurbishments, a basement corridor, designed to act as a prisoner tunnel, was excavated. As the building lies within the Zone of Archaeological Potential for Cork City, all excavation had to be monitored. The excavations were considered likely to penetrate medieval and post-medieval stratigraphy, in particular it was expected that part of the city's medieval wall would be encountered during excavation. It was discovered, however, that most of the medieval stratigraphy had been disturbed by the construction of the courthouse foundations in the 19th century, and no trace of the medieval wall was found. The courthouse reopened on 31 January 2005, though the official re-opening took place on 26 February. Michael Lowry, the Minister for Justice, Equality and Law Reform officially reopened the courthouse. In total, €26 million was spent restoring the courthouse. The restorative works carried out on the courthouse were the most extensive in Ireland since the Four Courts was reconstructed following its near destruction during the Irish Civil War.

After the re-opening of the courthouse, it was announced that it would begin hosting sessions of the Central Criminal Court.

Although criminal cases have been heard at the new Anglesea Street courthouse since May 2018, civil cases continue to be heard in Washington Street.

== Architecture ==
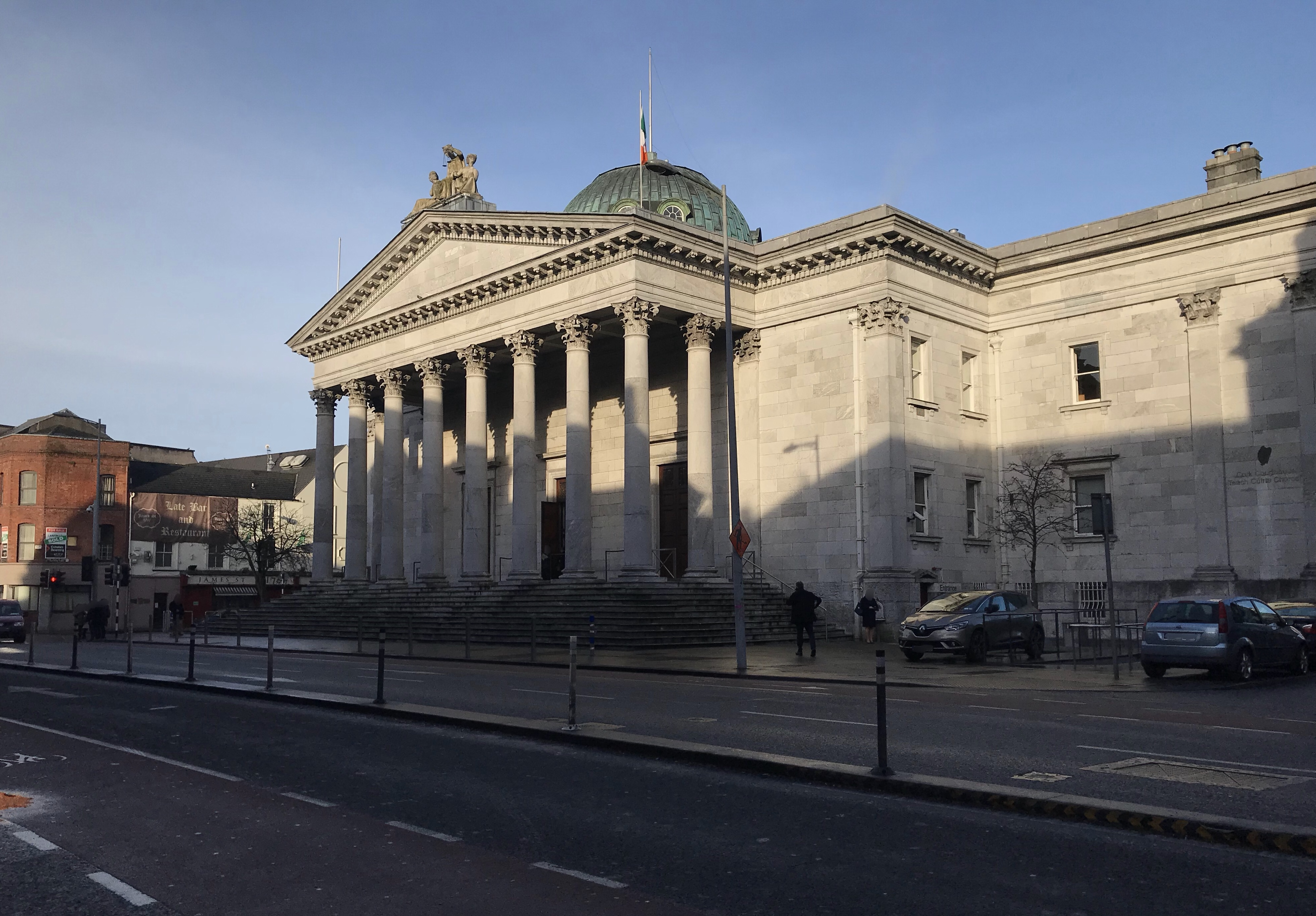
Front façade, looking northwest from Washington Street

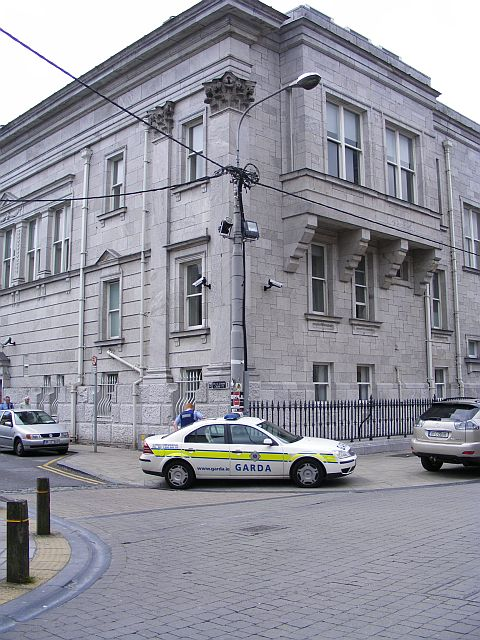
Rear of the courthouse from Liberty Street

The building measures 280 feet in length by 190 feet in depth and is 66 feet tall. It fills a one acre site, and has a basement, ground, and first floor. Railings once separated the courthouse from the street, though these were removed in the early 1960s.

According to Dr. Richard Butler, author of "Building the Irish Courthouse and Prison: A Political History, 1750–1850", the courthouse on Washington Street represents the culmination of an architectural period "marked by [William Vitruvius] Morrison's introduction of a new design in 1826–7, through to Westenra's excitement and anxiety in Monaghan in 1827, and to the design's full realisation at Tralee, Carlow, and finally Cork". It is described by Frank Keohane, author of the Cork City and County edition of the Pevsner Architectural Guides, as "the tour de force of Cork's Late Georgian golden age."

=== Exterior ===
The exterior of the building was largely designed in the neoclassical style, and is built in ashlar limestone. There is a flight of steps on three sides leading up to a full Corinthian order octastyle portico, with two intercolumniations at each return. The only other example of an octastyle portico in Ireland is at Carlow Courthouse, which was designed by Morrison. There is a front range of columns which projects twenty feet from the building, and which support an entablature and a modillioned pediment. The building is circumscribed by a deep cornice. The columns themselves, being unfluted, are not of Corinthian order, but are more similar to Tuscan order columns. The columns are 30 feet high, and are built on a platform six feet above the level of the street. The platform is approached by a flight of eleven steps. Corinthian pilasters divide the recessed bays flanking the portico, as well at both the east and west side of the building, where the first two bays at either end are three storey. The north façade breaks from the Corinthian style of the rest of the exterior, and is of no particular style.

There is a group of sculptures by Thomas Kirk on top of the pediment, consisting of female representations of either Hibernia flanked by Justice and Commerce, or of Justice flanked by Law and Mercy. The pediment itself is inscribed with the words "WILLIAM IV KING". Behind the portico, there is a copper-coated dome which is set with windows. Subsidiary double-pitched slate roofs are set between the main blocks.

=== Interior ===
After the fire in 1891, the interior was remodelled in an Early Renaissance style.

The arcaded, three-storey foyer is crowned by the dome. It features both marble pilasters and marble piers at both the ground and first floor. On each floor stand pilasters of a different order: Doric on the ground floor, Corinthian on the first floor, and Ionic on the second floor. The main staircase is located in the inner hall, and gives access to the first floor.

On the first floor are the two main courtrooms, originally hosting the City Court in the east wing and the County Court in the west wing. Both courtrooms are double height. These rooms retain some of the features of their 1890s construction, including wooden architraves and mouldings, along with cast-iron Ionic columns. Both have timber panelling to door height on three sides. The original timber, leather-upholstered seating has been kept, along with timber panelled doors, moulding, and architrave. Some of these have timber pediments.
