= Mitchelstown Castle =

Historic site in County Cork, Ireland

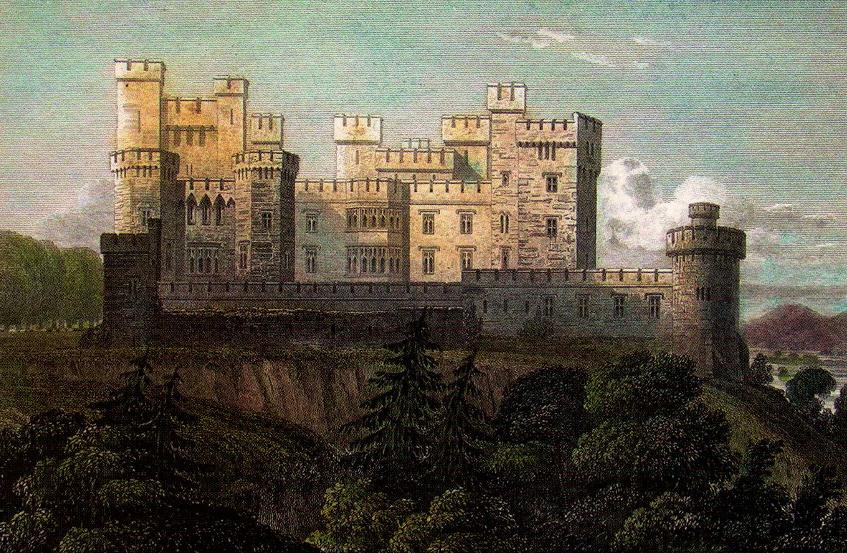
- 19th-century painting of the former castle

- Location within Ireland
- 52°16′20″N 08°16′48″W
- Location: Mitchelstown, County Cork, Ireland.

History
- Built: 19th century
- Built for: 3rd Earl of Kingston
- Demolished: 1920's

Site notes
- Architect(s): James and George Pain.

Mitchelstown Castle, the former home of the Anglo Irish Earls of Kingston, was located in the north County Cork town of Mitchelstown in Ireland.

== History ==
=== 15th to 18th century ===
White Knights, Dark Earls is to date the most extensive published account of Mitchelstown Castle, which was the biggest neo-Gothic house in Ireland. A castle was first built at Mitchelstown in the 15th century by the White Knights of Mitchelstown, from whom, through marriage, it passed to the King family, Barons and Earls of Kingston. James, 4th Baron Kingston, extensively refurbished and modernised the castle in the 1730s. After his death in 1761, the castle passed to his granddaughter, Caroline Fitzgerald. She married her cousin Robert King, Viscount Kingsborough, who was, from 1797, the 2nd Earl of Kingston. The Kingsboroughs demolished most of the old Mitchelstown Castle in the 1770s and incorporated what remained into a new Palladian mansion, described as a 'house with wings'.They employed the young Mary Wollstonecraft as governess to their three children

=== 19th century ===
In 1823, after his succession, their son, George, 3rd Earl of Kingston, demolished the Palladian house and replaced it with a new castle designed by James and George Richard Pain. It had 60 principal and 20 minor bedrooms, a 100-foot-long (30 m) gallery, three libraries, morning room, dining room (which could seat 100 guests at one sitting) and various other facilities.

Mitchelstown Castle was the biggest neo-Gothic house in Ireland, cost £100,000 to build and became the 'fashion statement' of its time. It inspired other major Irish castles, such as Strancally Castle (County Waterford) and Dromoland Castle for Lord Inchiquin.

The 100,000-acre Mitchelstown estate ran into considerable financial difficulties, which, after the Great Famine of 1845–51, forced its owners to sell 70,000 acres (280 km^{2}) in the Landed Estates Court. Further difficulties arose as a result of internal family squabbling, legal disputes and the Land War of the 1880s, in which the estate played a prominent part.

=== 20th century ===
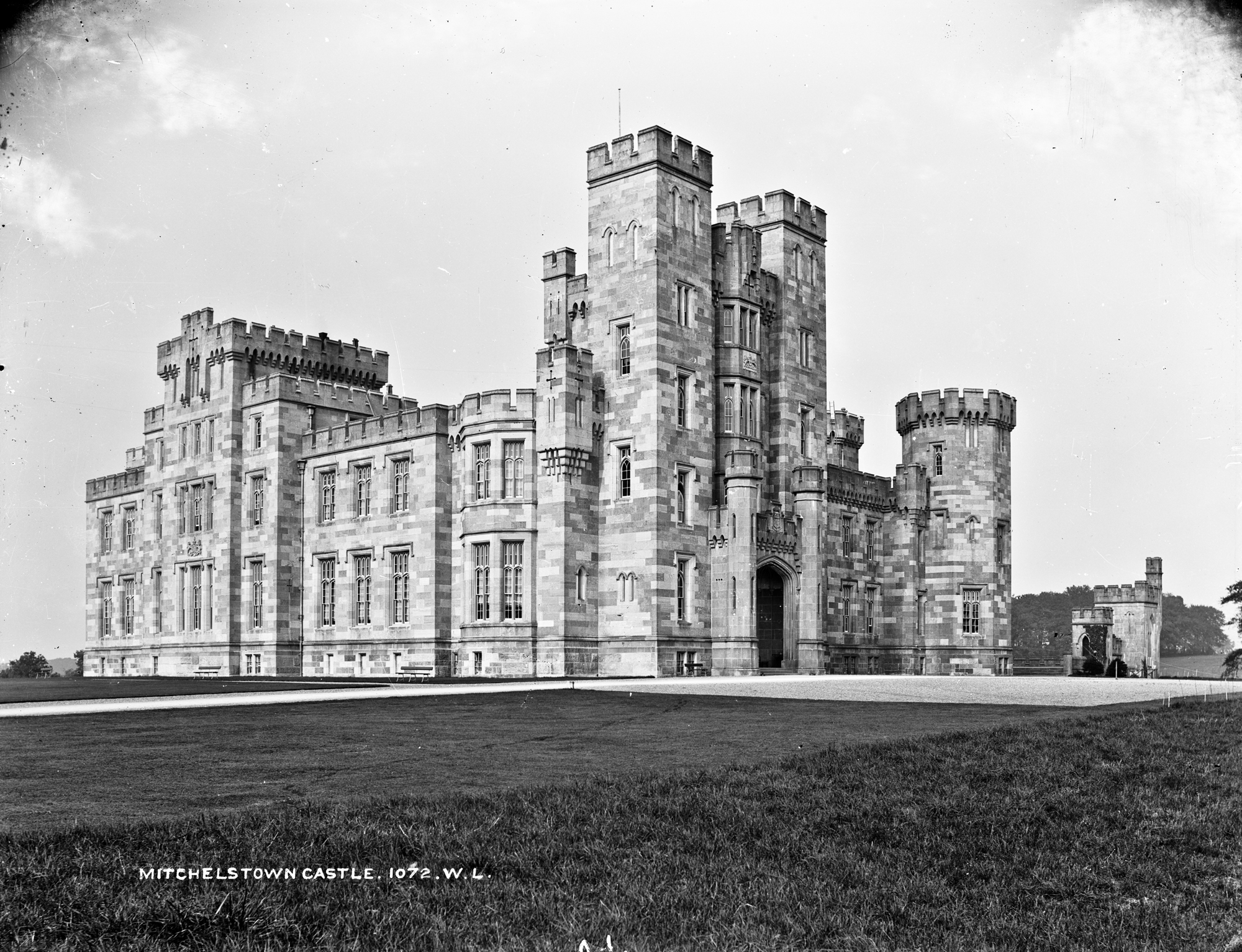
Mitchelstown Castle, bef. 1914

In June 1922, the castle was forcibly occupied by the Irish Republican Army. Then owner, William Downes Webber (second husband of Anna, Dowager Countess of Kingston), his relatives and servants were 'evicted' to houses in nearby King Square. Over the next few weeks the castle was held by republicans, who appeared to be preparing it for some kind of siege. However, in early August, the contents of the building were stolen by some republicans, including paintings by Thomas Gainsborough and William Beechey, as well as silver, furniture, wall hangings, and mantlepieces.

On 12 August 1922, Mitchelstown Castle was burned on the orders of a local republican leader, P. J. Luddy, whose father and grandfather had been middlemen on the Kingston estate. At the same time, the military barracks at Fermoy, Mallow, Mitchelstown and Kilworth were burned, as well as the military hospital in Fermoy, Mitchelstown workhouse, Mitchelstown RIC barracks and the railway viaduct in Mallow.

Afterwards, William Downes Webber sought compensation from the Irish Free State totalling £149,000 for rebuilding and £18,000 for contents. He intended to rebuild if sufficient compensation was provided. After his death in 1924, Colonel W.A. King-Harman pursued the claim in the Irish courts. Judge Kenny, in the Irish High Court in 1926, stated that the destruction of Mitchelstown Castle had been an act of wanton destruction which had no military purpose. He awarded £27,500 for the building and the entire £18,000 requested for the contents. Most of this was used to build replacement properties in Dublin as King-Harman decided that the award was too small a sum to rebuild the castle.

The stones of Mitchelstown Castle were subsequently sold to the Cistercian monks of Mount Melleray Abbey, County Waterford, who used them to build a new abbey.

In the 1940s, Mitchelstown Co-operative Agricultural Society built a milk processing factory on the site of the castle, which it had purchased together with some of the demesne lands that surrounded it. The site is now owned by Dairygold Co-op.

== People ==
The proto-feminist Mary Wollstonecraft was governess there to the children of the household, including Margaret King, later Countess Mount Cashell, to whom Percy Bysshe Shelley dedicated his poem, A Sensitive Plant. Other notable members of the King family included Viscount Kingsborough, author of Antiquities of Mexico.

Notable guests at Mitchelstown Castle included George Bernard Shaw, Arthur Young, Elizabeth Bowen and Prince Hermann von Pückler-Muskau.

== Sources ==
- Bill Power. White Knights, Dark Earls: The Rise and Fall of an Anglo-Irish Dynasty. pub. Collins (2000)
- Bill Power, 'Another Side of Mitchelstown', Mitchelstown 2008.
- Bill Power, 'Images of Mitchelstown, stories and pictures from my own place,' pub. Mount Cashell Press, 2002.
- Anthony Lawrence King-Harman. The Kings of King House
- Janet Todd, The Rebellious Kingsborough Sisters and the Making of a Modern Nation Ballantine (2005).
- Claire Tomalin. The Life and Death of Mary Wollstonecraft. (1992). This biography of Wollstonecraft, a former governess to the King family in the late 1780s, provides some general information about the house, mainly in footnotes.
