= Cork Courthouse, Anglesea Street =

Schoolhouse converted to court facility

Cork Courthouse
- Teach Cúirte Chorcaí, Sráid Anglesea
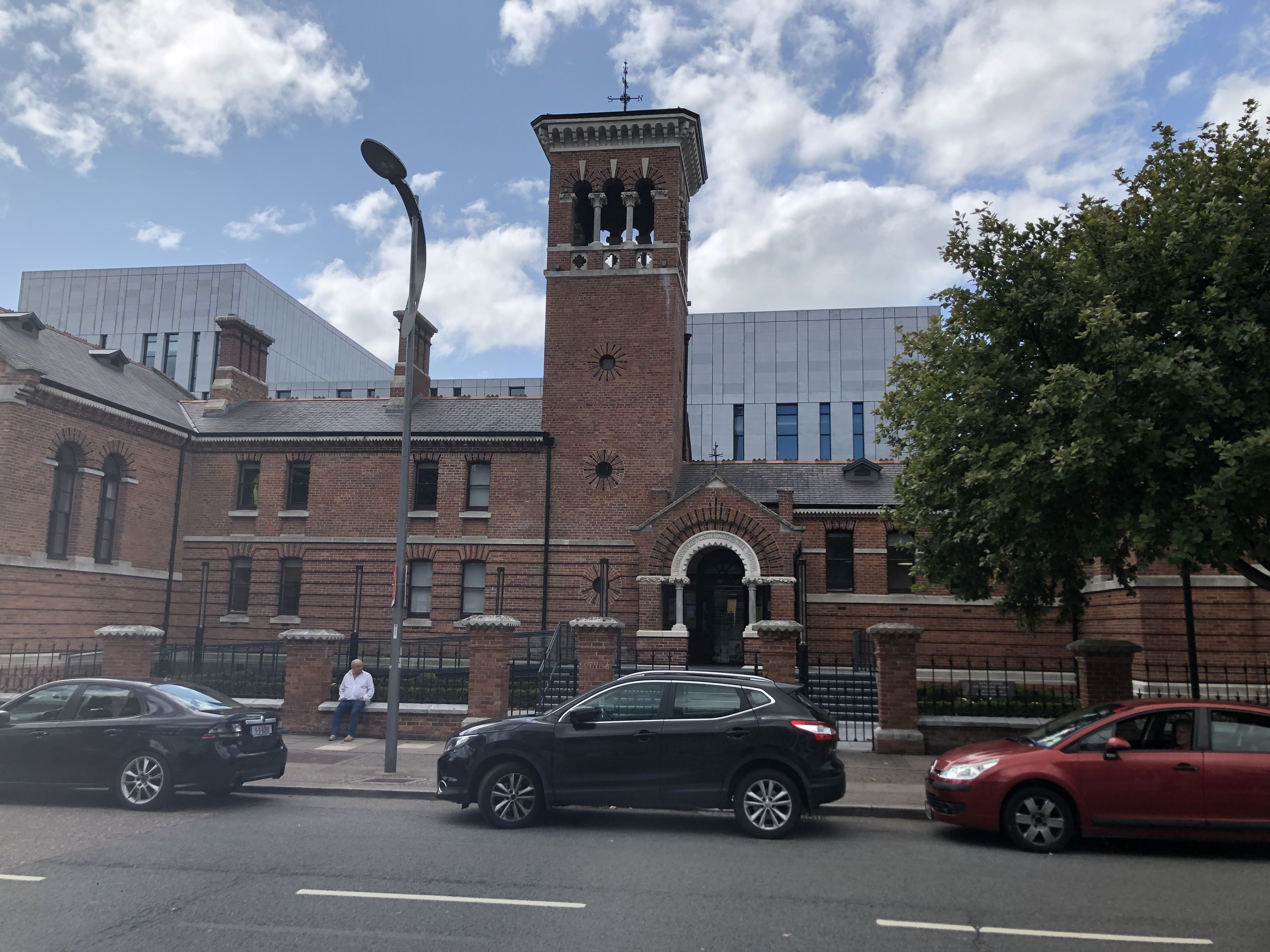
- Front-view of the building. What was the model school in redbrick, the grey behind is the new development.
- Interactive map of the Cork Courthouse area

General information
- Architectural style: Gothic Revival style
- Location: Cork, Ireland
- Coordinates: 51.8962°N 8.4663°W
- Construction started: 1862
- Completed: 1865

Design and construction
- Architects: James H. Owen, Enoch T. Owen and Robert A. Gibbons

Cork Courthouse, Anglesea Street (Irish: Teach Cúirte Chorcaí, Sráid Anglesea) is a judicial facility on Anglesea Street, Cork, Ireland. It serves as the Cork Court Office for matters of crime, while the courthouse on Washington Street serves as the court office for civil and family matters. The Anglesea Street courthouse operates at the level of the District and Circuit Courts, and holds six courtrooms.

Originally a school, the building was converted into a courthouse in 1995. It closed again in 2015 for renovations, with the building's conversion into a courthouse being completed in 2018. The courthouse was opened in May 2018 by Minister for Justice and Equality Charles Flanagan.

Following a 2021 vote by Cork City Council, Anglesea Street is due to be renamed MacSwiney Street, in honour of the family of Terence MacSwiney, though as of late August 2024 the name had not been changed.

== History ==
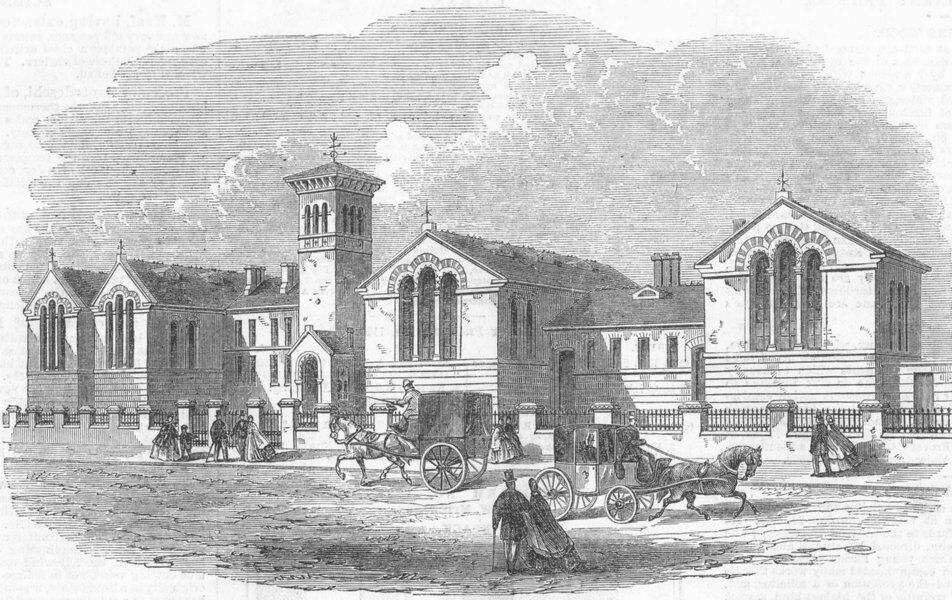
Old print of the building in 1865

=== Model School ===
The building that currently serves as a courthouse was originally a school building, which began construction in 1862 and began operation on 11 September 1865. Known as the "Cork District Model National School", the design of the building is attributed to Board of Works architects James H. Owen, and Enoch T. Owen, with assistance from draughtsman Robert A. Gibbons. The school was divided into male, female, and infant designations, along with hosting a maritime college for part of the early 20th century. Two past pupils of the school went on to become Lord Mayor of Cork: Gerald Goldberg, who became the first Jewish Lord Mayor in 1977, and Peter Barry, who would later serve as Tánaiste.

By 1974, the Model School was in poor condition, with the plaster peeling off the walls, the desks in poor condition, and the windows not protecting pupils from the elements. Despite this, parents were reluctant to allow the school to be closed down, as it was then the only Gaelscoil in the city. The building has been designated as a protected structure by Cork City Council.

=== Courthouse ===
In 1990 the school was closed down and in 1995 it was reopened as a courthouse. From 1995 until 2015, it functioned as host of the District Court of Cork City. In 2015 it was deemed to no longer be fit for purpose, and it was shut down for renovations, which began in July of that same year. It was originally due to reopen in December 2017, but this reopening was delayed due to a shortage of skilled trades people. It reopened in April 2018, when it commenced current operations, functioning at both the District and Circuit level for criminal cases. The total cost of the renovations was €34.8 million, and added a new structure to the complex, one which is over five times bigger than the original building. After the renovations, which followed extensive renovations of the Washington Street courthouse that were completed in 2005, Chief Justice Frank Clarke said that "Cork City now has what are probably the best court facilities in the country."

In March 2020, as a result of the COVID-19 pandemic, Tralee Courthouse ceased hearing jury cases. Since that time, criminal and family proceedings at the circuit court level typically heard in the courthouse have been held both in Limerick Courthouse and at Anglesea Street.

== Architecture ==
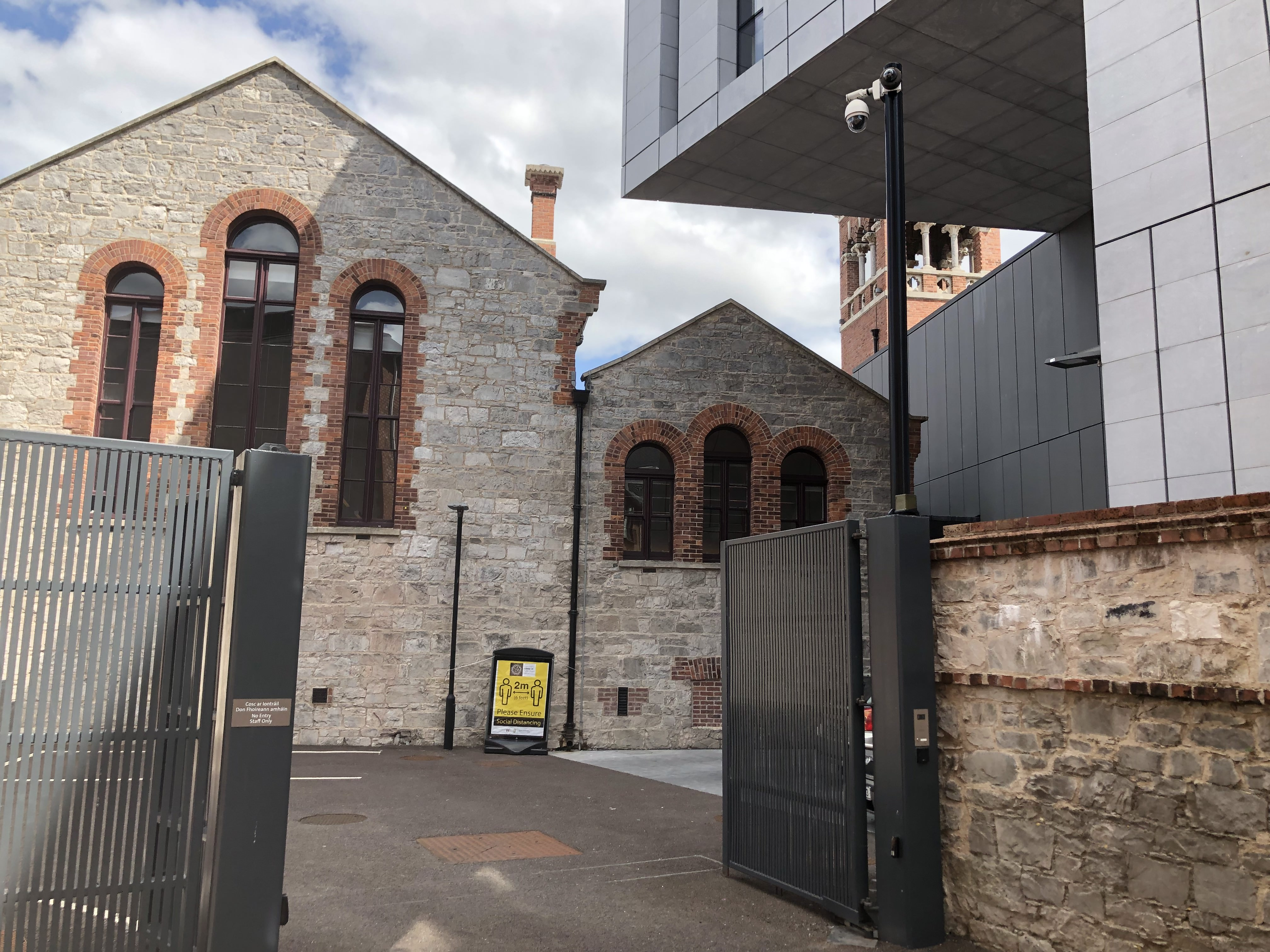
The rear of the courthouse, as seen from Union Quay Lane.

While the original building which hosted the Model School sat on a 1,500 m^{2} site, after the 2015-18 renovations to the courthouse, the site now measures 8,500 m^{2}.

=== Original building ===
The building's original elevation is Italianate-inspired. The entrance porch features a Serlian style opening and capitals into which foxes, rabbits, and monkeys are carved. It was the first major public building in Cork adjudged to be built with "brick comparable to the best English types". As evidenced by surviving contemporary drawings, the plans drawn up by Owens are an example of total design. Areas of the school building are made from Cork limestone. It has pitched roofs, with contrasting red clay ridge tiles. Sawtooth limestone eaves course on brick brackets, and finials top the roof's gables. The roof has gabled timber vents, and decorative brick chimney stacks with sawtooth detail to limestone capping. While the front façade is in redbrick, the rear of the building is in silver limestone with brick dressings. The masonry style of the front façade is English Garden wall bond. It features a rusticated base in brick, with honey-coloured limestone dressings. As part of the 2015-2018 renovations, 25,000 bricks which were inappropriately added to the building in the 1990s were replaced by hand in order to preserve the English garden bond style.

=== New development ===
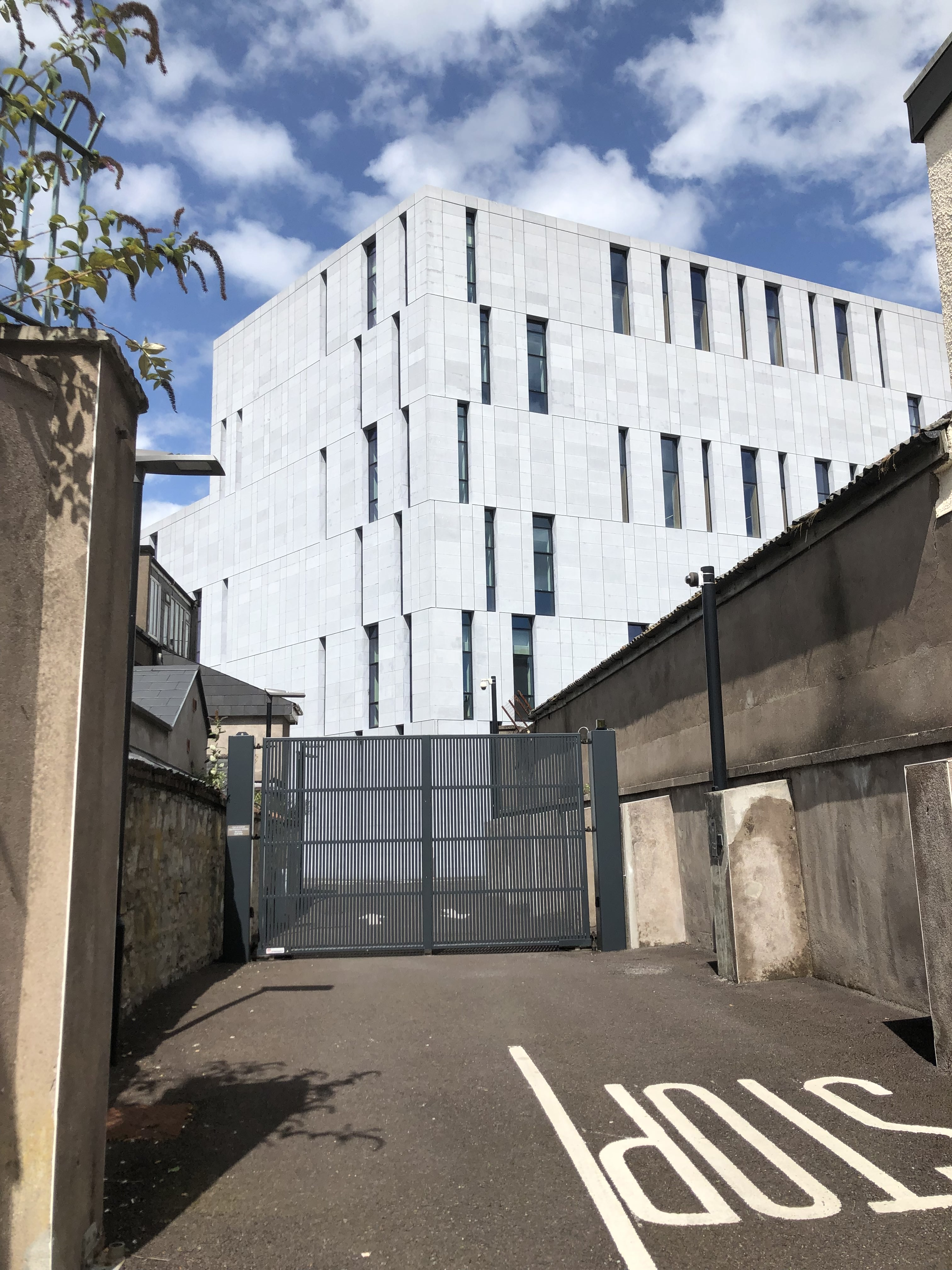
The courthouse, as seen from Copley Street

The building incorporates a large new development to the rear of the original building, accessed through the original campanile entrance. This new building was designed by Wilson Architecture, and is six storeys tall. It hosts all of the courtrooms, whereas the old school building hosts support facilities. When building the new section of the courthouse, it was desired that Cork limestone be used to create a visual connection between the two portions of the courthouse. Unfortunately, the quarrying of Cork limestone had ceased by this juncture, and matching limestone from County Roscommon was utilised instead. During the construction of the new structure, care was taken not to impact the existing walls of the Model School as far as was possible. The structure is described by Shane Kerrish, of Wilson Architecture, as a "zinc-clad, lightweight" structure.

Of the design, Kerrish further states that "The lightness of the structure is to serve as direct contrast with the solidity of the Model School and the new stone mass of the new facility behind, allowing old and new come together, in a manner that respects both designs".
