= Blackrock Castle =

Castellated fortification in Cork, Ireland

- Caisleán na Carraige Duibhe
- Cork, Ireland
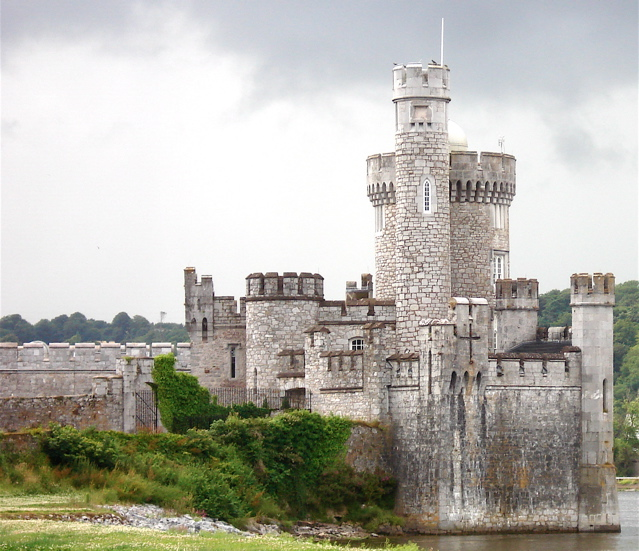

Site information
- Type: Castellated fortification
- Owner: Cork City Council
- Open to the public: Yes

Location
- Coordinates: 51°54′00″N 8°24′09″W
- Height: 5 stories, >100 feet (30 m)

Site history
- Built: 1582 - original fort; 1604 - redeveloped as castle; 1722 - tower rebuilt after fire; 1829 - larger rebuild after fire; 2002 - observatory added
- In use: As visitor centre and observatory
- Materials: Limestone, ashlar masonry

Blackrock Castle is a castellated fortification located at Blackrock, about 2 km from Cork city centre on the banks of the River Lee in Ireland. Originally developed as a coastal defence fortification in the 16th century to protect upper Cork Harbour and port, the site now houses an observatory, visitor centre and restaurant.

== History ==
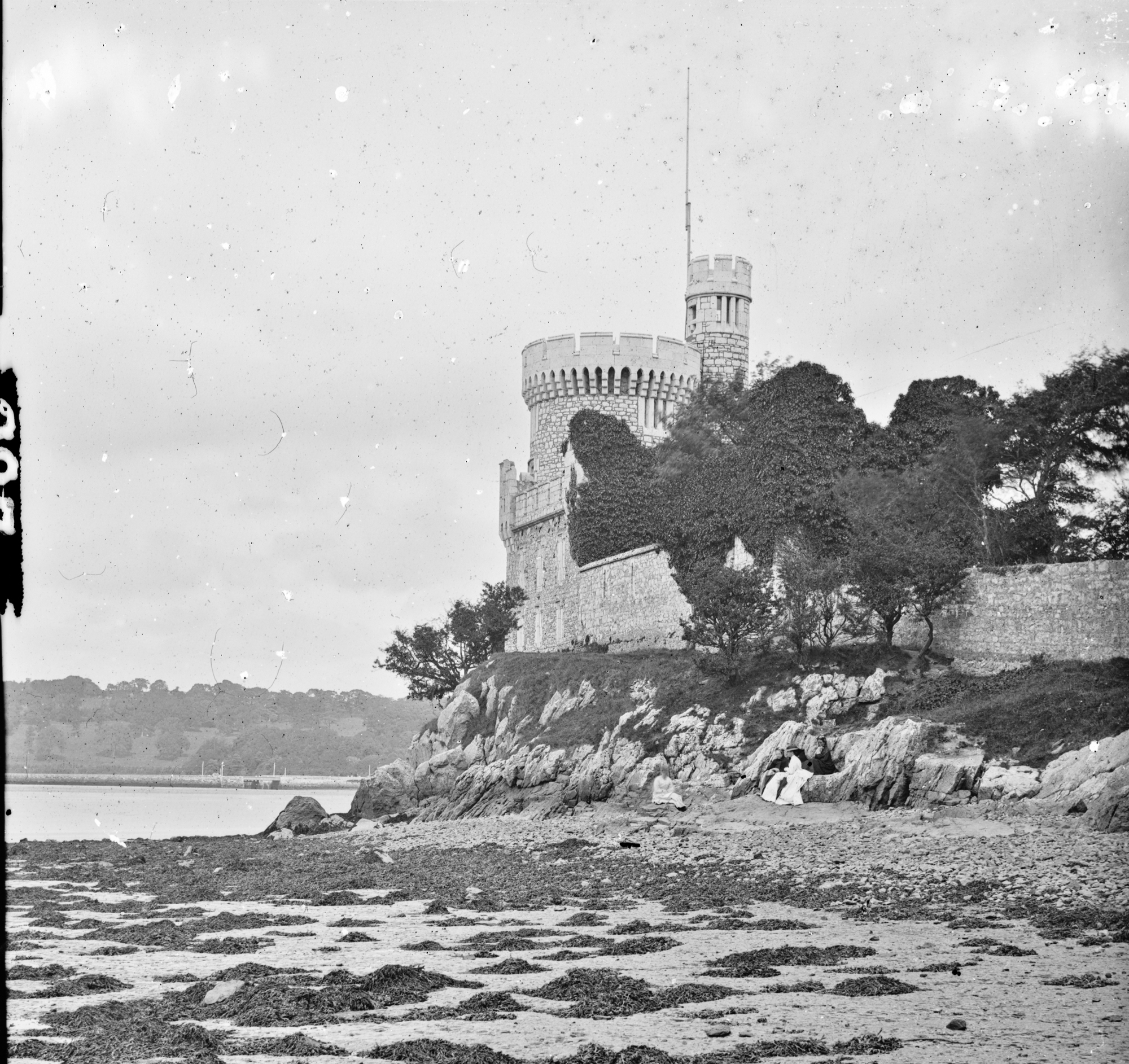
Blackrock Castle in the late 19th century

In the late 16th century, the citizens of Cork appealed to Queen Elizabeth I to construct a fort at Blackrock to "repel pirates and other invaders". In 1582 a fortification was built on the site, and later around 1600, a round tower was constructed to safeguard against pirates "carrying away" vessels entering the harbour. The earliest elements of this structure remaining today are a circular tower on the water's edge, 10.5m in diameter, with walls 2.2m thick.

Blackrock Castle was in the ownership of the City of Cork following a charter of James I to the city in 1608. The castle is later referred to in the Council Book of Cork in 1613 and 1614. In 1722 the old four-storey tower was destroyed by fire and new one built by the citizens, costing £296.

Throughout this period, the castle was used by Cork Corporation for banquets and "convivial gatherings" - some associated with the custom of "throwing the dart". This custom, dating to at least the 18th century, was held every three years in August, and involved a dart (an arrow about four feet long) being thrown by the Mayor from a boat, to indicate the Corporation's jurisdiction over the harbour.

Following a banquet, the castle was destroyed by fire in 1827. The rebuilding began at the direction of Mayor Thomas Dunscombe in 1828 and was completed in March 1829. The architects added three additional storeys to the original tower and rebuilt the out-buildings. The new building cost the City of Cork £1,000. The architects were George Richard Pain and James Pain, who were responsible for other public buildings around Cork at the time. The neo-gothic complex of buildings around a courtyard is essentially what remains today.

Burgee of Blackrock Sailing Club (est. 2017), featuring a silhouette of the castle

The castle entered private hands and for a time in the 20th century was used as a private residence, offices, rowing club headquarters, and restaurant. The building was reacquired by Cork Corporation in 2001, and work commenced on renovating and re-purposing the complex as an observatory and museum.

== Observatory ==
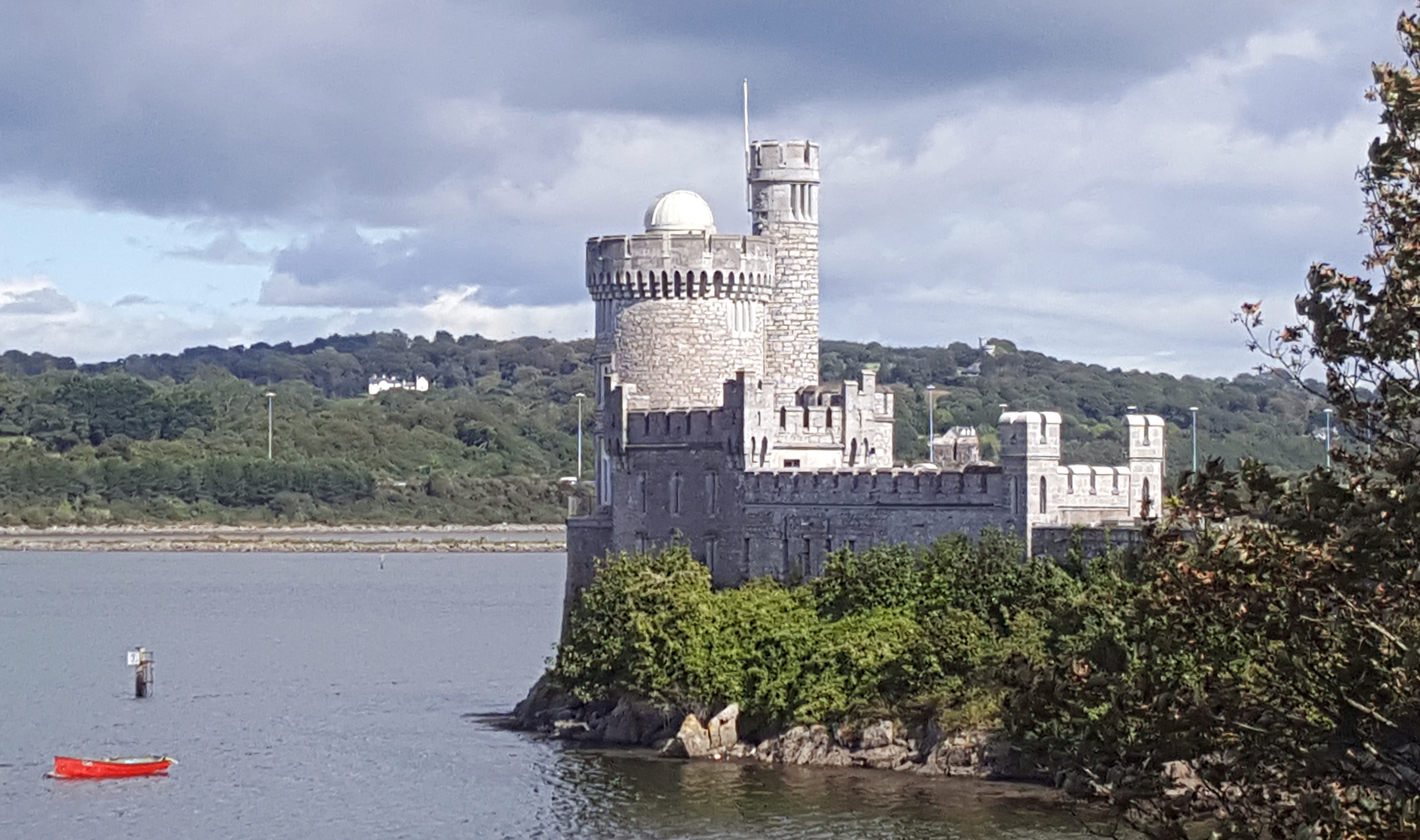
Blackrock Castle Cork looking North

In the early-2000s, Blackrock Castle was redeveloped under a joint venture between Cork City Council, Cork Institute of Technology and a private benefactor.

Opened in 2007, the "Cosmos at the Castle" project was intended to create a "centre for scientific research, outreach and communication". The castle's observatory houses an interactive astronomy center which is open to the public, and past exhibits included a "tour of the universe" and a radio telescope that beamed messages composed by school groups towards nearby stars.

The castle also houses labs staffed by astronomical researchers from Cork Institute of Technology.

== See also ==
- List of astronomical observatories
