= George Richard Pain =

English architect (1793–1838)

- Born: 1793; London
- Died: 26 December 1838 (aged 44–45)
- Occupation: Architect
- Relatives: James Pain (brother)

George Richard Pain (1793 – 26 December 1838) was an English architect active in Ireland during the early 19th century. Born into a family of architects, he trained under his father James Pain and later collaborated extensively with his brother James Pain, with whom he established a practice in Limerick. Together they designed numerous churches, public buildings, and estate structures, becoming influential figures in the development of Gothic Revival architecture in Munster.

== Life ==
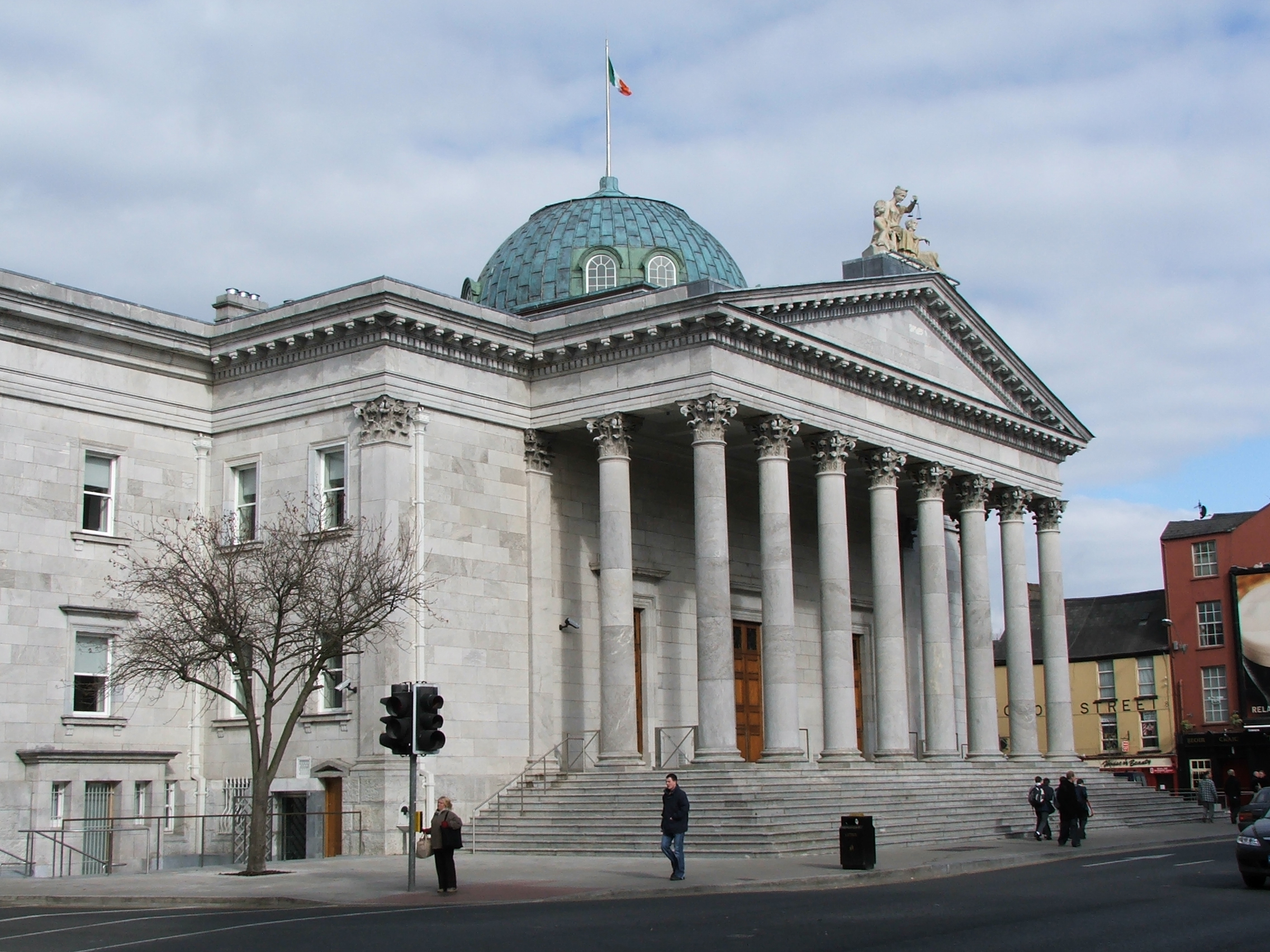
Cork Courthouse, Washington Street, Cork (1830–1835)

George Richard Pain was born in London around 1793. His grandfather was the architect William Pain; his father was James Pain, and he also had a brother named James. No records of his mother have been identified.

Pain exhibited architectural designs at the Royal Academy, and in 1813 won the gold medal of the Royal Society of Arts, followed by the silver medal in 1814. He served an apprenticeship under John Nash in London, alongside his brother. Pain arrived in Ireland circa 1816, about five years after his brother, having overseen the construction of Lough Cutra Castle, County Galway, for Nash. The brothers were commissioned by the Board of First Fruits to design churches and glebe houses, and because of their close partnership, it is often difficult to attribute individual works to either architect.

After settling first in Limerick and then in Cork around 1819, Pain remained in Ireland for the rest of his life. He exhibited two paintings with the Royal Hibernian Academy from Camden Place, Cork, in 1832.

Pain married Catherine Benn on 21 January 1818 at St Mary's Cathedral, Limerick. They had two children: Richard (born circa 1823) and Sally, who later married Henry Vereker of Limerick. Pain married again on 18 September 1824, to Margaret Atkins, at St John's Church, Limerick. He died on 26 December 1838, aged 45, and was buried in the cemetery of St Mary's Church, Shandon.

== Buildings ==
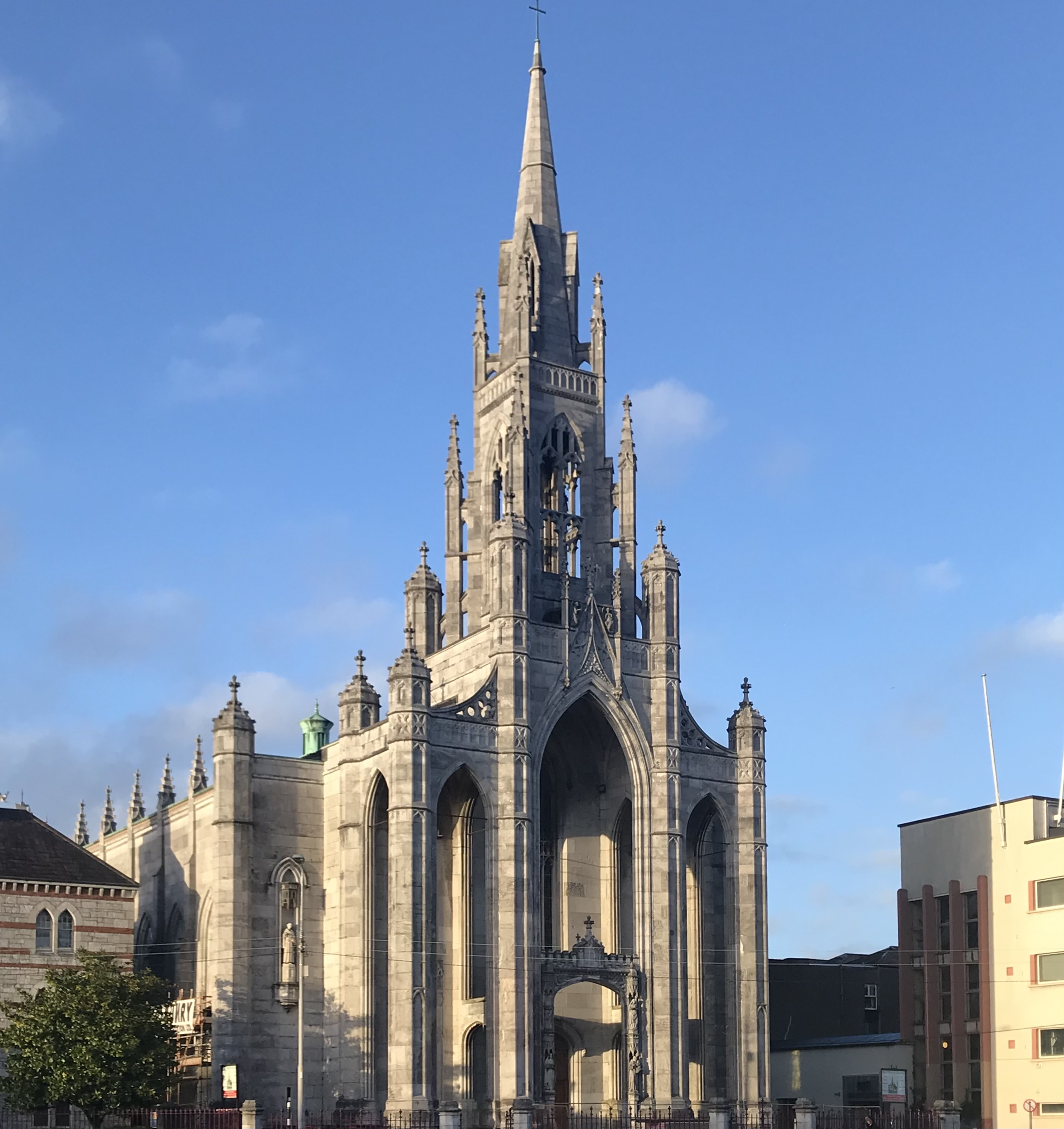
Holy Trinity Church, Fr Mathew Quay, Cork (1825–1850)

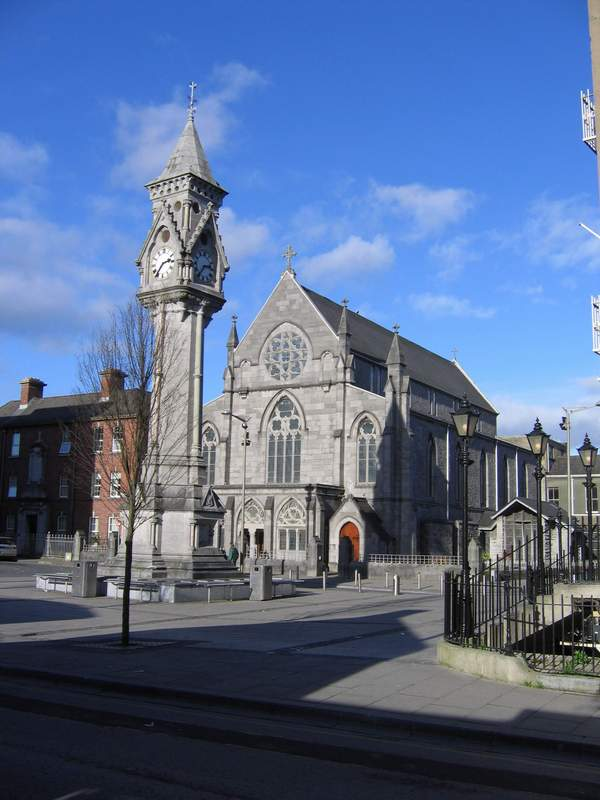
St Saviour's Dominican Church in Limerick, designed and built in 1815

Authorities note the difficulty in authoritatively attributing work to, and between, the Pain brothers due to the nature of their partnership and their prolific output across the south and west of Ireland.

- O'Neil Crowley Bridge (formerly Brunswick Bridge), Cork
- Cork County Gaol, Gaol Walk, Cork (1818)
- Christ Church, South Main Street, Cork (1820s - redesign of exterior and interior)
- Blackrock Castle, Co. Cork (1829)
- County Club (1829–1831), South Mall, Cork
- Cork Courthouse, Washington St, Cork (1830–1835)
- Holy Trinity Church, Fr Mathew Quay, Cork (1825–1850)
- St Patrick's Church, Lower Glanmire Rd, Cork
- Strancally Castle County Waterford
- St James' Church, Mallow, County Cork
- Dromoland Castle, County Clare
