= Washington Street, Cork =

Street in central Cork, Ireland

Washington Street
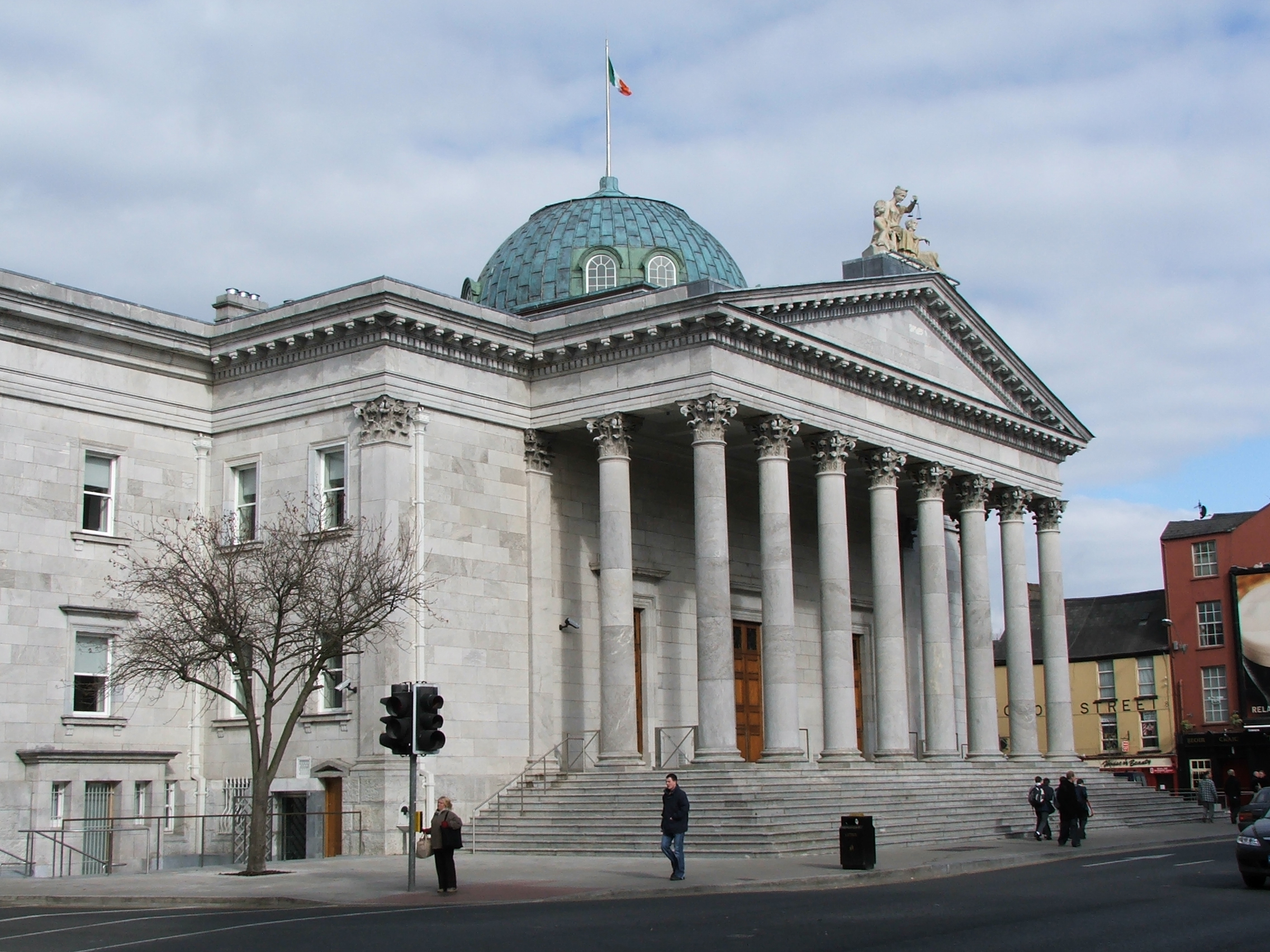
- The courthouse on Washington Street

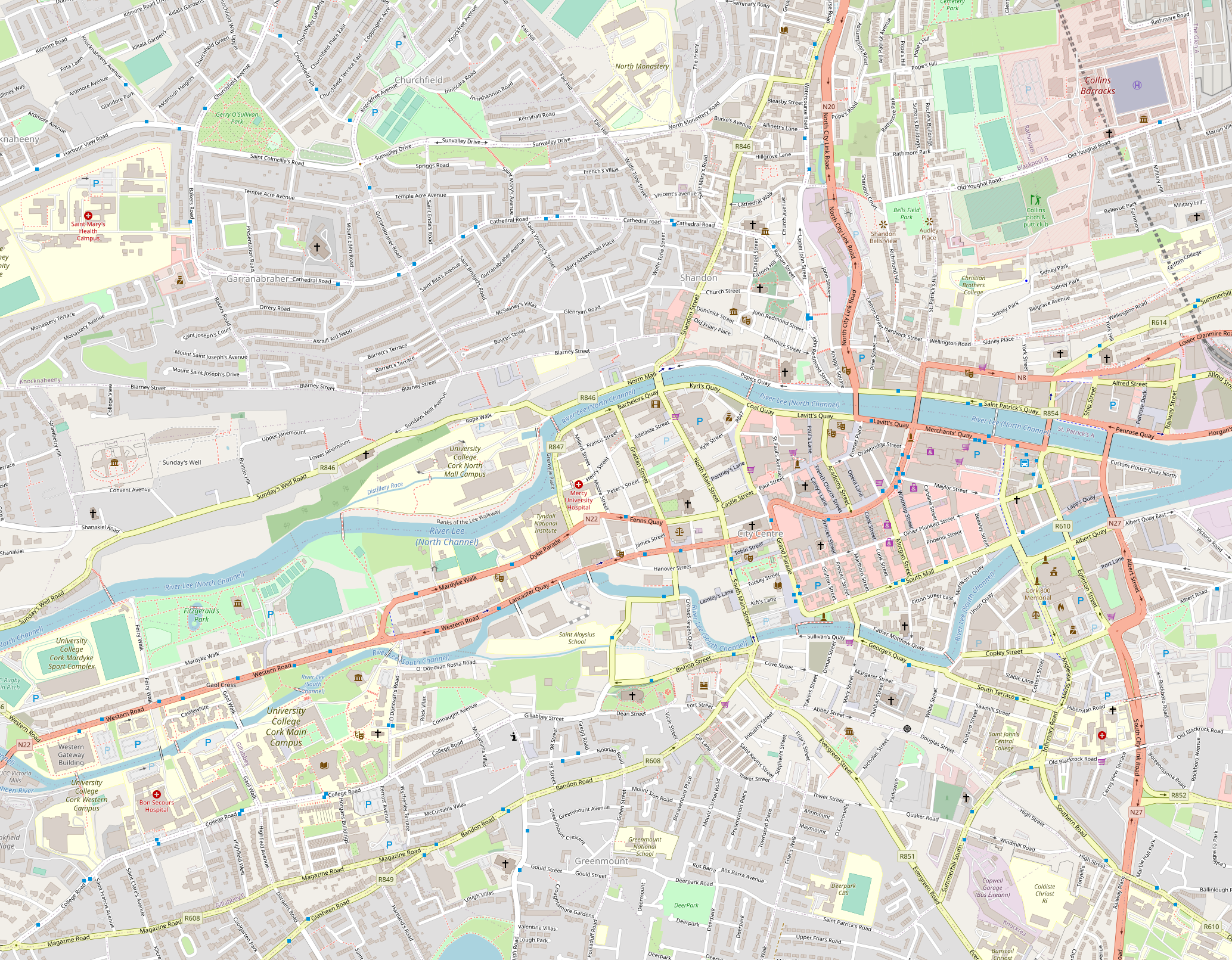
- Location within Cork Central
- Native name: Sráid Washington (Irish)
- Former name: Great George's Street
- Namesake: George Washington
- Length: 500 m (1,600 ft)
- Width: 21 metres (69 ft)
- Location: Cork, Ireland
- Postal code: T12
- Coordinates: 51°53′50″N 8°28′55″W
- west end: St. Finbarr's Road, Lancaster Quay, Woods Street
- Major junctions: South Main Street
- east end: Grand Parade

Other
- Known for: Cork Courthouse, St Augustine's Catholic Church, pubs, restaurants

Washington Street (Irish: Sráid Washington) is a street in central Cork city, Ireland. Built in 1824, it runs from the old medieval town centre onto the site of the western marshes, and today links the Western Road and Lancaster Quay with the Grand Parade.

== History ==
The street, established in 1824, was originally named "Great George's Street" in honour of King George III. In 1918, the people of Cork renamed it as a tribute to George Washington. Popular opinion still holds that the renaming was done to quell altercations involving the local population and American sailors fraternizing with local women.

=== Events ===
In 1921, one member of the public was killed as police lorries on the street were attacked during the Irish War of Independence.

In 2000, one person was killed when the facade of a Washington Street building partially collapsed. Several premises on the street (and the street itself) were closed shortly afterwards to facilitate checks and works on other buildings in the area. The street was, again, temporarily closed in early March 2020 following another structural failure.

== Buildings ==
Larger buildings on Washington Street include Cork Courthouse (1828) and St Augustine's Catholic Church (1942). The street also has a number of bars, nightclubs, and restaurants.

== See also ==
- List of places named for George Washington
