= Strancally Castle =

Country house in County Waterford, Ireland

- Srón Chaillí
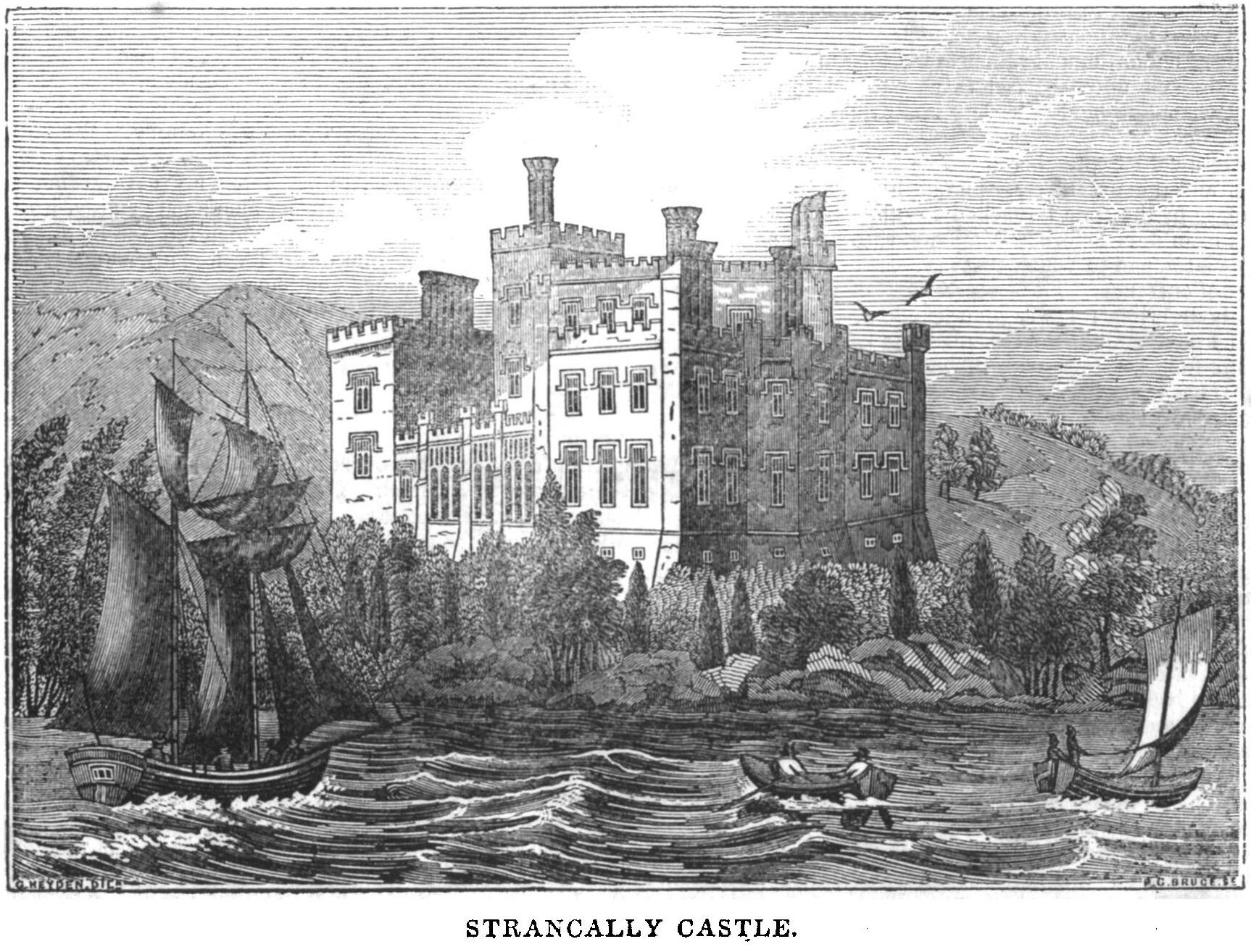
- An illustration from an 1834 edition of the Dublin Penny Journal

General information
- Status: Private dwelling house
- Type: House
- Architectural style: Gothic revival
- Location: Knockanore, Ireland
- Coordinates: 52.0671°N 7.8746°W
- Estimated completion: 1827
- Owner: Mark Zuckerberg (2026)

Technical details
- Material: sandstone and limestone ashlar
- Floor count: 3

Design and construction
- Architects: James Pain and George Richard Pain
- Developer: John Kiely MP
- Designations: Protected structure

Website
- strancallycastle.ie

Strancally Castle (from Irish Srón Chaillí, meaning 'nose of the hag') is a castellated country house in County Waterford, Ireland. It was built around 1827 near the site of an earlier castle overlooking the River Blackwater, close to the town of Tallow, County Waterford and Youghal, County Cork. Several structures in the demesne are listed on the Record of Protected Structures maintained by Waterford City and County Council.

== History ==
=== Early history ===
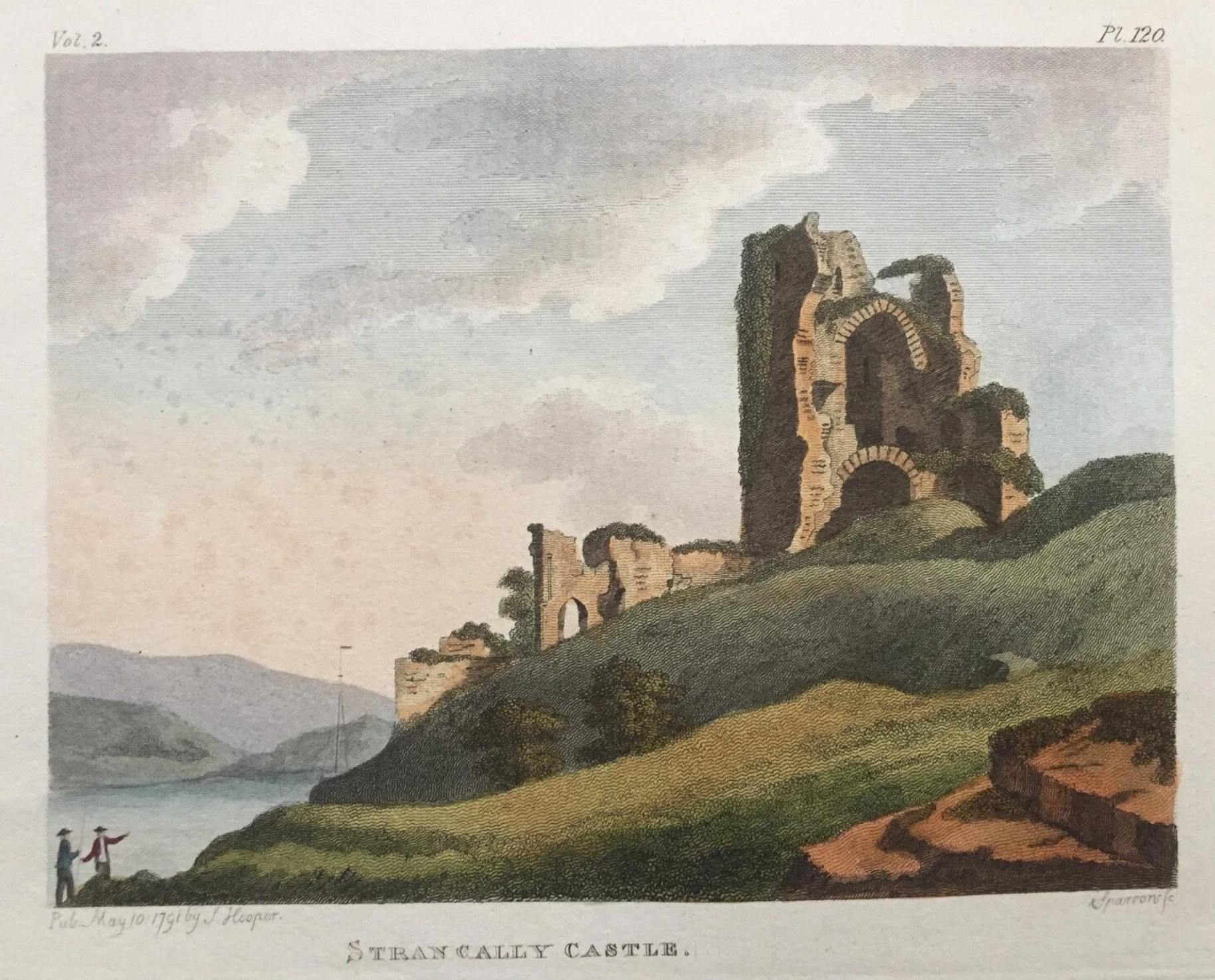
The ruins of Old Strancally Castle, as illustrated in Francis Grose's Antiquities of Ireland in 1791

The original castle at Strancally was reputedly built by Raymond 'le Gros' Fitzgerald at the time of the Anglo-Norman invasion of Ireland in the late 12th century.

By the 16th century, the land around Strancally was controlled by the FitzGerald family, Earls of Desmond. The last FitzGerald (Geraldine) owner of the castle, James Fitzjohn FitzGerald, was executed following the Desmond Rebellion of 1579 and the FitzGerald lands were confiscated by the crown.

In Francis Grose's Antiquities of Ireland, published in 1791, the original castle at Strancally is described as "built on a rock directly over the river". Grose states that the structure had been used by one of the Earls of Desmond as a prison and that, from "a hole cut through the rock in the manner of a portcullis", he cast the bodies of those imprisoned there. Grose's account suggests that, owing to the "horrible practices committed here", the government "ordered both the cave and castle to be demolished" and that "half the castle [was] blown up" with the gun powder "splitting it from top to bottom".

=== 19th century ===
The present building, also known as Strancally Castle, was designed and built around 1827 by James and George Richard Pain. It was built for John Kiely, MP for Clonmel, and the High Sheriff of County Waterford from 1819 to 1820. The 19th century building was built approximately 4.5 km upriver of the original Desmond castle. In Samuel Lewis's Topographical Dictionary of Ireland, published in 1837, the castellated house is described as "a large gothic building, in a richly planted demesne of above 1,000 acres".

The castle, in an estate of 5000 acres, was sold in 1856. It was acquired by George Whitelocke Lloyd, of a wealthy Anglo-Irish manufacturing family, who was later appointed High Sheriff of County Waterford from 1859 to 1860. His son, William Whitelocke Lloyd (1856–1897), was an artist and army officer who fought in the Anglo-Zulu War of 1879. The house and estate remained in the ownership of the Lloyd family into the early 20th century.

=== 20th century ===
The Lloyd family are recorded as still residing at the estate in the 1901, 1911 and 1926 census.

The estate eventually came into the possession of the Irish Land Commission, who sold off the land piecemeal before selling the house with a remaining 160 acres. It later appears to have been owned by Edward Parke Seaton for a period after World War II.

Towards the end of the 20th century, the site was owned by Friedrich Billensteiner and family.

=== 21st century ===
The house was bought by Giancarla Forte, daughter of Charles Forte, Baron Forte, and Michael Alen-Buckley around the year 2000 and restored over a period of 20 years. In 2022, the estate owners, Gianni and Michael Alen-Buckley, were reported by their domestic and maintenance workers to the Workplace Relations Commission. The Spanish anarcho-syndicalist confederation CNT-AIT, and other sections of the International Workers' Association (IWA-AIT), showed their solidarity with the workers, and notified the company of the initiation of a union dispute and the organisation of a range of solidarity actions. The Irish-based Organise! workers association also indicated its support for the workers' demands.

In 2026, Facebook co-founder Mark Zuckerberg acquired the castle and its 440-acre estate in a private sale for over €50 million.
