= Limerick Courthouse =

Courthouse in Limerick, Ireland

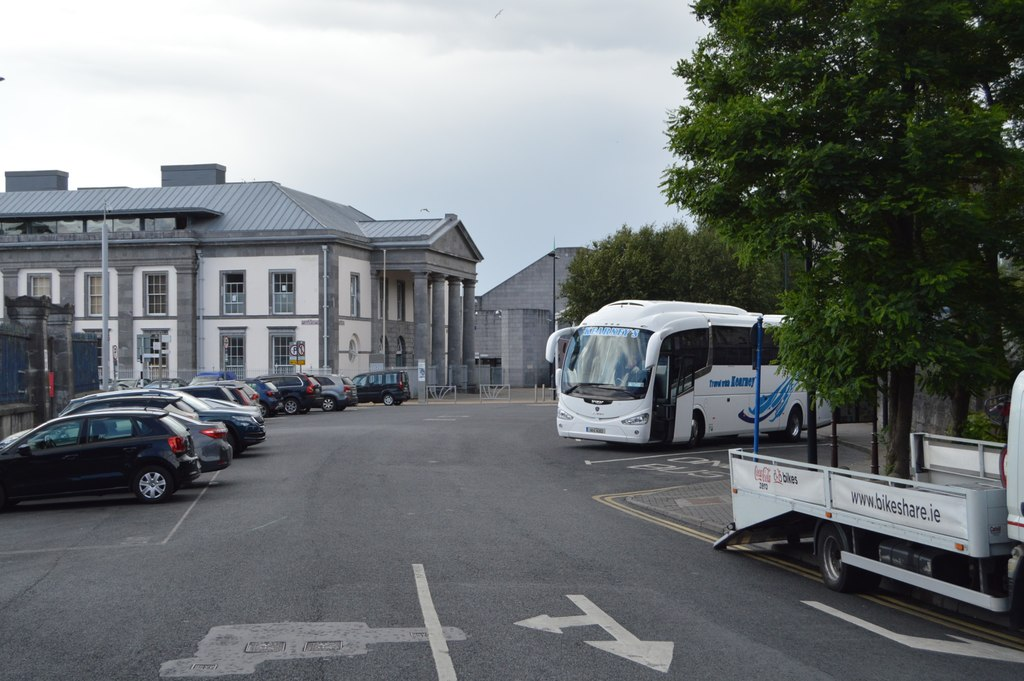
- Limerick Courthouse

- Location within Ireland

General information
- Architectural style: Neoclassical style
- Location: Limerick, County Limerick, Ireland
- Coordinates: 52.6677°N 8.6250°W
- Completed: 1814

Design and construction
- Architects: Nicholas and William Hannan

Limerick Courthouse is a judicial facility at Merchant's Quay, Limerick, County Limerick, Ireland.

== History ==
The courthouse, which was designed by Nicholas and William Hannan in the neoclassical style and built in ashlar stone, was completed in 1814. It was altered by James Pain in 1820. The design involved a symmetrical main frontage facing St Mary's Cathedral; there was a tetrastyle portico with Tuscan order columns supporting an entablature and a pediment.

The building was originally used as a facility for dispensing justice but, following the implementation of the Local Government (Ireland) Act 1898, which established county councils in every county, it also became the meeting place for Limerick County Council. The county council moved to the County Buildings in O'Connell Street in 1911. After a modern courthouse facility was opened in Mulgrave Street in March 2018 to deal with Criminal and District Court matters, the old courthouse at Merchant's Quay remains in use for Circuit Civil and High Court matters.
