= James Pain =

English architect (1779–1877)

- Born: 1779
- Died: 13 December 1877 (aged 97–98)
- Occupation: architect
- Spouse: Harriet Henman
- Relatives: George Richard Pain

James Pain (1779 – 13 December 1877) was an English architect. Born into a family of English architects, his grandfather was William Pain, his father James Pain and his brother George Richard Pain.

== Biography ==
James Pain in Isleworth in Middlesex around 1779, the eldest of at least five sons. He served as an apprentice to the architect John Nash of London. Pain came to Ireland around 1811 to supervise the construction of Lough Cutra Castle in Galway for Nash. He would remain in Ireland the rest of his life.

The Pain brothers were commissioned by the Board of First Fruits to design churches and glebe houses in Ireland. In 1833, Pain became one of the four principal architects of the Board of Ecclesiastical Commissioners. He settled in Limerick, Ireland. Many of his designs were produced in collaboration with his brother, who practised in Cork. It was noted that "James was the better at planning, and was more the man of affairs, whereas George was the draughtsman, and designed the elevations." Pain practised until 1860.

Though often assumed to have lived as a bachelor, there is evidence to suggest that Pain was married to a Harriet Henman, who died in April 1834. Pain died on 13 December 1877, aged 97 at his home, 17 Upper Glentworth Street. In this obituary in the Irish Builder it stated that he "died at his residence in Limerick, at the age of ninety-seven, Mr. James Pain, one of the oldest, if not the oldest, architect in the United Kingdom."

Pain's remains were interred in the Vereker Family Vault, in the grounds of Saint Mary's Cathedral, Limerick, as recorded in the Cathedral burial register. His niece, Sally, had married Henry Vereker of Limerick, to whom he bequeathed a number of items relating to him and her father, George.

== Buildings ==
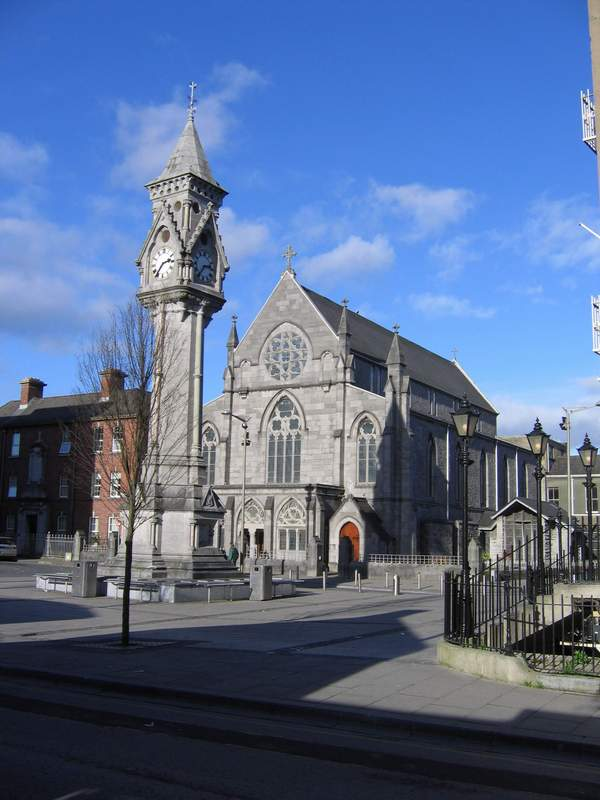
St. Saviour's Dominican Church in Limerick, designed and built in 1815 by the Pain brothers.

- The Market House, Mitchelstown
- O'Neill Crowley Bridge (formerly Brunswick Bridge), Cork
- Saint George's Church, Mitchelstown - now Saint George's Arts and Heritage Centre
- Mitchelstown Castle
- St. James' Church, Mallow, County Cork
- Dromoland Castle, County Clare
- Limerick Gaol
- Athlunkard Bridge
- Strancally Castle, County Waterford
- Pery Square (Tontine terrace), Limerick
- Toll House, Thomond Bridge, Limerick
- St. Michael's Church, Pery Square
- Adare Manor
- Bank of Ireland, O'Connell Street, Limerick
- Clarina Castle
- Blackrock Castle
- St Munchin's Church of Ireland, Limerick
- Limerick Courthouse (alterations)
- Convamore House, Ballyhooly, County Cork
- Castletownroche Church of Ireland Church, County Cork
- Castlehyde Church, Fermoy, County Cork
- Saint Barrahane's Church in Castletownshand, County Cork
