= Tralee Courthouse =

Courthouse in town of Ireland

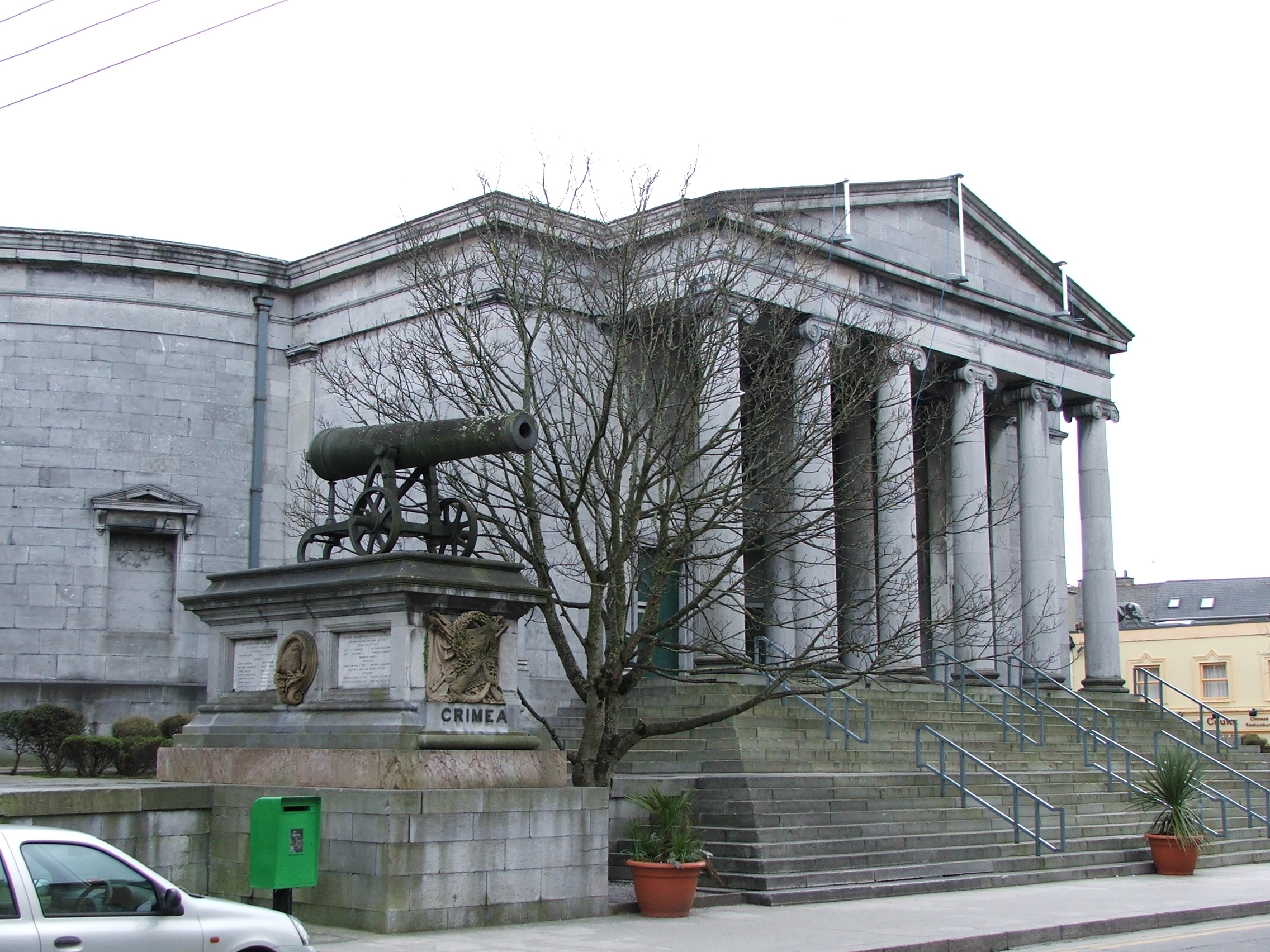
- Tralee Courthouse

- Location within Ireland

General information
- Architectural style: Neoclassical style
- Location: Tralee, County Kerry, Ireland
- Coordinates: 52.2698°N 9.7035°W
- Completed: 1834

Design and construction
- Architect: William Vitruvius Morrison

Tralee Courthouse is a judicial facility in Ashe Street, Tralee, County Kerry, Ireland.

== History ==
The courthouse, which was designed by William Vitruvius Morrison in the neoclassical style and built in ashlar stone, was completed in 1834. The design involved a symmetrical main frontage facing Ashe Street; there was a flight of steps leading up to a large hexastyle portico with Ionic order columns supporting an entablature and a pediment. Two cannons which had been used in the Crimean War (1854–56) and the Indian Rebellion (1857) were brought back to Ireland and installed on the steps of the courthouse as memorials to those Kerrymen who had died in those campaigns.

The building was primarily used as a facility for dispensing justice but, following the implementation of the Local Government (Ireland) Act 1898, which established county councils in every county, the Grand Jury Room also became the meeting place for Kerry County Council. However the county council moved to a purpose-built county hall on Godfrey Place in January 1910. A refurbishment was carried out in the 1980s and the building continues to be used as a judicial facility.
