= Edward Crofton =

Edward Crofton may refer to:

- Edward Crofton, 2nd Baron Crofton (1806–1869), Anglo-Irish Conservative politician
- Sir Edward Crofton, 2nd Baronet (1748–1797), Irish politician
- Edward Crofton (cricketer) (1854–1882), English cricketer
- Sir Edward Crofton, 1st Baronet (1624–1675), of the Crofton baronets
- Sir Edward Crofton, 2nd Baronet (died 1729) (c. 1662–1729), Irish landowner and politician
- Sir Edward Crofton, 3rd Baronet (1687–1739), of the Crofton baronets
- Sir Edward Crofton, 4th Baronet (1713–1745), of the Crofton baronets
- Sir Edward Crofton, 3rd Baronet (1778–1816), of the Crofton baronets

== See also ==
- Crofton (disambiguation)
