= Crofton family =

Anglo-Irish noble family

The Crofton Family is an Anglo-Irish noble family holding titles in the Peerage of Ireland and The Baronetage of the United Kingdom.

== Baron Crofton ==
The Crofton family is divided into three main branches, all holding titles in their own right. The Crofton estate in the townland of Ballymurray in County Roscommon was first granted to John Crofton during the reign of Queen Elizabeth I. He was the first occupier, having been appointed Auditor General in 1584. In addition to this estate, he also obtained extensive grants of lands elsewhere in the county as well as in counties Leitrim and Sligo. It was not until 1661 that a Crofton obtained a title however, when Edward Crofton became a Baronet of the Mote for services rendered to Charles II during the Cromwellian rebellion. This is now a subsidiary title to that of Baron Crofton.

The title of Baron Crofton of the Mote is the most senior. It was created in 1797 (as Baroness Crofton) for Dame Anne Crofton. She was the widow of Sir Edward Crofton, 2nd Baronet, of the Mote, who had represented Roscommon in the Irish House of Commons and had been offered a peerage just before his death. The peerage was instead bestowed upon his widow. She was succeeded by her grandson, the second Baron, who had already succeeded as fourth Baronet. He sat in the House of Lords as an Irish representative peer from 1840 to 1869 and served as a Lord-in-waiting (government whip in the House of Lords) in the three Conservative administrations of the Earl of Derby and in Benjamin Disraeli's first government. His son, the third Baron, served as an Irish representative peer between 1873 and 1912 and was also State Steward to the Lord Lieutenant of Ireland. His nephew, the fourth Baron, was an Irish representative peer from 1916 to 1942. Edward, 3rd baron Crofton, was a noted composer and became a Representative Peer for Ireland in 1873. As of 2014 the titles are held by the latter's great-great-grandson, the eighth Baron, who succeeded his father in 2007.

== Crofton of Longford House ==
This branch is now the older male branch of the Crofton family in Ireland. Edward Crofton of Longford House in the County of Sligo was granted a Baronetcy in 1661. However, this title became extinct with Sir Oliver Crofton, 5th Bt. in 1780. The Crofton Baronetcy, of Longford House in the County of Sligo, was created in the Baronetage of the United Kingdom on 18 August 1838 for Sir James Crofton. Head of the elder male branch of the family, Sir James was also a Major of the Sligo Militia and Deputy Lieutenant of the County. He was descended from Thomas Crofton, uncle of the first Baronet of the 1661 creation.

The family seat remains Longford House, County Sligo.

== Crofton of Mohill ==
The Croftons of Mohill Castle settled in Ireland in 1643 following a patent from Charles I. Although this branch of the family was of some distinction, they remained untitled until 1801. The Crofton Baronetcy, of Mohill in the County of Leitrim, was created in the Baronetage of the United Kingdom on 10 August 1801 for Morgan Crofton. The sixth Baronet was a Lieutenant-Colonel in the 2nd Life Guards and fought in the Second Boer War, where he was severely wounded at the Relief of Ladysmith, and in the two world wars. His diaries from the First World War are published as "Massacre of the Innocents: The Crofton Diaries, Ypres 1914–1915", 2004. Another member of the family, James Crofton, grandson of Morgan Crofton, third son of the first Baronet, was a Lieutenant-General in the Army.

The family seat remains Mohill Castle, County Leitrim.

== Property ==
The total holdings of the Croftons in County Roscommon consisted of 11,053 acres, according to the Bateman Edition of Great Landowners of Great Britain and Ireland in 1883. The size of the Mote Park House estate in Ballymurray consisted of c.7000 acres. Although this was a sizeable estate, when compared with others such as the Essex properties consisting of the town of Roscommon itself and extensive lands to the north, totalling some 36,000 acres, it clearly was not the largest.

Mote Park House was built by the Crofton family in the latter half of the eighteenth century, preceding the Castle of Mote erected by the family in 1620.

Crofton House (at Mote Park) was clearly an imposing structure and reflects the influence of neo-classicism prevalent at this time. This style emphasises for the first time a sense of permanence and security among the landowning class. The house was the most impressive of its type built in County Roscommon, the others of this period being located at Runnamoat near Ballymoe, and Sandford House in Castlerea. The house was originally an irregular two-storey-over-basement house, which the architect Richard Morrison more than doubled in size by adding six bays and an extra storey. It had a deep hall with a screen of columns, beyond which a door flanked by niches led into an oval library in the bow on the garden front. These gardens contained many fine architectural features, some of which are still intact. Perhaps the most splendid surviving feature is the original entrance gate consisting of a Doric triumphal arch surmounted by a lion with screen walls linking two identical lodge houses. In 1865 a fire destroyed the entire house at Mote Park, as another had destroyed their castle a century previously. While the house was being rebuilt in 1866, the family occupied the old barrack room in the farmyard. Following the death of Lord Henry, his nephew, Arthur Edward Crofton became the last of the Croftons to reside at Mote but moved to England in the 1940s.

== Family heraldry ==
- Arms:' Per pale indented Or and Azure a Lion passant guardant counterchanged
- Crest: Seven Ears of Wheat growing on one stalk proper
- Supporters; Dexter: a Lion Azure; Sinister: a Stag proper
- Motto: Dat Deus Incrementum God gives the increase

== Crofton baronets, of The Mote (1661) ==
- Sir Edward Crofton, 1st Baronet (1624–1675)
- Sir Edward Crofton, 2nd Baronet (c.1662–1729)
- Sir Edward Crofton, 3rd Baronet (1687–1739)
- Sir Edward Crofton, 4th Baronet (1713–1745)
- Sir Oliver Crofton, 5th Baronet (1710–1780)

== Crofton baronets, of The Mote (1758) ==
- See the Baron Crofton

== Crofton baronets, of Mohill (1801) ==
- Sir Morgan Crofton, 1st Baronet (1733–1802)
- Sir Hugh Crofton, 2nd Baronet (1763–1834)
- Sir Morgan George Crofton, 3rd Baronet (1788–1867)
- Sir Morgan George Crofton, 4th Baronet (1850–1900)
- Sir Hugh Denis Crofton, 5th Baronet (1878–1902)
- Sir Morgan George Crofton, 6th Baronet (1879–1958)
- Sir Patrick Simon Crofton, 7th Baronet (1936–1987)
- Sir (Hugh) Denis Crofton, 8th Baronet (1937–2016)
- Sir Edward Morgan Crofton, 9th Baronet (b.1945)

The heir apparent is his son Henry Morgan Crofton (born 1979)

== Crofton baronets, of Longford House (1838) ==
- Sir James Crofton, 1st Baronet (1776–1849)
- Sir Malby Crofton, 2nd Baronet (1797–1872)
- Sir Malby Crofton, 3rd Baronet (1857–1926)
- Sir (Malby Richard) Henry Crofton, 4th Baronet (1881–1962)
- Sir Malby Sturges Crofton, 5th Baronet (1923–2002)
- Sir Henry Edward Melville Crofton, 6th Baronet (1931–2003)
- Sir Julian Malby Crofton, 7th Baronet (1958–2018)
- Sir William Robert Malby Crofton, 8th Baronet (born 1996)
