= Crofton =

Crofton may refer to:

== People ==
- Crofton (surname)
- Baron Crofton, a title in the Peerage of Ireland
- Crofton baronets, a title in the Baronetage on the United Kingdom
- Crofton family, Noble family

== Places ==
=== Canada ===
- Crofton, British Columbia, a town in the province of British Columbia, Canada
- Crofton House School

=== New Zealand ===
- Crofton Downs

=== United Kingdom ===
- Crofton, Cumbria, in Thursby Parish
- Crofton, London, a neighbourhood in Orpington
- Crofton, Hampshire, an area of Stubbington
- Crofton, West Yorkshire a village near Wakefield
  - Crofton TMD, a traction maintenance depot at Crofton, West Yorkshire
- Crofton Pumping Station in the county of Wiltshire
- Crofton Locks in the county of Wiltshire
- Crofton Park, south east London

=== United States ===
- Crofton, Kentucky
- Crofton, Maryland
- Crofton, Nebraska

== Other uses ==
- Crofton formula
- Crofton weed (Ageratina adenophora), a noxious weed, native to Mexico
