= Gorges Lowther =

Gorges Lowther may refer to:

- Gorges Lowther (1769–1854), Irish Member of Parliament
- Gorges Lowther (1713–1792), Irish Member of Parliament

== See also ==
- George Lowther (disambiguation)
