= George Lowther =

George Lowther may refer to:

- George Lowther (pirate) (died 1723), English pirate
- George Lowther (writer) (1913–1975), American writer, producer, director for radio and television
- George Lowther (died 1716), Irish Member of Parliament for Ratoath
- George Lowther (1739–1784), Irish Member of Parliament for Ratoath, Ardee and Newtownards
- George W. Lowther (1822–1898), Massachusetts state representative and civil rights activist

== See also ==
- Gorges Lowther (disambiguation)
