= John Curtis (Irish politician) =

Irish politician

John Curtis (died 1775) was an Irish politician.

Curtis was a Member of Parliament representing Ratoath in the Irish House of Commons between 1761 and 1768.

Parliament of Ireland
Preceded by Sir Marcus Lowther-Crofton, Bt; Gorges Lowther	Member of Parliament for Ratoath; 1761–1768; With: George Lowther	Succeeded by George Lowther; John Cramer
