= Crofton (surname) =

Crofton is a surname. Notable people with the surname include:

- Anne Crofton, 1st Baroness Crofton (1751–1817), Irish peeress in her own right
- C. S. F. Crofton (1873–1909), British philatelist and a member of the Indian Civil Service
- Eileen Crofton (1919–2010), Scottish physician, anti-smoking campaigner and author
- Edward Crofton (disambiguation), several people
- Guy Crofton, 7th Baron Crofton (1951–2007), Anglo-Irish officer in the British Army
- John Crofton (1912–2009), Anglo-Irish physician, pioneer in the treatment of tuberculosis
- Kathleen Crofton (died 1982), English dancer, dance director and dance teacher
- Meg Crofton (born 1953), American businesswoman, Walt Disney World Resort
- Morgan Crofton (1826–1915), Irish mathematician
- Patrick Crofton (1935–2016), Canadian politician
- Walter Crofton (1815–1897), Anglo-Irish prison administrator and penal reformer
- Zachary Crofton (1626–1672), Anglo-Irish nonconforming minister and controversialist
