= Sir Edward Crofton, 3rd Baronet =

Sir Edward Crofton, 3rd Baronet may refer to:

- Sir Edward Crofton, 3rd Baronet (1687–1739)
- Sir Edward Crofton, 3rd Baronet (1778–1816), son of Sir Edward Crofton, 2nd Baronet
