= Garrett Dillon =

Irish judge, politician, and soldier

Garrett (or Gerard or Gerald) Dillon (c.1640–after 1710) was an Irish judge, politician and soldier, who held the office of Recorder of Dublin. He was one of the signatories of the Treaty of Limerick, which he helped to negotiate. The refusal of the Irish Parliament to ratify the Treaty led to his downfall. He fled abroad and died in exile in France.

== Background ==
He was born in County Westmeath, the son of Theobald Dillon of Portlick Castle and his wife Marcella Browne. Theobald was the son of Garrett Dillon of Feamore, County Mayo, a cousin of Theobald Dillon, 1st Viscount Dillon. Portlick had been in the Dillon family for centuries. The younger Garrett inherited both Feamore and Portlick, and acquired other estates in Westmeath, Roscommon and Mayo. All his estates were forfeited in the 1690s. His eldest son Theobald held on to some of the family estates, but not Portlick Castle, which was acquired by the Smyth family, who lived there until 1955. The castle is still in private ownership.

== Career ==
He entered Gray's Inn in 1669, and was called to the Irish Bar in 1674. He built up a flourishing practice on the Connacht circuit. The Roman Catholic King James II of England, who succeeded to the throne in 1685, adopted a policy of appointing as many Catholics as possible to high office. Dillon was described as a "furious" (i.e. passionate) Catholic and was in favour with the King as a result; yet he also had Protestant friends and was described as a man suitable for Crown service, as he was "a very fit man for office, and we should not omit the best". His rise to high office was rapid: he became King's Counsel and Recorder of Dublin in 1685, and Prime Serjeant in 1687. In the so-called Patriot Parliament of 1689 he sat in the Irish House of Commons as member for Mullingar. On the outbreak of the Williamite War, he entered the armed service on King James's side and was made a colonel.

== The Treaty of Limerick and afterwards ==
After the defeat of the Jacobite cause, the new King William III of England was anxious to conciliate as many of his former opponents as possible. One result of this policy was the negotiation of the Treaty of Limerick, which was strictly speaking two treaties, one military and one civil. Dillon (who had been dismissed from all his political offices) was one of the three lawyers, the others being John Brown and Sir Toby Butler, who negotiated the civil articles on behalf of the defeated Jacobite side, although Butler is believed to have done most of the hard work.

The Treaty articles were signed by Dillon and his colleagues on 3 October 1691. The terms were surprisingly generous to the defeated side. In particular, the Treaty provided that those Jacobites who swore an oath of loyalty to the new regime who be permitted to retain their lands. Unfortunately for the Jacobites, the Parliament of Ireland was not prepared to abide by the terms of the Treaty, which it regarded as far too generous to the Jacobites. After months of acrimonious debate, Parliament was prorogued without a vote on the Treaty, which was never ratified. Life for Catholics who had supported King James became increasingly difficult; while his co-signatories, Butler and Brown, were left in peace, Dillon was proscribed and deprived of 4700 acres of his lands, and left the country. He joined King James in France, and became a colonel in his regiment in 1693. He died a few years later, greatly mourned, according to Burke, as a man of "integrity, eloquence, learning and worth".

== Family ==
Dillon married firstly in 1677 Susanna Clifford, daughter of Thomas Clifford of Devon, and widow of Sir Edward Crofton, 1st Baronet of the Crofton Baronets of the Mote, County Roscommon (who had died in 1675). Dillon and Susanna had no children, although Susanna had at least one son, Edward, from her first marriage, who succeeded his father as second Baronet in 1675.

Sir Edward and his stepfather were political opponents, and perhaps also personal enemies, and Susanna's death sometime before 1689 broke the family tie between the two men. Edward was a convinced supporter of the Glorious Revolution, and no doubt for that reason the Patriot Parliament, of which Dillon was a prominent member, attainted him. After the downfall of the Jacobite cause, Edward quickly recovered his lands and went on to have a successful political career. There is no reason to think that he made any move to help his stepfather, nor perhaps could Dillon, after his own conduct in the Patriot Parliament, have expected any favours from Edward.

Dillon married secondly, before 1690, Mary Hamilton, posthumous daughter of George Hamilton, 4th Baron Hamilton of Strabane and his wife Elizabeth Fagan, daughter and heiress of Christopher Fagan of Feltrim, by whom he had Theobald, his eldest son and heir, who managed to retain at least part of the family estate, and several other children born in France, at the Jacobite court of Saint-Germain en Laye
