= SSLA =

SSLA may refer to:

- South Sudan Liberation Movement
- Society of Science, Letters and Art
