= Sir Edward Crofton, 2nd Baronet (died 1729) =

Sir Edward Crofton, 2nd Baronet (c.1662 – 24 November 1729) was an Irish landowner and politician, who sat in the Irish House of Commons for more than thirty years, and served briefly as a member of the Privy Council of Ireland.

== Family ==
He was born at Mote Park, near Roscommon town, the only surviving son of Sir Edward Crofton, 1st Baronet, and his second wife Susanna Clifford, daughter of Thomas Clifford of Devon. The Crofton family had come to Ireland from England in the sixteenth century and acquired substantial estates in Roscommon. The elder Sir Edward was noted for his loyalty to the Stuart dynasty during the English Civil War, and at the Restoration of Charles II he was rewarded by being created a baronet, the first of the Crofton Baronets. Less is known for certain of Susanna's background, but there is a tradition in the Crofton family that she belonged to a junior branch of the family of Baron Clifford of Chudleigh.

Two years after his father's death in 1675 his mother remarried Garrett Dillon, a prominent Roman Catholic barrister who during the reign of the Catholic King James II of England rose to a position of political influence, and was appointed Recorder of Dublin. Garrett and his stepson seem to have been estranged by the time of the Glorious Revolution of 1688, which found them on opposite sides, and Susanna's death sometime before 1689 broke the family tie between them.

== After the Glorious Revolution ==
When James II landed in Ireland, in order to recover the three kingdoms, Edward's stepfather Garrett Dillon remained loyal to his cause and sat in the so-called Patriot Parliament of 1689. Edward, who was described as a young man of "sturdy and resolute character", was, by contrast, a convinced supporter of the Revolution of 1688. He greatly admired King William III of England, even composing verses in his honour. In consequence, the Patriot Parliament attainted him, and he fled to London with his wife and two young sons; his wife died while they were in England. After the Battle of the Boyne, which effectively destroyed the Jacobite cause, Edward's lands were quickly restored to him. By contrast, his stepfather was subject to increasing harassment during the 1690s; he eventually fled the country and died in exile in France. There is no evidence that Edward interceded on his behalf: on the contrary, it is likely that he wanted revenge on Garrett for voting in the Patriot Parliament, of which he was an influential member, to attaint him.

He was MP for Boyle in the Parliament of Ireland of 1695–99, and for Roscommon from 1703 to 1727. He was a member of the Privy Council in 1713–4. He died in 1729.

== Descendants ==
He married in 1685 Katherine, daughter of Sir Oliver St George, 1st Baronet, and his wife Olivia Beresford. Katherine died in 1689 or 1690. They had two sons:

- Sir Edward Crofton, 3rd Baronet
- Oliver, who became a soldier, and died during the Quebec Expedition of 1711; he was the father of
  - Sir Oliver Crofton, 5th Baronet.

Edward's male line ended with the 5th Baronet's death in 1780. The Crofton baronets of the second creation, who later acquired the title Baron Crofton, are his descendants in the female line through Edward's granddaughter Catherine Crofton, daughter of Sir Edward Crofton, 3rd Baronet. Catherine married Sir Marcus Lowther-Crofton, 1st Baronet.

Baronetage of Ireland
Preceded by Edward Crofton	Baronet (of The Mote); 1675–1729	Succeeded by Edward Crofton
