= Crofton Baronets of The Mote (first creation, 1661) =

The Crofton Baronetcy, of The Mote in County Roscommon, was created in the Baronetage of Ireland on 1 July 1661 for Edward Crofton, as a reward for his record of loyalty to King Charles II during the English Civil War. He sat in the Irish House of Commons as member for Lanesborough, and served as High Sheriff of Roscommon and High Sheriff of Leitrim. He was succeeded in the title by his son Edward, the second Baronet, who sat in the Irish House of Commons as member first for Boyle, and subsequently for County Roscommon, and was a member of the Privy Council of Ireland in 1713–14. He was a prominent opponent of King James II of England, and was attainted by the Patriot Parliament of 1689, but recovered his estates the following year. His eldest son, the third baronet, also represented Roscommon in the House of Commons. The title became extinct on the death of the fifth Baronet in 1780.

== Crofton baronets, of The Mote (1661) ==
- Sir Edward Crofton, 1st Baronet (1624–1675)
- Sir Edward Crofton, 2nd Baronet (c.1662–1729)
- Sir Edward Crofton, 3rd Baronet (1687–1739)
- Sir Edward Crofton, 4th Baronet (1713–1745)
- Sir Oliver Crofton, 5th Baronet (1710–1780)

== See also ==
- Baron Crofton#Crofton baronets, of the Mote (1758)
