= Edward Synge =

Edward Synge may refer to:

- Edward Synge (bishop of Cork, Cloyne and Ross) (died 1678), previously Bishop of Limerick, Ardfert and Aghadoe
- Edward Synge (archbishop of Tuam) (1659–1741), previously Bishop of Raphoe
- Edward Synge (bishop of Elphin) (1691–1762), previously Bishop of Clonfert & Kilmacduagh, Bishop of Cloyne, and Bishop of Ferns & Leighlin
- Edward Hutchinson Synge (1890–1957), inventor of the near-field optical microscope
- Edward Synge (priest) (1726–1792), Anglican priest in Ireland
