= Synge baronets =

Baronetcy in the Baronetage of the United Kingdom

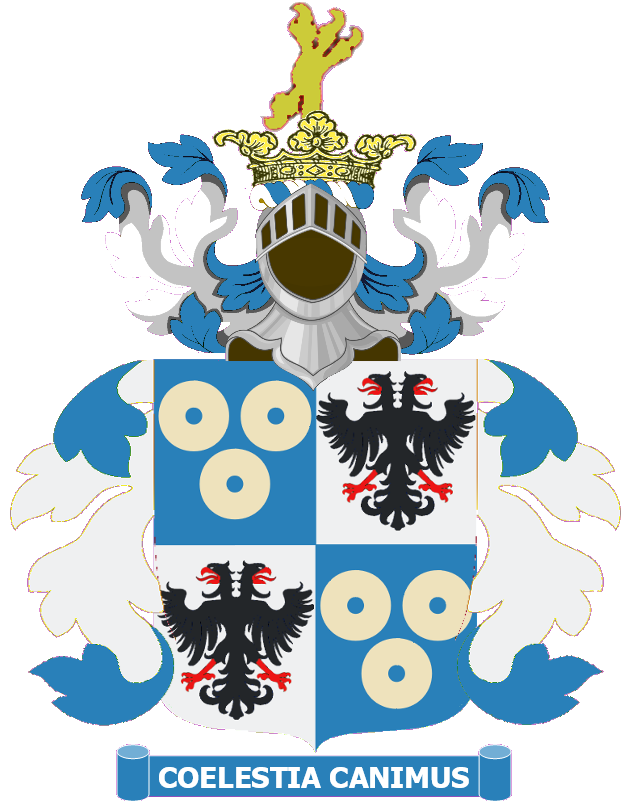
Escutcheon: Quarterly 1st & 4th Azure three millstones Proper 2nd & 3rd Argent an eagle displayed with two heads Sable beaked and legged Gules. Crest: Out of a ducal coronet Or an eagle's claw Proper. Motto: Coelestia Canimus

The Synge Baronetcy, of Kiltrough in the County of Meath, is a title in the Baronetage of the United Kingdom. It was created on 12 August 1801 for Robert Synge. The third Baronet served as High Sheriff of County Cork in 1844. The family surname is pronounced "Sing". As of 28 February 2014 the present Baronet has not successfully proven his succession and is therefore not on the Official Roll of the Baronetage, with the baronetcy considered dormant since 2011.

Samuel Synge, brother of the first Baronet, succeeded his great-uncle in the Hutchinson Baronetcy, of Castlesallagh in 1813 according to a special remainder in the letters patent. See this title for more information on this branch of the family.

== Synge baronets, of Kiltrough (1801) ==
- Sir Robert Synge, 1st Baronet (died 1804)
- Sir Edward Synge, 2nd Baronet (1786–1843)
- Sir Edward Synge, 3rd Baronet (1809–1884)
- Sir Noah Hill Neale Synge, 4th Baronet (1811–1886)
- Sir Robert Synge, 5th Baronet (1812–1894)
- Sir Francis Robert Millington Synge, 6th Baronet (1851–1924)
- Sir Robert Millington Synge, 7th Baronet (1877–1942)
- Sir Robert Carson Synge, 8th Baronet (1922–2011)
- Sir Allen James Edward Synge, 9th Baronet (born 1942)

== See also ==
- Hutchinson Baronetcy, of Castlesallagh

== Notes ==
Baronetage of the United Kingdom
Preceded by Crofton baronets	Synge baronets of Kiltrough; 12 August 1801	Succeeded by Pole baronets
