= Crofton Baronets of Longford House (1838) =

The Crofton baronetcy, of Longford House in the County of Sligo, was created in the Baronetage of the United Kingdom on 18 August 1838 for James Crofton. He was descended from Thomas Crofton, uncle of the 1st Baronet of the 1661 creation.

Escutcheon of the Crofton baronets of Longford House

== Crofton baronets, of Longford House (1838) ==
- Sir James Crofton, 1st Baronet (1776–1849)
- Sir Malby Crofton, 2nd Baronet (1797–1872)
- Sir Malby Crofton, 3rd Baronet (1857–1926)
- Sir (Malby Richard) Henry Crofton, 4th Baronet (1881–1962)
- Sir Malby Sturges Crofton, 5th Baronet (1923–2002)
- Sir Henry Edward Melville Crofton, 6th Baronet (1931–2003)
- Sir Julian Malby Crofton, 7th Baronet (1958–2018)
- Sir William Robert Malby Crofton, 8th Baronet (born 1996)

The heir presumptive is Edward James Crofton (born 1998), younger brother of the present holder.

== Notes ==
Baronetage of the United Kingdom
Preceded by Clayton-East baronets	Crofton Baronets of Longford House; 18 August 1838	Succeeded by Crampton baronets
