= Peter Metge =

Irish politician and judge

Peter Metge (c. 1740–1809) was an Irish politician and judge of the eighteenth and early nineteenth centuries. He was a colourful character, who was noted for his fondness for duelling, and for his unorthodox private life.

== Biography ==
He was born in Athlumney, County Meath, the second son of Peter Metge and his wife Anne Lyon, who died in 1792. Anne was reputedly a relative of the Bowes-Lyon family.

His grandfather, Peter de la Metgée (1665-1735), was a French Huguenot who fled to Ireland to avoid religious persecution after the revocation of the Edict of Nantes in 1685. John Metge (died after 1823), who served as MP for Ratoath, and after the Act of Union 1800 as MP for Dundalk (though it is doubtful if he ever took his seat at Westminster), was the judge's younger brother.

He was a graduate of Trinity College Dublin, where he took his degree of Bachelor of Arts in 1763.

== Private life ==
He married Sophia Crofton, daughter of Sir Marcus Lowther-Crofton, 1st Baronet of The Mote, County Roscommon, and his wife Catherine Crofton. They had two children, a son Peter who died at 17, and a daughter who died young.

Sophia died in 1777. A few years afterwards, Peter began a lifelong relationship with a woman named Eleanor Archdeacon. Little is known about her, but Peter sometimes referred to her as his wife. They had at least six children. Whether or not he and Eleanor ever went through a formal marriage ceremony is uncertain.

After his retirement from the Bench, he lived mainly in Bath.

== Career ==
He entered the Middle Temple in 1762 and was called to the Irish Bar in 1769. He sat in the Irish House of Commons as member for Ardee in 1776 and subsequently for Ratoath in 1783 (where he was succeeded as MP by his brother John; it was effectively in the gift of Peter's father-in-law's family, the Lowthers). He became Third Serjeant in 1782 and was briefly Judge of the Irish Court of Admiralty; he also served as Portreeve (i.e. Warden) of Navan in 1754. He was made a Bencher of the King's Inns in 1783. At the end of 1783 he became a Baron of the Court of Exchequer (Ireland). He retired in 1801 and died in 1809. He left his estate to his children by Eleanor Archdeacon, who was by then deceased, and whom he apparently regarded as his second wife, although there is no conclusive evidence that they were legally married.

Peter's mother Anne, who died in 1792, had left him nothing in her will: according to family tradition, this was because she knew about and deeply disapproved of his relationship with Eleanor.

== Character ==
Elrington Ball describes Metge as a "fire-eater", who was quarrelsome and hot-tempered, with a passion for duelling, a passion shared by his brother John. The number of duels he fought was not in itself remarkable by the standards of the time, but he was considered eccentric for fighting his own brother-in-law, Sir Edward Crofton, 2nd Baronet.

The statesman Edward Cooke had a very poor opinion of Metge as a judge (as he did of most Irish judges of that era) describing him as being "as insolent as he is ignorant". On the other hand, Lord Charlemont is said to have thought highly of him. The care he lavished on his out-of-wedlock children by Eleanor Archdeacon shows the kinder side of his nature.
