= Sir Edward Crofton, 4th Baronet =

Anglo-Irish politician

Sir Edward Crofton, 4th Baronet (12 April 1713 – 26 March 1745) was an Anglo-Irish politician.

== Family ==
Crofton was the son of Sir Edward Crofton, 3rd Baronet and Mary Nixon. He represented County Roscommon in the Irish House of Commons between 1735 and his death in 1745. He succeeded to his father's baronetcy on 11 November 1739. He married Martha Damer, daughter of Joseph Damer and Mary Churchill, on 17 June 1741.

== Education ==
Crofton entered Trinity College Dublin on 19 May 17300.

== Political career ==
He represented County Roscommon in the Irish House of Commons between 1735 and his death in 1745.

== Military career ==
He served in the British Army and was killed near Tournai during the War of the Austrian Succession. He died without children and was succeeded by his relation, Oliver. The later Crofton Baronets were descendants of Edward's sister Catherine, who married Sir Marcus Lowther-Crofton, 1st Baronet.

=== Widow's re-marriage ===
His widow remarried Ezekiel Nisbett, an Irish medical doctor and President of the Royal College of Physicians of Ireland.

== See also ==
- Crofton Baronets of The Mote (first creation, 1661)

Parliament of Ireland
Preceded by Nicholas Mahon; Sir Henry King, Bt	Member of Parliament for County Roscommon; 1735–1745; With: Sir Henry King, Bt (1735–1741); Henry Sandford (1741–1745)	Succeeded by John French; Henry Sandford
Baronetage of Ireland
Preceded by Edward Crofton	Baronet (of The Mote); 1739–1745	Succeeded by Oliver Crofton
