= Synge-Hutchinson baronets =

Extinct baronetcy in the Baronetage of Ireland

The Hutchinson, later Synge-Hutchinson Baronetcy, of Castlesallagh in the County of Wicklow, was a title in the Baronetage of Ireland. It was created on 11 December 1782 for Francis Hutchinson, Member of the Irish Parliament for Jamestown. He was the son of The Right Reverend Samuel Hutchinson, Bishop of Killala and Achonry. On the death of the second Baronet in 1813, the title was inherited by Samuel Synge (who assumed the additional surname of Hutchinson) according to a special remainder in the letters patent. He was the nephew of the first and second Baronets and the brother of Sir Robert Synge, 1st Baronet, of Kiltrough (see Synge baronets for more information on this branch of the family). In 1844 he served as high sheriff of County Cork. The title became extinct on the death of the fourth Baronet in 1906.

== Hutchinson, later Synge-Hutchinson baronets, of Castlesallagh (1782) ==
Escutcheon of the Synge-Hutchinson baronets of Castlesallagh

- Sir Francis Hutchinson, 1st Baronet (c. 1726–1807)
- Sir James Hutchinson, 2nd Baronet (c. 1732–1813)
- Sir Samuel Synge-Hutchinson, 3rd Baronet (1756–1846)
- Sir Edward Synge-Hutchinson, 4th Baronet (1830–1906), grandson of the 3rd Baronet
