= Edward Crofton, 2nd Baron Crofton =

Anglo-Irish Conservative politician (1806–1869)

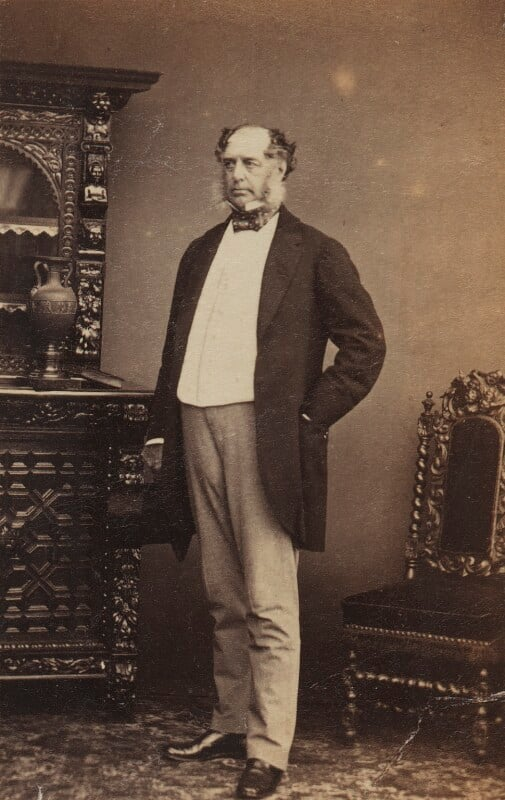
Crofton in the 1860s

Edward Crofton, 2nd Baron Crofton (1 August 1806 – 17 December 1869), known as Sir Edward Crofton, 4th Baronet, from 1816 to 1817, was an Anglo-Irish Conservative politician.

Crofton was the son of Sir Edward Crofton, 3rd Baronet, son of Sir Edward Crofton, 2nd Baronet, and his wife Anne Crofton, 1st Baroness Crofton. His mother was Lady Charlotte, daughter of John Stewart, 7th Earl of Galloway. He succeeded his father in the baronetcy in 1816 and the following year he inherited the barony of Crofton on the death of his grandmother. Crofton was elected an Irish representative peer in 1840, and served in the Conservative administrations of the Earl of Derby and Benjamin Disraeli as a Lord-in-waiting (government whip in the House of Lords) in 1852, from 1858 to 1859 and from 1866 to 1868.

Lord Crofton married Lady Georgina, daughter of Henry Paget, 1st Marquess of Anglesey, in 1833. He died in December 1869, aged 63, and was succeeded in his titles by his eldest son Edward. Lady Crofton died in 1875.

His children included the photographer Augusta Caroline Crofton.

Peerage of Ireland
Preceded by Anne Crofton	Baron Crofton; 1817–1869	Succeeded by Edward Henry Churchill Crofton
Baronetage of Ireland
Preceded by Edward Crofton	Baronet (of the Mote); 1816–1869	Succeeded by Edward Henry Churchill Crofton
Political offices
Preceded by The Earl of Kingston	Representative peer for Ireland; 1840–1869	Succeeded by The Earl of Lanesborough
