= Achilles Daunt =

Irish clergyman (1832-1878)

Achilles Daunt (1832–1878) was a noted Irish preacher and homilist, and Church of Ireland Dean of Cork.

== Early life and education ==
Achilles Daunt descended from a cadet branch of the Daunt family of Owlpen, Gloucestershire, settled since 1575 at Tracton Abbey, County Cork. He was the eldest son of Achilles Daunt who died 28 August 1871, by Mary, third daughter of John Isaac Heard, Member of Parliament for Kinsale.

He was born at Rincurran, near Kinsale, on 23 August 1832. He was educated at Kinsale endowed school, and at the age of sixteen entered Trinity College Dublin, where he gained a classical scholarship, and was awarded the vice-chancellor's prize for English poetry in 1851. At the degree examination in 1853 he came out second senior moderator and gold medallist in classics.

== Preacher ==
He held the curacy of St. Matthias' Church, Dublin, for seven months in 1855, and was afterwards presented by his grandfather, Mr. Heard, to the vicarage of Rincurran. In Rincurran, he established a special class for servants and a chaplaincy to the garrison at Charles Fort. On 11 January 1867 he resigned Rincurran, was for a short time rector of Ballymoney, County Cork, and then became rector of Stackallen, County Meath, and private chaplain to his friend and diocesan, Samuel Butcher. In August 1867 he left Stackallen for the vicarage of St. Matthias, Dublin. His popularity was such that it became necessary to rebuild his church, and while it was being rebuilt he preached in a large concert hall to a congregation that averaged upwards of three thousand people. He preached his final sermon in the concert hall on 31 July 1870, and then took possession of his new church.

As soon as the new constitution of the 'disestablished' church came into action, Daunt was elected to the responsible office of diocesan nominator. He was also chosen the representative canon in St. Patrick's Cathedral for the united diocese of Dublin and Glendalough, and was named a member of the committee connected with the general synod called the 'revision committee', where he sided with the 'party of movement'; but his influence was largely exercised in acting as a peacemaker. The incessant labour in Dublin was now telling on Daunt's health, and his old friend John Gregg, Bishop of Cork, Cloyne and Ross, offered him in 1875 the deanery of Cork and the rectory of Saint Finbarre's Cathedral, which he accepted.

But his health was broken. He died at St. Anne's hydropathic establishment at Blarney on 17 June 1878, and was buried in Mount Jerome Cemetery, Dublin, on 21 June.

He married, 24 February 1863, Katherine Mary, daughter of the Rev. John Leslie, rector of Castlemartyr.

== Works ==
He was the author of a number of books, including:

- The Church. A Lesson-book for Angels, 1872.
- The Person and Offices of the Holy Ghost: Six Donnellan Lectures preached in the Chapel of Trinity College, Dublin, 1879.
- The Morning of Life, and other Gleanings from the manuscripts of the late A. Daunt, 1881.
