= James Hutchinson (priest) =

Rev. Sir James Hutchinson (c.1731–1813) was an Anglican priest in Ireland in the second half of the eighteenth and early nineteenth centuries.

The son of the Right Rev. Doctor Samuel Hutchinson, Bishop of Killala and Achonry, and the great-nephew of the Right Rev. Doctor Francis Hutchinson, author and Bishop of Down and Connor, he was born in County Antrim and educated at Trinity College, Dublin.

He was Archdeacon of Achonry from 1760 until his death on 8 March 1813. He was also a prebendary of Ardagh (1760–1766) and of Killanly (1766–1800) in Killala Cathedral, as well as rector of Killashee and Tashinny from 1770 until his death.

His elder brother, Sir Francis Hutchinson, was created 1st Baronet of Castlesallagh in 1782, to which title James succeeded in 1807. The title next passed to their nephew Samuel Synge.

== Notes ==
Baronetage of Ireland
Preceded by Francis Hutchinson	Baronet (of Castlesallagh); 1807–1813	Succeeded by Samuel Synge-Hutchinson
