= Sir Francis Hutchinson, 1st Baronet =

Sir Francis Hutchinson, 1st Baronet (1726–1807) was an Irish politician, Member of Parliament for Jamestown from 1783 to 1790.

Baronetage of Ireland
New creation	Baronet (of Castlesallagh); 1782–1807	Succeeded by James Hutchinson
