= Marcus Lowther-Crofton =

Anglo-Irish politician (died 1784)

Sir Marcus Lowther-Crofton, 1st Baronet (died 17 January 1784) was an Anglo-Irish politician.

== Biography ==
He was born Marcus Lowther, the son of Gorges Lowther MP, of Kilrue, County Meath, and Jane Beresford, daughter of Sir Tristram Beresford, 3rd Baronet and Nichola Sophia Hamilton. On 9 September 1743 he married Catherine Crofton, daughter of Sir Edward Crofton, 3rd Baronet and Mary Nixon, and in 1745 he legally changed his surname to Lowther-Crofton. They had seven children.

Lowther-Crofton, like his father and his brother Gorges Lowther, represented Ratoath in the Irish House of Commons between 1753 and 1760. On 12 June 1758 he was created a baronet in the Baronetage of Ireland. In 1760 he served as High Sheriff of Roscommon. Lowther-Crofton represented Roscommon from 1761 to 1768, before sitting again for Ratoath between 1769 and 1776.

He was succeeded in his title by his eldest son, Edward Crofton, whose wife, Anne Crofton, was created Baroness Crofton in 1797. His daughter Sophia married the High Court judge Peter Metge; another daughter Catherine married Sir James Quaile Somerville, 3rd Baronet of Somerville, and was the grandmother of the first Baron Athlumney.

== See also ==
- Baron Crofton#Crofton baronets, of the Mote (1758)

Parliament of Ireland
Preceded by Charles Hamilton; Gorges Lowther	Member of Parliament for Ratoath; 1753–1760; With: Gorges Lowther	Succeeded by George Lowther; John Curtis
Preceded by Thomas Mahon; Edward Sandford	Member of Parliament for Roscommon; 1761–1768; With: Sir FitzGerald Aylmer, Bt	Succeeded by Nathaniel Clements; Robert Sandford
Preceded by George Lowther; John Cramer	Member of Parliament for Ratoath; 1769–1776; With: William Irvine	Succeeded by John Forbes; George Putland
Baronetage of Ireland
New creation	Baronet (of the Mote); 1758–1784	Succeeded by Edward Crofton
