= Goold baronets =

Baronetcy in the Baronetage of the United Kingdom

The Goold Baronetcy, of Old Court in the County of Cork, is a title in the Baronetage of the United Kingdom. It was created on 8 August 1801 for Francis Goold, with remainder to the heirs male of his father Henry Michael Goold, who gave valuable service to the government of King George III. The Goold family descends from William Gould, who served as Mayor of Cork during the reign of King Henry VII. His descendant George Gould changed the spelling of the surname to Goold. He was the father of Henry Michael Goold and the grandfather of the first Baronet.

== Goold baronets, of Old Court (1801) ==
Goold baronets
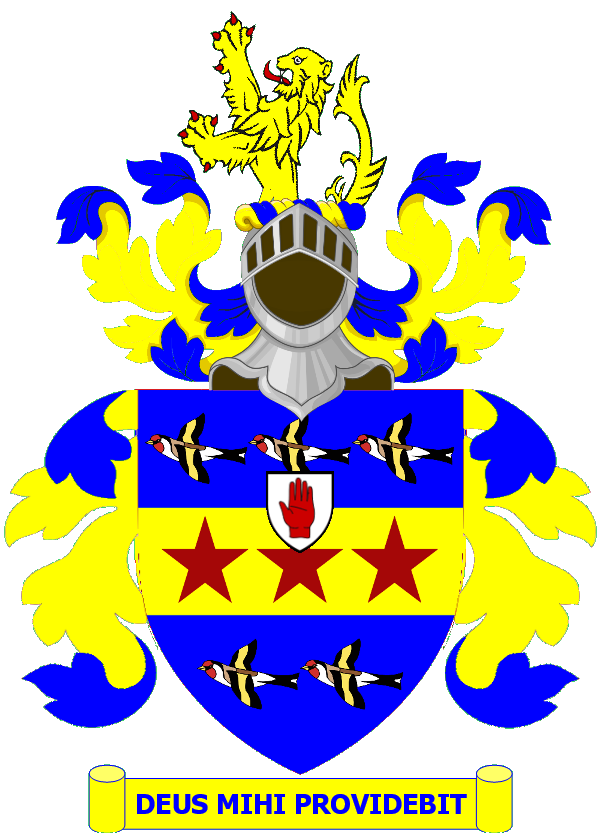
- Crest: A demi-lion rampant Or
- Shield: Azure on a fess Or, between five goldfinches three in chief and two in base Proper, three mullets Gules.
- Motto: Deus Mihi Providebit

- Sir Francis Goold, 1st Baronet (died 1818)
- Sir George Goold, 2nd Baronet (1778–1870)
- Sir Henry Valentine Goold, 3rd Baronet (1803–1893) – president of the Society of Science, Letters and Art, London, 1882–1893
- Sir James Stephen Goold, 4th Baronet (1848–1926)
- Sir George Patrick Goold, 5th Baronet (1878–1954)
- Sir George Ignatius Goold, 6th Baronet (1903–1967)
- Sir George Leonard Goold, 7th Baronet (1923–1997)
- Sir George William Goold, 8th Baronet (born 1950)

The heir apparent to the baronetcy is George Leonard Powell Goold (born 1975), eldest son of the 8th Baronet.

== Notes ==
Baronetage of the United Kingdom
Preceded by Judkin-Fitzgerald baronets	Goold baronets of Old Court; 8 August 1801	Succeeded by Crofton baronets
