= Edward Crofton (cricketer) =

English cricketer

Personal information
- Full name: Edward Hugh Crofton
- Born: 7 September 1854; Plymouth, Devon, England
- Died: 15 May 1882 (aged 27); Kilmainham, Ireland
- Batting: Right-handed
- Bowling: Unknown

Domestic team information
- Years: Team
- 1881: Hampshire

Career statistics
| Competition | First-class |
|---|---|
| Matches | 3 |
| Runs scored | 32 |
| Batting average | 6.40 |
| 100s/50s | –/– |
| Top score | 23 |
| Balls bowled | 84 |
| Wickets | 1 |
| Bowling average | 42.00 |
| 5 wickets in innings | – |
| 10 wickets in match | – |
| Best bowling | 1/21 |
| Catches/stumpings | –/– |
- Source: Cricinfo, 31 December 2009

Edward Hugh Crofton (7 September 1854 – 15 May 1882) was an Anglo-Irish first-class cricketer and British Army officer.

The son of Colonel Hugh Denis Crofton, he was born at Plymouth in September 1854. He later studied at Jesus College at the University of Cambridge, and prior to his matriculation he had been commissioned into the Wiltshire Regiment Militia as a lieutenant in May 1871. He later served in the Rifle Brigade, in which he was promoted to captain in April 1882. As a cricketer, Crofton made his debut in first-class cricket for Hampshire against Sussex at Southampton in 1881. He made two further appearances for Hampshire in 1881, both against the Marylebone Cricket Club at Lord's and Southampton.

Crofton died in Dublin on 15 May 1882, from typhoid fever. He was survived by his wife, who he had married at Christ Church in Folkestone in October 1877. His brother, Morgan, succeeded their uncle as the 4th Baronet of the Crofton Baronets of Mohill in 1867. He later died without issue, with the baronetcy being succeeded in 1900 by Crofton's son, Hugh.
