= Sir Samuel Synge-Hutchinson, 3rd Baronet =

Irish Anglican priest (1756–1846)

Sir Samuel Synge-Hutchinson, 3rd Baronet (22 April 1756 – 1 March 1846) was a 19th-century Anglican priest in Ireland.

He was educated at Trinity College, Dublin; and was Archdeacon of Killaloe from 1785 when he succeeded his father until his own resignation in 1809.

Sir Samuel (who lived on Hardcourt St.) gave land off Hatch Street, on which St. Matthias' Church was built.

Baronetage of Ireland
Preceded by James Hutchinson	Baronet (of Castlesallagh); 1813–1846	Succeeded by Edward Synge-Hutchinson
