= St. Matthias' Church, Dublin =

Former protestant church in Dublin, Ireland (1842–1958)

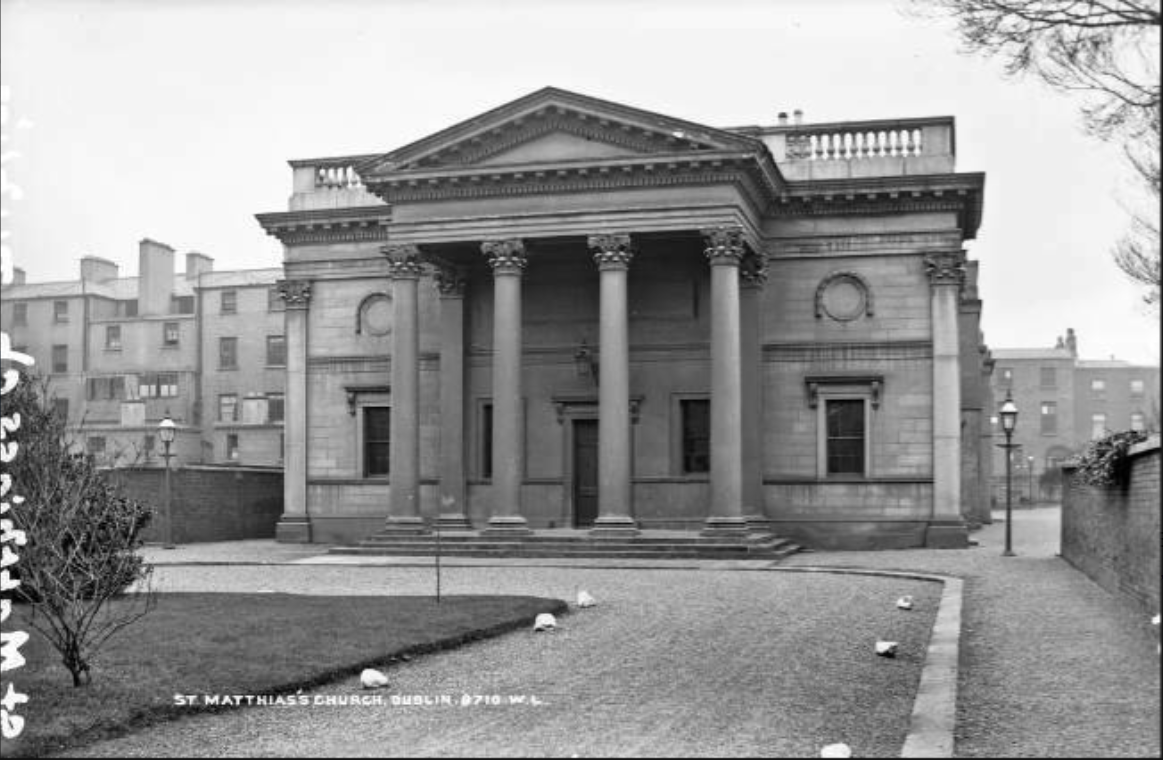
St Matthias's Church, Hatch Street.

St. Matthias's Church was a Church of Ireland church located on Hatch Street in Dublin. It was established in 1842 by Rev. Maurice Day (who later became Bishop of Cashel and Waterford). Rev. Day served in St. Matthias's until 1868. The church was a Proprietary Church funded by lay people, administered by a group of trustees, and used as a chapel of ease. The Church was designed by the architect Daniel Robertson. The foundation stone was laid by the Archbishop of Dublin Richard Whately on February 24, 1842. The land was given to the church by Rev. Sir Samuel Synge-Hutchinson, 3rd Baronet who lived on nearby Harcourt Street.

The Church was originally intended to be part of a development called Wellington Square, which was never built. The adjacent land was sold to the Dublin, Wicklow and Wexford Railway (DW&WR) company for the development of Harcourt Street station, with the railway line opening in 1859.

St. Matthias’s Parish would have included, Earlsfort Terrace, Hatch Street, Adelaide Road, Harcourt Street and Terrace, as well as part of the South Circular Road. Following the Church's closure, the parish was merged with the parish of St. Audoen. From 1970, the parishes of St Peter; St Matthias and St Audoen; St. Catherine and James Church; St Luke and St Kevin came under St. Patrick's Cathedral, until 2010.

The preacher Rev. Achilles Daunt was a curate in 1855. The playwright, folklorist, and co-founder of the Abbey Theatre, Lady Gregory was married in 1880 in St. Matthias'. The Rev. George Nowlan served as rector from 1935 to 1939. Due to a lack of parishioners the last service was held and the church closed in 1956. At a final service on Sunday, 25 March 1956 to mark the closure, parishioners expressed their anger at the closure of the Church. The Church was demolished in 1958, and offices were built on the site.

The war memorial from the Church was restored and relocated to St. Audoen's Church in Cornmarket.
