= Clayton-East baronets of Hall Place (1838) =

Escutcheon of the Clayton-East baronets of Hall Place (Foster)

Escutcheon of the Clayton-East baronets of Hall Place (Burke, General Armory, East quartering Clayton)

The Clayton-East, later Gilbert-East, later Clayton-East-Clayton baronetcy, of Hall Place in the County of Berkshire, was created in the Baronetage of the United Kingdom on 17 August 1838 for East Clayton-East. Born East Clayton, he was the second son of the 4th Baronet of the Clayton baronets of Marden Park (1732) and his wife Mary East, daughter of Sir William East, 1st Baronet, of Hall Place, a title which had become extinct on the death in 1828 of the 2nd Baronet. East Clayton succeeded to the East estates on the death of his uncle in 1828, and assumed the following year the additional surname of East. In 1838, the baronetcy of Hall Place was revived in his favour. He was succeeded by his eldest son, the 2nd Baronet. In 1839 he assumed for his lifetime only by royal licence the surname of Gilbert-East in lieu of Clayton-East. On his death the title passed to his son, the 3rd Baronet. In 1914 Sir Gilbert Augustus Clayton-East, 3rd Baronet succeeded to the baronetcy of Marden Park.

== Clayton-East, Gilbert-East, Clayton-East-Clayton baronets, of Hall Place, Maidenhead (1838) ==
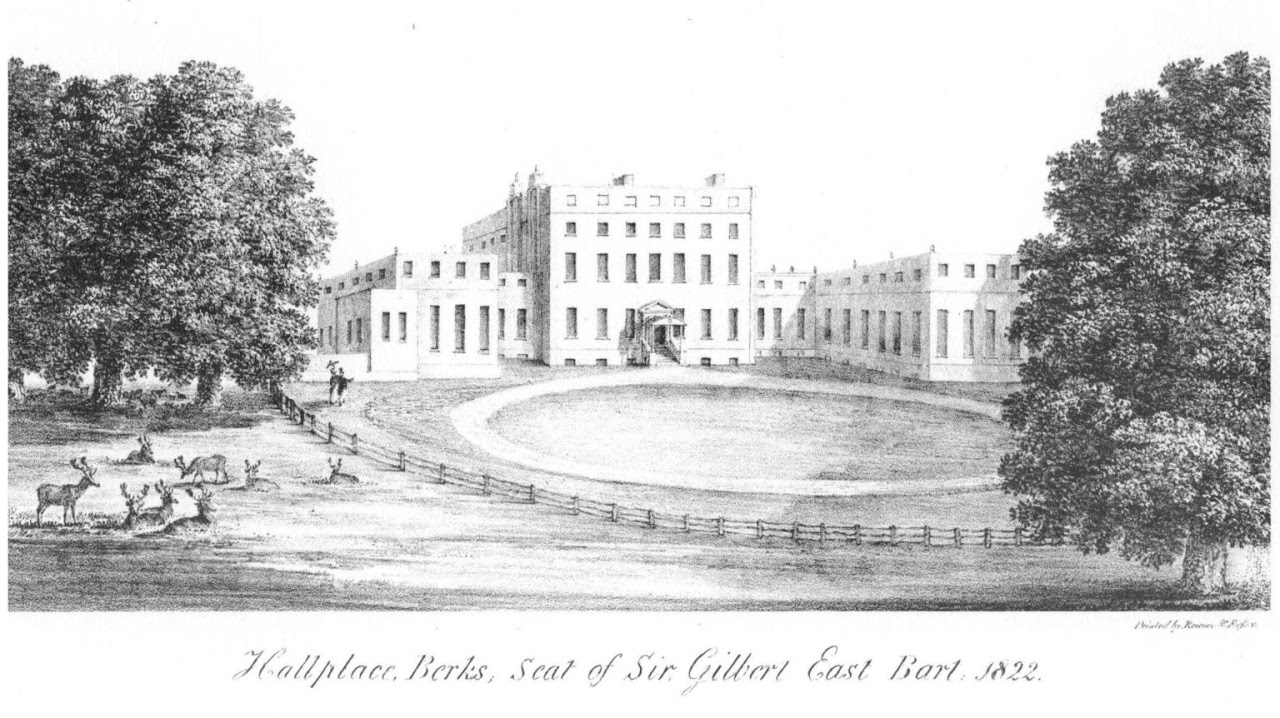
Hall Place, Berkshire, 1822 engraving

- Sir East George Clayton-East, 1st Baronet (1794–1851)
- Sir Gilbert East Gilbert-East, 2nd Baronet (1823–1866)
- Sir Gilbert Augustus Clayton-East, 3rd Baronet (1846–1925)
- Sir George Frederick Lancelot Clayton-East, 4th Baronet of Hall Place, Maidenhead (1872–1926)
- Sir Robert Alan Clayton East-Clayton, 5th Baronet of Hall Place, Maidenhead (1908–1932). His heir inherited only the Marden baronetcy, the Hall Place baronetcy becoming extinct on his death.

The seat Hall Place, Maidenhead, was sold in 1948. As of 2026, Berkshire College of Agriculture owns the house and farms the estate.

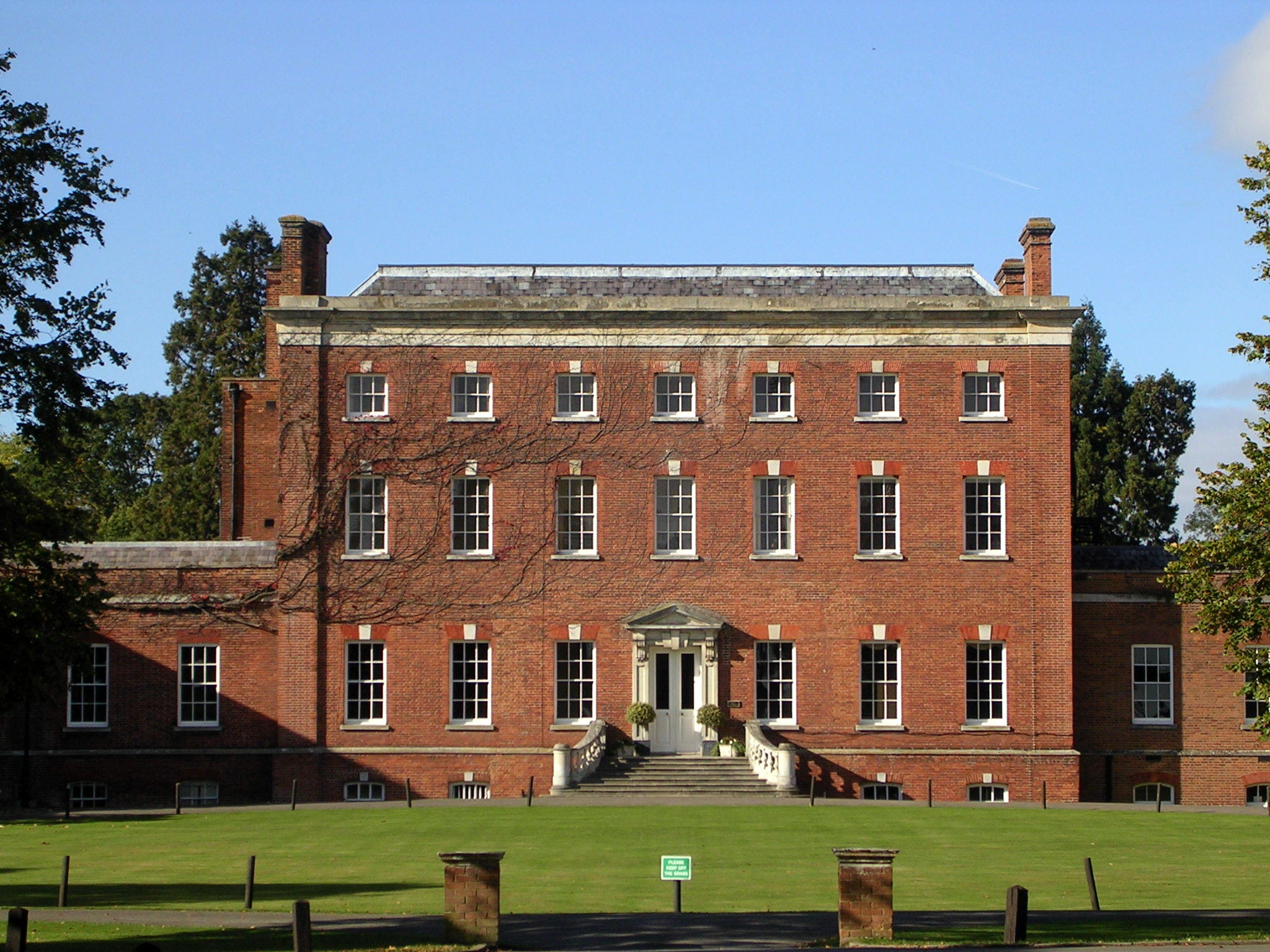
Hall Place, 2010 photograph

== In literature ==
The 5th Baronet and his wife Dorothy were the basis for the characters of Geoffrey and Katharine Clifton in the novel The English Patient.

== Notes ==
Baronetage of the United Kingdom
Preceded by Hall baronets	Clayton-East baronets of Hall Place; 17 August 1838	Succeeded by Crofton baronets
