= Gorges Lowther (1769–1854) =

Irish Member of Parliament

Gorges Lowther (1768 – 23 February 1854) was an Irish Member of Parliament.

He represented Ratoath in the Irish House of Commons from 1790 to 1798.

He was the son of George Lowther of Kilrue, County Meath, by his wife Frances, daughter of Chambré Brabazon Ponsonby.

Parliament of Ireland
Preceded by Alexander Hamilton; John Metge	Member of Parliament for Ratoath; 1790–1798; With: William Irvine January–September 1798; James Moore O'Donnell from September 1798	Succeeded by James Moore O'Donnell; James Cane
