= Ratoath (Parliament of Ireland constituency) =

Pre-1801 Irish constituency

- Former borough constituency for the Irish House of Commons
- County: County Meath
- Borough: Ratoath

–1801
- Replaced by: Disfranchised

Ratoath was a constituency represented in the Irish House of Commons.

== Borough ==
This constituency was the manor of Ratoath in County Meath.

Following the Acts of Union 1800 the constituency was disenfranchised.

== Members of Parliament ==
It returned two members to the Parliament of Ireland to 1800.

- 1661-1666 Richard Boughton (expelled for absence and replaced by Sir Robert Reading) and Dr Ralph King

=== 1689–1801 ===
Election	First MP	Second MP
1689	John Hussey	James FitzGerald
1692	Edward Corker	Robert Gorges
1695	Edward Corker	Thomas Molyneux
September 1703	Edward Forde	Richard Gorges
1703	Edward Forde	Sir Standish Hartstonge, 2nd Bt
1705	George Lowther	Sir Standish Hartstonge, 2nd Bt
1713	George Lowther	Richard Gorges
1716	Hon. William St Lawrence	Richard Gorges
1727	Charles Hamilton	Edward Lovett Pearce
1734	Charles Hamilton	Rowley Hill
1737	Charles Hamilton	Gorges Lowther
1753	Marcus Lowther-Crofton	Gorges Lowther
1761	George Lowther	John Curtis
1768	George Lowther	John Cramer
1769	William Irvine	Sir Marcus Lowther-Crofton, 1st Bt
1776	John Forbes	George Putland
1783	Peter Metge	Arthur Forbes
1784	John Metge	Arthur Forbes
1789	John Metge	Alexander Hamilton
1790	William Irvine	Gorges Lowther
January 1798	James Moore O'Donnell	Gorges Lowther
September 1798	James Moore O'Donnell	James Cane
1801	Constituency disenfranchised	

== See also ==
- List of Irish constituencies
