= Guy Crofton, 7th Baron Crofton =

Lieutenant-Colonel Guy Patrick Gilbert Crofton, 7th Baron Crofton (17 June 1951 – 25 November 2007) was a member of the Peerage of Ireland and British Army officer. He was commissioned into the 9th/12th Royal Lancers and served as a lieutenant-colonel and defence attaché to the British Embassy in Angola. He died, of leukaemia, in November 2007 aged 56.

Peerage of Ireland
Preceded by Charles Crofton	Baron Crofton; 1989–2007	Succeeded by Edward Crofton
