= Sir Edward Crofton, 1st Baronet =

Anglo-Irish politician

Sir Edward Crofton, 1st Baronet (1624–1675) was an Anglo-Irish Royalist politician.

== Family ==
Crofton was the son of George Crofton of Ballymurray, County Roscommon and Elizabeth Berkeley, daughter of Sir Francis Berkeley and Catherine Loftus, and granddaughter of Adam Loftus, Archbishop of Armagh. The Crofton family had come to Ireland in the sixteenth century and settled in County Roscommon. His father sat in the Irish House of Commons as MP for Askeaton in the Irish Parliament of 1639. At about the same time he began the building of Mote Park House, which Edward inherited, and remained the family seat for generations.

== Education ==
Crofton entered Trinity College, Dublin on 15 February 1640.

== Created 1st Baronet ==
On 1 July 1661 he was created a baronet in the Baronetage of Ireland as a reward for his support of Charles II of England during the English Civil War and The Restoration. In 1661 he represented Lanesborough in the Irish House of Commons.

== Marriages ==
=== First marriage ===
He married firstly in 1647 Mary, daughter of the eminent historian Sir James Ware and his wife Elizabeth Newman, daughter of John Newman of Dublin. She died without issue in 1651.

=== Second marriage ===
He married secondly in 1661 Susanna, daughter of Thomas Clifford of Devon, by whom he had an only son and heir, Edward.

==== Widow's re-marriage ====
After his death, his widow remarried the prominent barrister Garrett Dillon. She died before 1689.

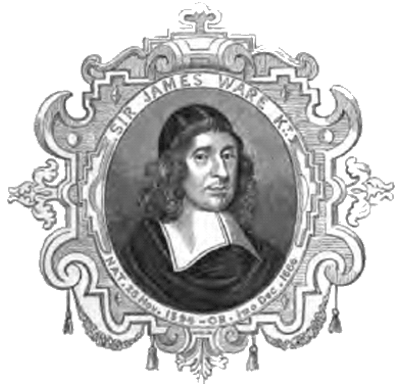
Sir James Ware, the eminent historian and father of Crofton's first wife Mary

Baronetage of Ireland
New creation	Baronet (of the Mote); 1661–1675	Succeeded by Edward Crofton
