= Edward Synge (priest) =

18th-century Irish Anglican priest

Edward Synge (1726–1792) was an Anglican priest in Ireland.

He was educated at Trinity College, Dublin. A prebendary of Lackeen in Killaloe Cathedral, Synge was Archdeacon of Killaloe from 1761 until his own resignation in 1785 when he was succeeded by his son Samuel.
