= Society of Science, Letters and Art =

Learned society (1882–1902)

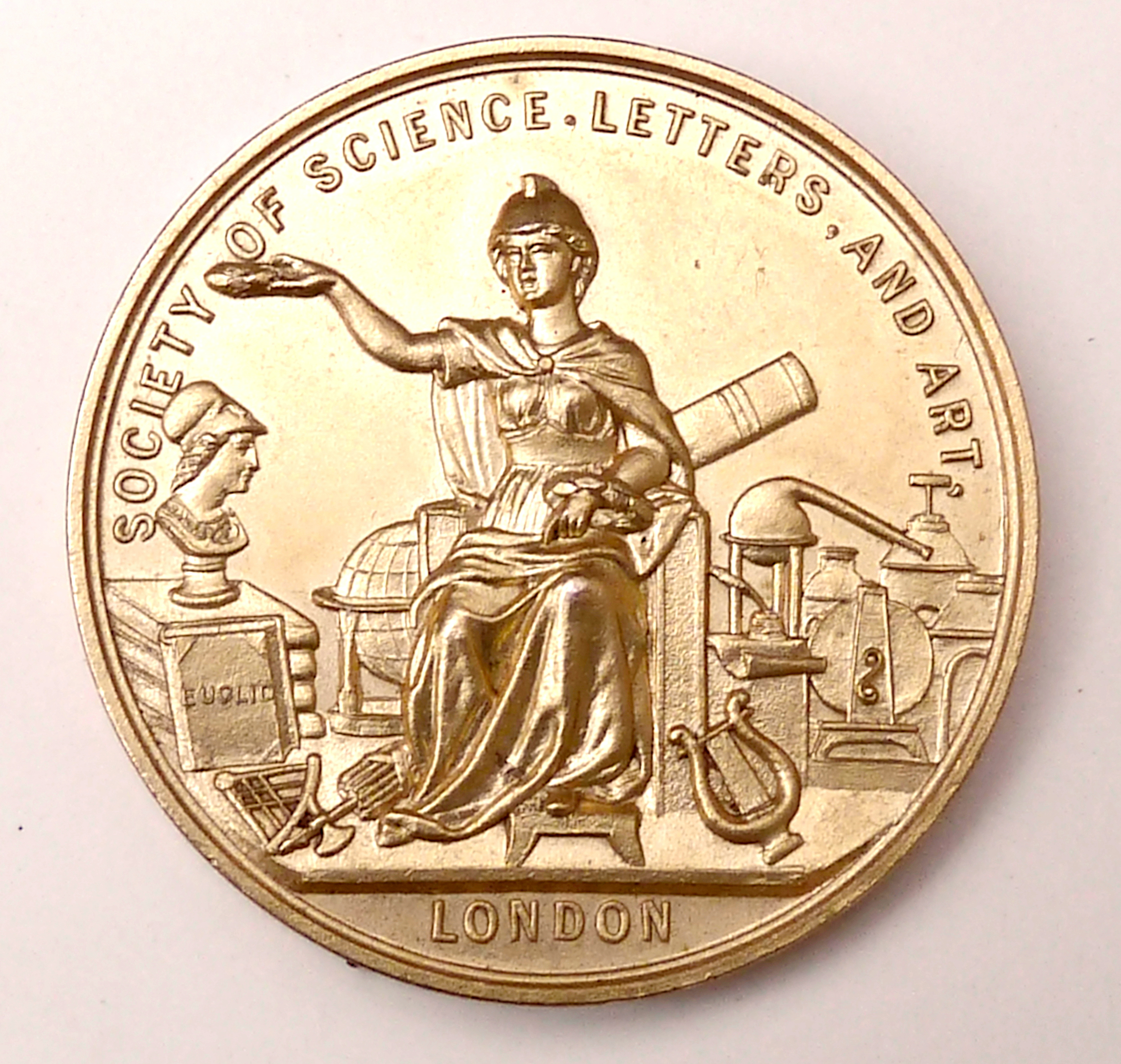
- Gold medallion and Society emblem: Athena with attributes of science, letters and art
- Founders: Dr Edward Albert Sturman, M.A., F.R.S.L.
- Established: 1882
- President: Sir Henry Valentine Goold
- Chair: Sir Henry Valentine Goold (1882–1893)
- Members: 1,500 (1892)
- Owner: Dr Edward Albert Sturman, M.A., F.R.S.L.
- Location: Addison House, 160 Holland Road, Kensington, London (demolished), England
- Dissolved: after 1902

The Society of Science, Letters and Art, also known as the Society of Science or SSLA, was a soi-disant learned society which flourished between 1882 and 1902. Dr Edward Albert Sturman, M.A., F.R.S.L., owned and ran the Society for his own financial benefit from his house at Holland Road in Kensington, London. He took the title of Hon. Secretary and worked under the name of the Irish baronet Sir Henry Valentine Goold. Goold was given the title of president and chairman, which he held until his death in 1893.

The Society sold the privilege of wearing academic dress and of using the postnominal letters F.S.Sc., to both eminent and ordinary people around the world, without the obligation to sit an examination or to submit papers. Many members of legitimate learned societies were duped into thinking that they were being offered fellowships by a department of their own respected institution. The Society also sold diplomas and masqueraded as an examination board for schools, although it merely provided exam papers and did not examine candidates. In 1883 Sir Henry Trueman Wood accused the Society of Science, Letters and Art of needing the "borrowed light" of the Royal Society of Arts, after the SSLA sold its own Fellowships to members of the RSA, allowing them to assume that the offer was supported by the RSA. After an 1892 exposure of the Society in the investigative journal Truth, The Evening Post in Auckland said the SSLA was "a bogus literary society."

== Aims and structure ==
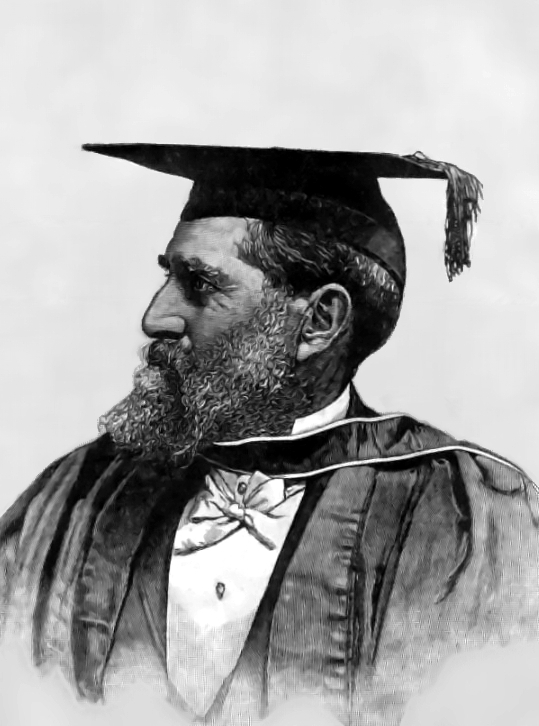
C. Frusher Howard F.S.Sc. in SSLA cap and gown: former embezzler, and apologist for the Society

The Society appears to have been active from 1882 or 1883. Its laws, dated 10 November 1885, said that the Society was entitled to charge a fee, and that the members may not retain any of the Society's money, but were entitled to use the letters F.S.Sc. after their name, and to pay for the privilege. To use these letters, a member did not have to pass an examination or achieve anything in the disciplines of science or art. The society's aims, according to the 1884 prospectus, were to promote science, literature and art and to encourage its Fellows "to form scientific, literary and musical circles of the Society throughout the world." Membership was limited to 1,000 Foundation Fellows who paid half price, and any number of Ordinary Fellows and Members, who paid full price. For a Foundation Fellow, annual subscription was one guinea and life subscription cost five guineas. The Society's apologist, the former embezzler Joseph Ostler alias C. Frusher Howard, described it as follows, in a letter dated December 1893:

"Its affairs are managed by a president, several vice-presidents, a numerous Council and two paid secretaries; its fellows and members are university graduates, Fellows of learned societies, authors, and others eminent in science, literature and art. It holds periodical meetings for lectures etc., for the reading of original and interesting papers, for the promotion of new works, discoveries and inventions, and for the diffusion of useful knowledge; it also publishes a quarterly journal of its transactions."

=== Journal ===
The image of the Latin seal on the Society's certificate presented to members is dated MDCCCLXXXI, or 1881. Its Chairman, Sir H.V. Goold, stated in 1884 that the Society had been "established for some years." There are records of fellowships being granted by the Society from 1883. However the earliest known Journal was published on 10 November 1884, and gives the Society's address as Addison House, 160 Holland Road, near Addison Road Station, Kensington, West London. It functions as a prospectus for the Society, and sets out its aims and aspirations. It contains a list of its honourable representatives, its officers and its council; a list of "scientific, literary, & musical circles about to be formed;" the conditions and privileges of fellowship. It also contains an "application for admission as Fellow of the Society," with name left blank to be filled in, and pre-stamped with the chairman's facsimile signature of acceptance, and a "Formal certificate of a candidate for admission as Fellow," for recommendation, similarly pre-stamped. The prospectus was followed in 1885 by a printed programme of exhibitions in the sciences and arts.

=== Papers and addresses ===
One of the academic papers published in 1884 by the Society was Some notes on the stage and its influences on the education of the masses, players and playgoers etc., by Henry Blau. Another of these papers was The ideographic ornamentation of Gothic buildings written in 1902 by the artist and antiquarian Thomas Tindall Wildridge. This article was informed by his book, The Grotesque in Church Art.

In 1897 the Society sent an Address to Queen Victoria on the occasion of her Diamond Jubilee.

== Officers ==
=== Sir Henry Valentine Goold, baronet ===
The chairman and president of the society from 1882 to 1893 was the impecunious and propertyless Irish baronet Sir Henry Valentine Goold (1803–1893), the third of the Goold baronets of Oldcourt House, Cork. He was born on 7 July 1803 in Baker Street, Marylebone, and died in Croydon on 18 June 1893, age 89. (Note: Gould was the ninth child of Sir George Goold, 2nd baronet, and Lady Charlotte Browne, daughter of Valentine Browne, 1st Earl of Kenmare and Hon. Charlotte Dillon) The family motto was Deus mihi providebit, or "God will provide". A grandson of the 3rd Goold baronet, and nephew of Sir Henry Valentine Goold, was Vere St. Leger Goold, a tennis player and criminal who was incarcerated on Devil's Island and died there.

Goold served on Cork County Grand Jury in 1842. He was Deputy Lieutenant for Cork but resigned the position in 1862. He wrote The Single Serpentine Course of the Moon Round the Sun and the Earth (A. Boot & Son, 1883). In July 1874, he sold off 650 acres of his estate, in the Landed Estates Court. In 1878 he was involved in a Court dispute with Holmwood, Row and Company.

Notwithstanding any position or duties retained in Cork, by the time he died Goold had lived in West Croydon for many years. The 1861 Census shows a married gentleman born in Marylebone called Henry Goold living in Pier Road, North Aylesford, Kent, with his wife Sarah, aged 35. He appears unmistakably on the Census only once: in 1881, living at 8 Canterbury Road, Croydon with a fifteen-year-old servant, Jane Smith. He is 77 years old, described as a married baronet and as a property and landowner. In April 1893, he was summoned before the County Court judge at Croydon to answer for an unpaid debt accrued by himself, but the judge declined to commit him to jail due to his advanced age. The York Herald made its own judgement, saying, "If he is considered too old to be made to pay his debts, many people will think he is also too old to be in a position to incur any." Goold did not marry. His heir was his nephew, the 4th Baronet Sir James Stephen Goold, who inherited only the title, emigrated to Australia, and worked anonymously for a railway company as a "permanent way man", or railway line maintenance man.

=== Successors ===
Goold died in 1893, and was succeeded as president by James S. Forsyth, D.D. until at least 1894. Robert Palmer, M.A. was the Hon. Secretary in 1894.

=== Secretaries ===
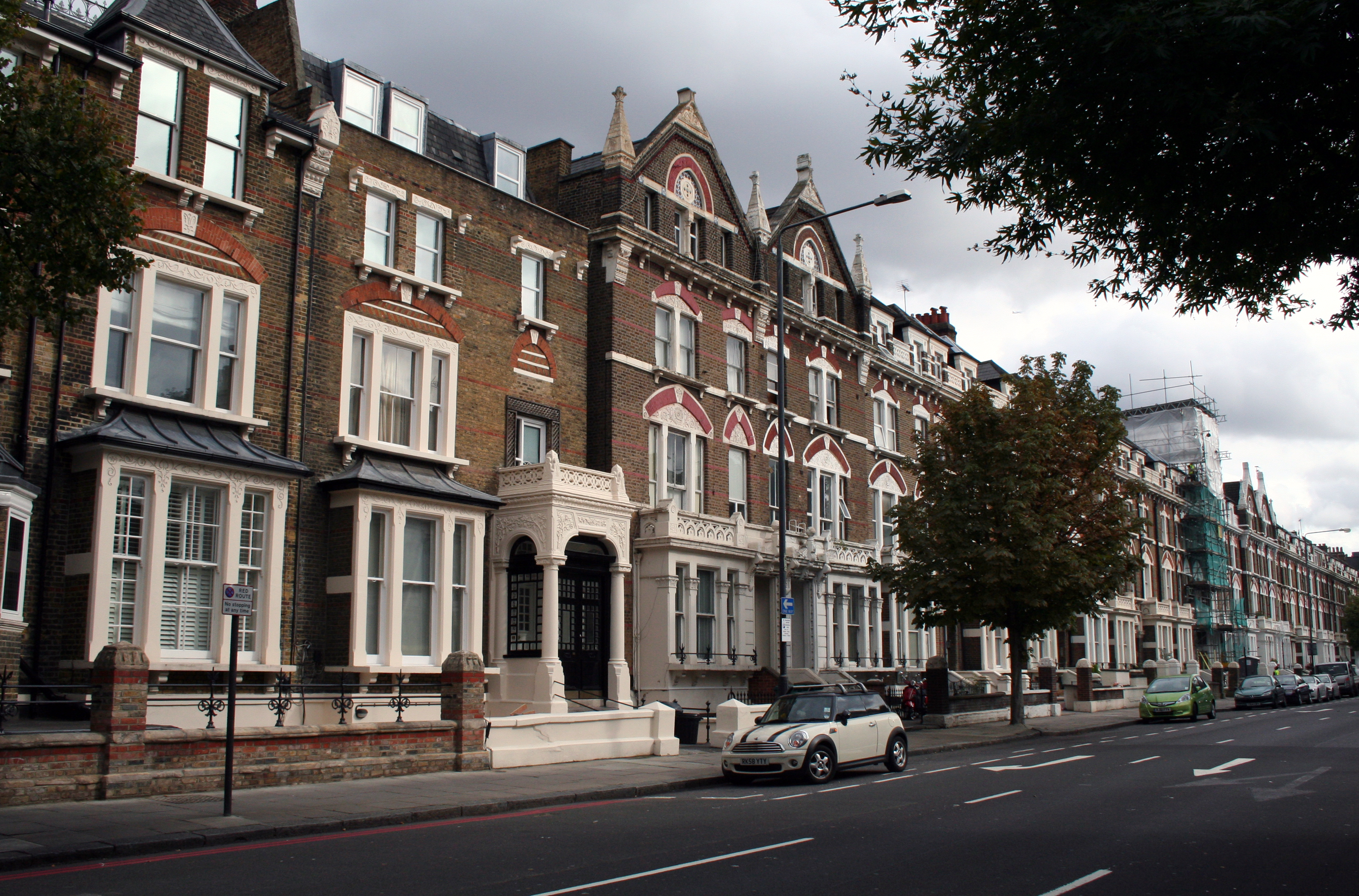
Holland Road houses similar to the Society's headquarters (No.160 was demolished)

The Hon. Secretary was Dr Edward Albert Sturman, M.A., FRSL (1840–1899), and his wife was Lady Secretary. Sturman and his wife owned the Holland Road premises and the Society, and accepted all its profits, using Goold's name and rank as bait to impress and convince new paying members.

Sturman's father was George Sturman, a gun-maker born in Tower Hamlets, Middlesex in 1800. His mother Sarah was born in 1804 in Bethnal Green, and Sturman was born in Hoxton. The 1841 census finds Sturman, at six months the youngest of eight children, living with his parents at 25 East Road in Tower Hamlets, Shoreditch, in the parish of St Leonard. In 1851 they were occupying a house at 2 Church Row, Upper Street, in St Mary's, Islington. By 1861 the family had moved a couple of doors along, to a room in number 4a Church Row, which was fairly crowded with artisan tenants. Sturman was by then aged 20 and a schoolmaster, still unmarried and living with his parents.

In 1864 Sturman married Emma Jessup (or Webb) (1846–1918) when he was 23 and she was 18 years old. They had nine children, of whom one died young. By 1871 Sturman was aged 30, still a schoolmaster and married to Emma aged 25, a schoolmistress born in Hackney, Whitechapel, Stepney or Mile End. They had two children aged six and five years, and were living at 145 Packington Street, then a ladies' school, at St Peter's, Islington. By 1881 there were eight children aged two to sixteen, of which the eldest was a civil servant clerk, and Sturman was still schoolmastering, although they had moved out of the school and were living at 68 Upper Tollington Park, Hornsey. They had moved around somewhat, as the three youngest of the children had been born in Penge, Sydenham, and Lee Place in Lewisham. By 1891 the family had two servants, and most of them (less two children) were living at 160 Holland Road, South Kensington. Sturman was now Hon. Secretary of the Society and Emma was Lady Secretary. Their daughter Florence was a dead letter office clerk - a post which might have been useful at a Society which practised a form of pamphleting and received a great deal of returned mail. The other children were all clerks, except the youngest who was an apprentice electrical engineer. In 1899, Sturman died.

The 1901 Census finds Emma Sturman as a widow still living with her family at 160 Holland Road. She owned the house, and was selling apartments within it. Her family appears to have been educated, stable and respectably employed. Her youngest son, Douglas, had become an electrical engineer and telephone company worker. Another son was now a civil servant and principal clerk and he had married a woman from Cape Colony. By 1911, Emma at age 65 was still living at Holland Road with three spinster daughters, two female boarders and a female servant. She and her daughter Lucy Minnie were working from their nine-room house as secretary and clerk for their own private company, the nature of which is unknown.

=== Other officers ===
In 1884 to 1885, the vice-chairman was Sir William Robert Clayton, 6th of the Clayton baronets.

== People associated with the SSLA ==
=== Fellows ===
Fellows fell into three groups, and all were entitled to append the letters F.S.Sc. after their names, and wear a cap and gown. The first set were eminent scientists and artists who deserved fellowship of a learned society and there were few of these. The second group already belonged to respected learned societies, such as the Royal Society of Arts, and had been leafleted by the SSLA, paid their guineas, then in at least some cases realised that the sale of fellowships was not condoned by their own respected society. The third group were people who simply engaged in science and art; some took an examination and some paid for their fellowship. A fellow proposed by the council would receive a diploma written in Latin. The fellow was permitted special insignia of which the price to the wearer is unknown, and which was described as "a very handsome gold cross surrounded by a laurel wreath and having appropriate emblems in the centre."

==== Eminent Fellows and those affiliated with legitimate societies ====
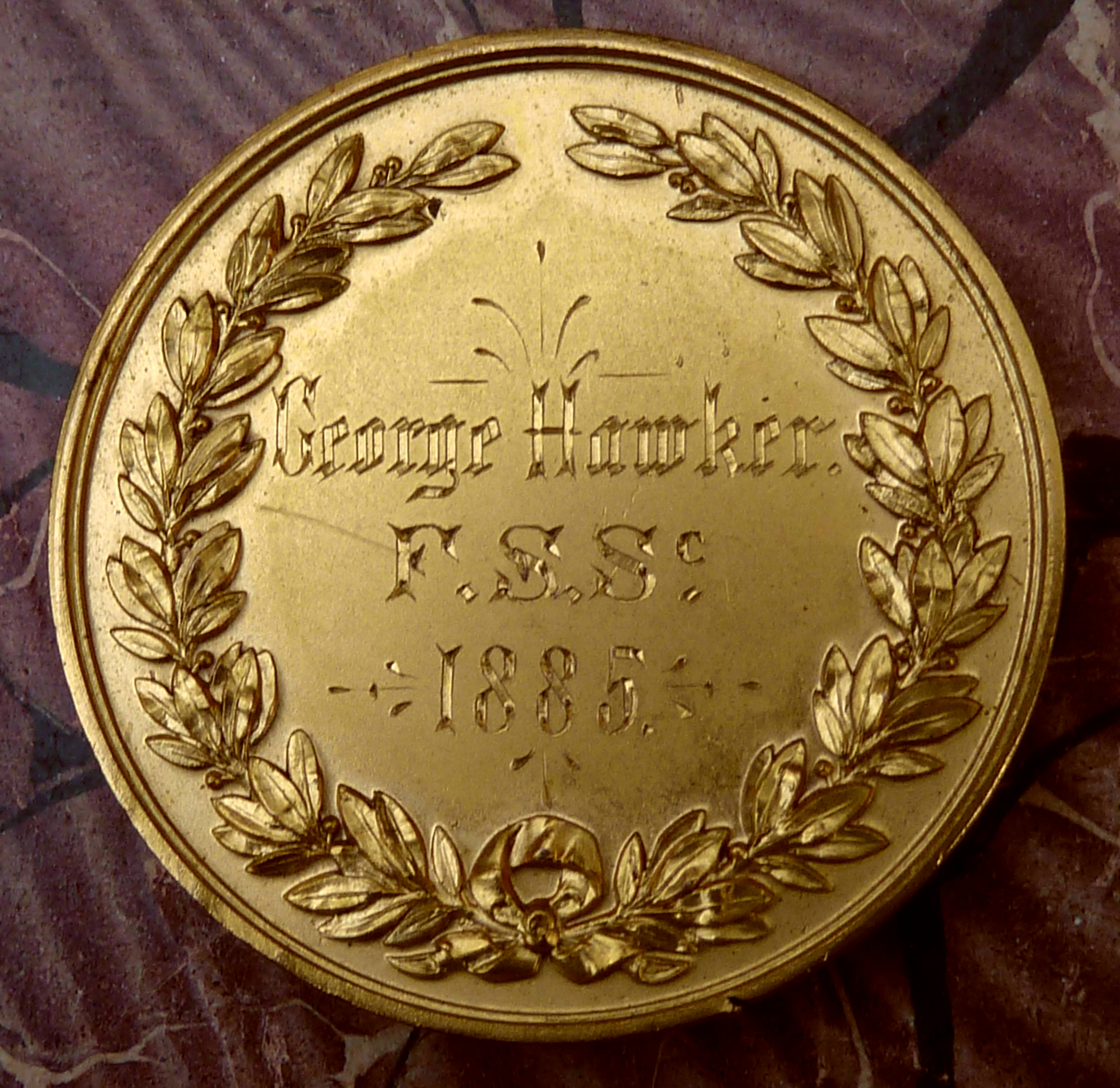
Gold medallion awarded to George Hawker, 1885

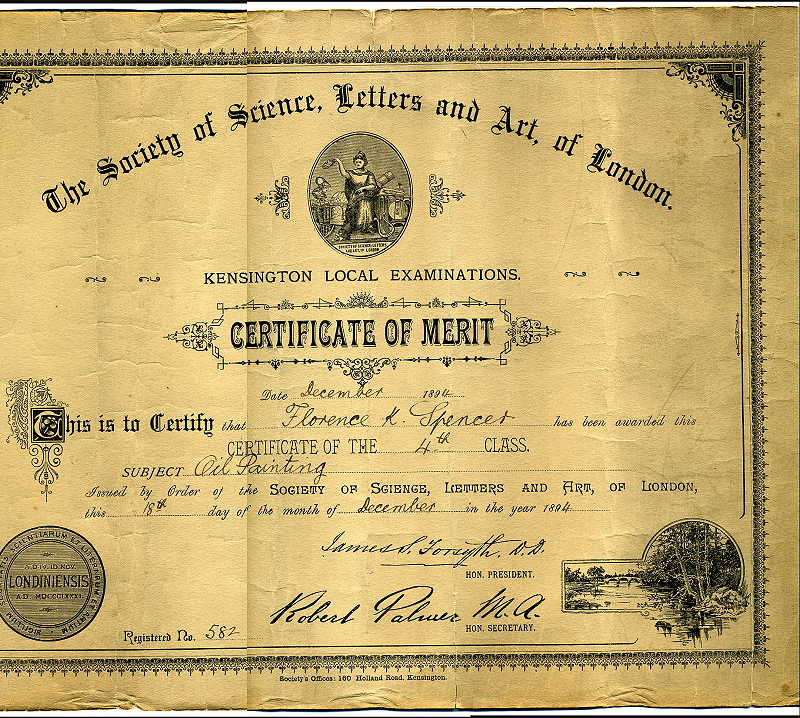
Certificate awarded to Florence K. Spencer, 1894

Johann Gottlieb Otto Tepper (1841–1923), Hon. Fellow of the Royal Society of South Australia and Fellow of the Linnean Society of London, was a botanist, schoolteacher and entomologist who was a life member of the SSLA and received its medallion in 1898. American physician, surgeon, and gynaecologist Newsom Jones Pittman (1818–1893) was vice president of the North Carolina Medical Society and of the American Medical Association, besides being a Master Mason. Charles Farrar Forster (1848–1894) was a Fellow of the Royal Geographical Society, and first vicar of the Church of St Michael and All Angels, Beckwithshaw, North Yorkshire, England. Mr O'Donovan, FRGS, was the Parliamentary Librarian of Queensland; the Society posted his Latin diploma of Fellowship to him in 1885. Mr Fremersdorf, FRGS, of East Bourke, Victoria, Australia, was appointed Honorary Representative to Washington Territory for the SSLA in 1885.

==== Fellows engaged in the sciences and arts ====
The Reverend John Botheras was principal of Stafford school, and wrote sermons and articles for Bible, Christian Magazine. Sarah Hutchins Killikelly (1840–1912) was a school teacher who wrote two books: Curious Questions in History, Literature, Art, and Social Life Designed as a Manual of General Information, vols I-III (1886–1900), and The History of Pittsburgh, Its Rise and Progress (Pittsburgh, Gordon Montgomery, 1906). She received an SSLA gold medallion in 1897 for her historical papers. Oliver McEwan was the principal of the New Metropolitan School of Shorthand in High Holborn in 1883; in the same year he wrote Shorthand: helps to the study of phonography. Mrs Stocken was principal of South London College in 1888. Monsieur Stirn, B.A. was director of the Anglo-French College, Kettering in 1884. Dr Spark was the Leeds borough organist, and he received a diploma from the Society in 1883.

=== Members awarded SSLA medallions and certificates ===
Besides those school children who did exceptionally well in examinations, there were Members other than Fellows who were not engaged in science or art, but who were interested in those matters. They could submit examples of their work for examination in the hope of winning a silver or gold medallion of the SSLA. A fortunate member might receive a silver-plated bronze or gilt-bronze medallion, cast with a figure of Athena, goddess of wisdom and learning, dispensing laurel wreaths and surrounded by her scientific and artistic attributes (pictured above). On the reverse the name of recipient and date of award would be engraved within a laurel wreath. George Hawker's gilt-bronze medallion weighs approximately 24 grams and is a professional and clean casting. These medallions were not, however, cast by the Royal Mint.

Miss E.A. Wright was awarded a silver medal for her oil painting in 1892. Florence K. Spencer received a 4th class certificate for her oil painting on 18 December 1894 (pictured right). George Hawker won a gold medallion in 1885 for an unknown work (pictured right). This could possibly be George Charles Hawker, the Australian politician. At an unknown date, J.P. Thompson of Brisbane was awarded a silver medallion for "merit in science."

== School examinations ==
The society provided school examinations such as arithmetic, geography, history, grammar, drawing, Latin, French, algebra and bookkeeping. In early 1885, Henry Valentine Goold presented the prizes at St John's College, Grimsargh, Preston, Lancashire, where the boys had taken the Society's exams and the principal, Reverend T. Abbott Peters, M.A., was a Fellow of the Society. In 1886 at the Convent of Jesus and Mary, Ipswich, all eighteen pupils who took examinations passed with honour certificates or honours in individual subjects, such as French, music, botany, bookkeeping, English, German and drawing. In 1887, nineteen out of the twenty candidates at St. Joseph's College, Weston Hall, Rugby passed the exam and received the Society's certificate. In the same year at the Ursuline Convent, Upton, Essex, most pupils took the Society's exams. Many candidates obtained maximum marks, some earned Honours, and one candidate Miss Winifred Wilson received a silver medallion. In 1890 at St Rose's Convent School, Stroud, its female pupils took part in a competition and exhibition of work which was posted to the Society's Kensington base. Two girls obtained certificates with honours for their oil paintings: E. Hanman and Nellie Mackey. Mary Culler won the same for her map drawing. The pupils took the Society's exams in nine subjects, including scripture, grammar, freehand and model drawing, French, theory of music, history and literature, with Hanman and Mackey winning Honours while Gertie McKay aged 12 received a certificate too. In 1891, the Society was cited as the exam board for Euston College, England, in its prospectus.

Notwithstanding the above information from the schools via the respectable Press, the Society's Hon. Secretary Dr Thurman admitted in 1892 that he only sent out exam papers and did not examine candidates; he accepted that this was "a little bit wrong." He said the Society "examined some 50 schools a year, charging a fee from 2s 6d to 7s 6d per head for each pupil, but sometimes quoting wholesale rates and giving certificates." It may be significant that the Press only records each school using the Society as exam board once.

== Criticism of the Society ==
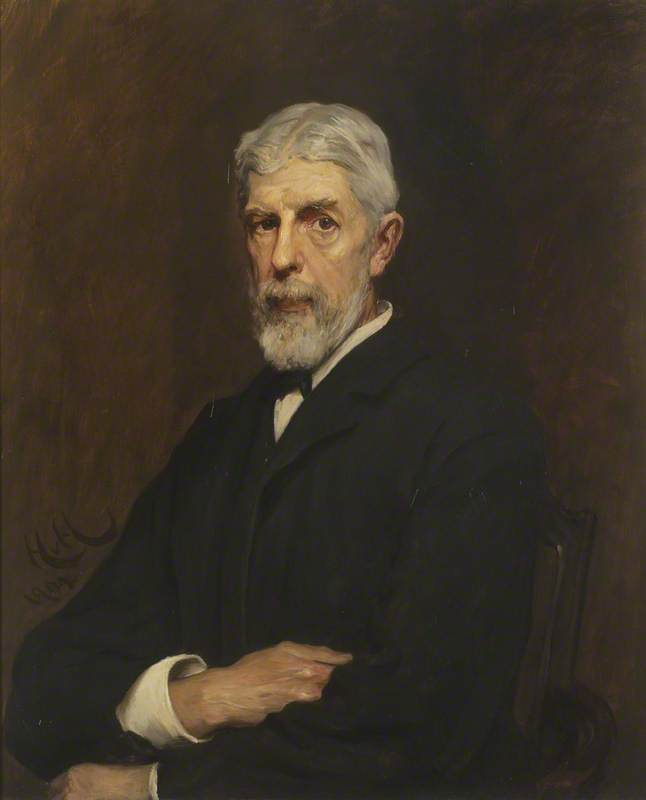
Sir Henry Trueman Wood, critic of the Society

On 23 February 1883, Sir Henry Trueman Wood, Secretary of the Royal Society of Arts, sent a letter to The Times, complaining that the SSLA was using a title too much like its own, and that it had been asking the RSA's members to sign up to the Society of Science, Letters and Art while giving the impression that the RSA had commissioned this request. It added that some of its members had paid to join the SSLA, and when they realised their mistake and asked for a refund, no refund was forthcoming.

In October 1886, the Society received strong criticism from New Zealand. The complaint was that "the society's favours (i.e. the offering of scientific fellowships) appear to be sown broadcast." The complaint was prompted by the following note, sent speculatively from London to likely candidates in the Colonies by the Society.

"We shall be pleased to add your name to the list of Fellows of the Society of Science, Letters and Art, of London. We are admitting the principal men of science, letters and art from all parts of the world. With Sir H.V. Goold's compliments."^{Auckland Star, 18 October 1886}

It was understood that the Society's practice was to send out, along with the above note and the SSLA Journal, a proposal of fellowship already stamped with the acceptance of Goold himself, and with the recipient's name left blank. The Journal stated that in return for an annual subscription of one guinea or a single life membership costing five guineas, 1,000 Foundation Fellowships were not only offered to eminent scientists, but also to anyone merely "engaged in science, literature or art, including music and the fine arts; also to those who are most active in promoting the interests and objects of the society." After the first 1,000 places were filled, an unlimited number of remaining applicants were to be called Ordinary Fellows, and were to pay double the fees. In return for their guineas and for writing their names on the proposal form, members were permitted to append the initials "F.S.Sc." to their names, and to wear gowns and hoods. The conclusion was as follows:

"The Society seems, in short, to be founded on the continental system by which the right to use magic letters and titles, usually associated with degrees, can be purchased without examination. Such a system, to our mind, can only have an injurious effect upon true science and art - in the colonies certificates so obtained might be used by unqualified persons to impose upon the public as skilled teachers - and if the Society is earnest in its purposes, and wishes to earn the confidence of the scientific and art world, the sooner it alters its methods the better."^{Auckland Star, 18 October 1886}

In 1892, The Times-Picayune of New Orleans described the Society as "bogus."

=== Rebuttals ===
On 6 March 1884, The Times printed a rebuttal by Sir H.V. Goold. This reply to the Royal Society of Arts set out the aims of the Society and declared that many of its members were also members of the Society of Arts (although he did not mention that they wanted their money back).

On 3 January 1894, The New Zealand Herald printed a rebuttal by the former embezzler and writer Joseph Ostler (1827–1905), alias C. Frusher Howard F.S.Sc. He was referring to similar comments which had been printed in London Truth and the Herald. He had joined in 1885, and considered it a "worthy and useful institution." He said that its headquarters at Addison House, Kensington, was a large house containing a library, museum and lecture hall. He expounded on the aims and doings of the Society, the quality of the members and their satisfaction in supporting the Society financially, themselves. He also complained of "scandalous misrepresention."

=== Those who declined Fellowship ===
Lorimer Fison was president of the anthropological section of the Australian and New Zealand Association for the Advancement of Science, and he received an offer of Fellowship from the Society which he declined.

== Exposé ==
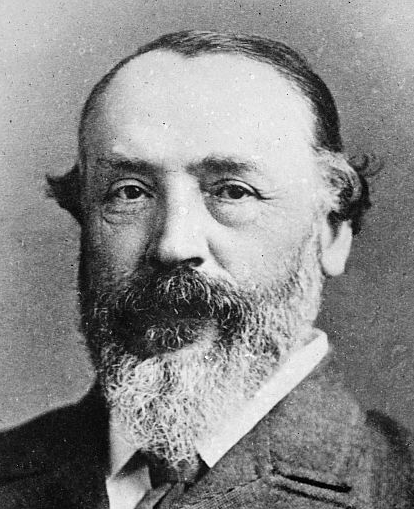
Henry Labouchère who exposed the fraud

On 21 August 1892, Henry Labouchère published an article in the investigative journal, Truth, exposing the Society as a fraud. The Hon. Secretary of the Society, Dr Edward Albert Sturman, M.A., F.R.S.L. had been following the example of a 20-year contemporaneous swindling operation entitled the International Society of Literature, Science and Art, known as the International, a hollow money-making venture in which the novelist Sir Gilbert Campbell was used as bait. William James Morgan, William Tolmie and others were tried and imprisoned for deception and fraud. The International and the SSLA were not rivals: while his swindle was still functioning Tomie has written to Sturman in friendship, saying, "There is plenty of room for both of us, and though we work on somewhat similar lines, they need not be opposing ones."

According to Labouchère, Dr Sturman explained that his M.A. was an honorary degree from the University of Washington, and that he was a Fellow of the Royal Society of Literature. Even if this were true, it gives no evidence of a doctorate. According to Sturman, the Society had been established in 1882 with three other members: Goold, a Miss Button who had since died, and Rev. Irvine Coates. Sturman said that in 1892 the Society consisted of "1,500 men and women interested in learning and education" but that they were reluctant to continue to pay their guineas for membership, and that he "got as many as we can get out of them." From the Society's income, Sturman in his capacity as Secretary would officially receive £300 per annum plus the Society's rent for his Holland Road establishment, and his wife would receive £50 as Lady Secretary. Goold officially gave his services free. However Sturman was not able to say that he did not take all the income for his family and share some of it with Goold. He "lived on the Society and was the Society." The majority of the Society's income came from school examinations; this consisted of mailing out exam papers and not examining candidates. Sturman sold diplomas and "shared the proceeds with Goold . . . the examinations were a farce." Labouchère said,

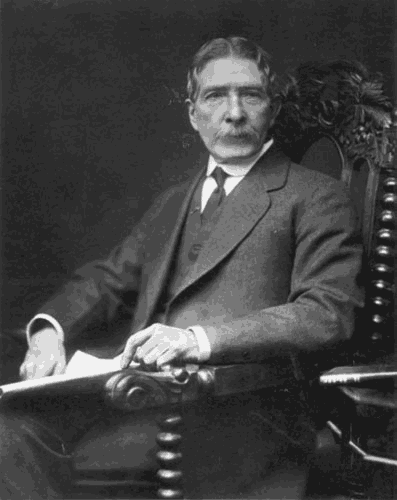
E.R. Tregear, who refused the Society's Fellowship

"It seems to me that the same result might be obtained much more economically if the "Fellows" of all these concerns would keep their guineas in their pockets and write themselves down "A.S.S." without permission of anybody."

Fellows and members of the Society were too embarrassed by their own gullibility to take Sturman to Court. Since this 1892 exposé in Truth limited the Society's activities in Europe, Sturman turned to the Colonies for his guineas. However, by the following year newspapers as far away as New Zealand had picked up the story, and the Society's infamy was going before it. In Auckland, The Evening Post of 7 June 1893 heard that Edward Robert Tregear, author of The Maori-Polynesian Comparative Dictionary (1891) had received an unexpected silver medallion from the Society - posted in March and sent by the slow boat - along with the Journal and the usual offer of Fellowship in return for the usual guineas. He refused the Fellowship. Thus continued around the world the disabusement of academics and would-be academics about the Society. The title of the Evening Post's 1893 article was "A bogus literary society."

The Society was still awarding Certificates of Merit for, or in a small private girls' school in Leicester in 1916 when the Honorary President was J Misindsay (?) M.A., LLD, and the Honorary Secretary was John C Mascarewhas PhD, FCS. The Society's offices at that time were 160 Holland Road, Kensington. These certificates, including some 'with Honours', and occasional 'prizes', appear to have been awarded to bright girls, in a variety of subjects including 'Writing' (for younger girls), 'Art Needlework', and 'Pen and Ink Drawing'. The certificates note that the Society was Instituted on 10 November 1881, and Incorporated on 27 August 1895.
