= Mote Park House =

Former house and estate in County Roscommon, Ireland

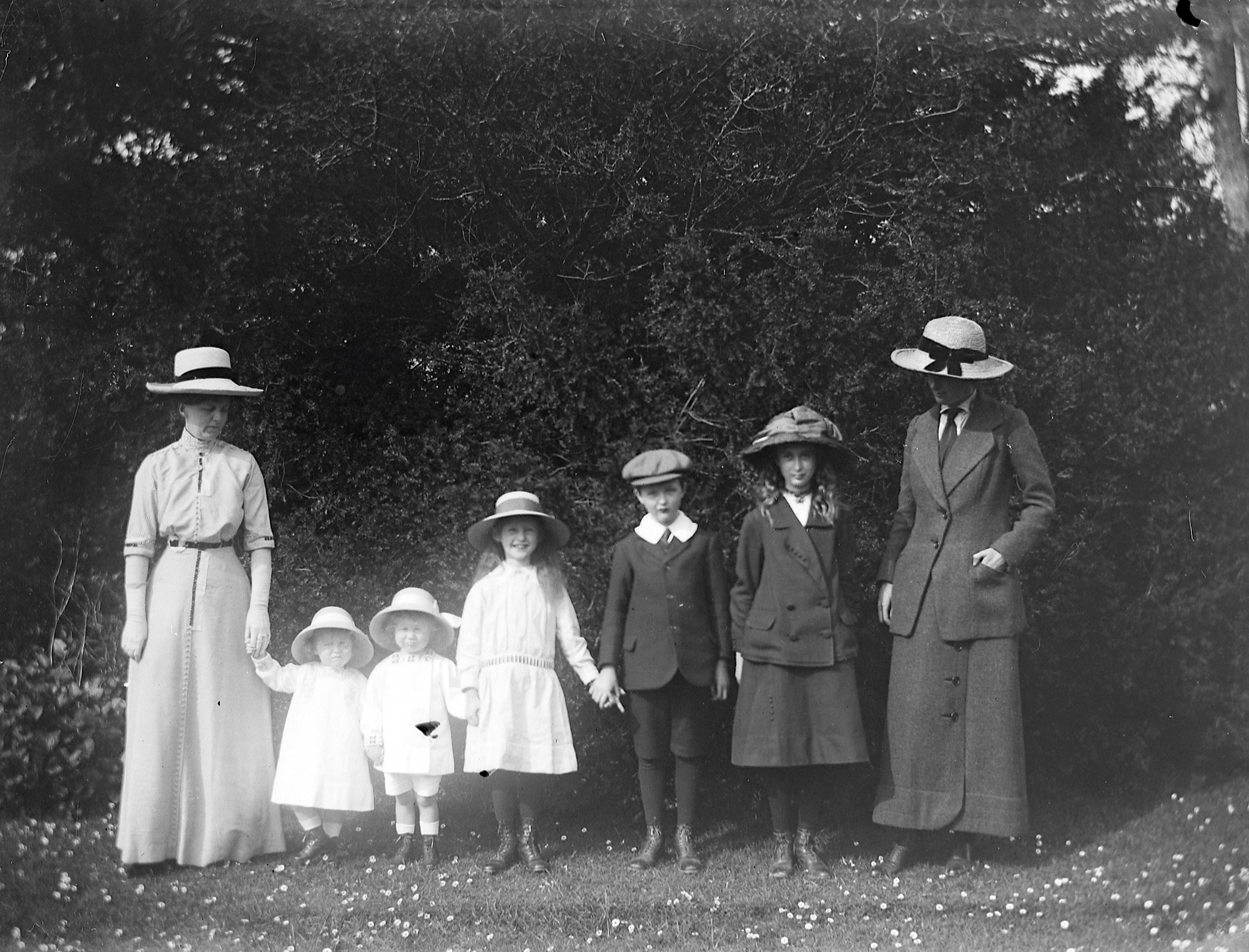
Crofton family at the Mote Park House estate in 1914.

Mote Park House was a house and estate in Ballymurray, County Roscommon, Ireland, the ancestral home of the Crofton family who settled in the area in the sixteenth century. At its height around 1880, the estate contained around 7,000 acres.

The house was finally demolished in 1961 while as of 2023 only the lion gates and lodges and some other ancillary buildings remain.

== History ==
Mote Castle was originally constructed on the lands by George Crofton in the 1620s as both a defensive structure and dwelling. It is likely that it was constructed on the site of a pre-existing O'Kelly tower which was used to protect an important crossing point on the Hind River near Derrydonnell Bridge.

Around 1777-87 a modern Georgian house was constructed on the lands.

The lion gates and gate houses were added around 1800, supposedly to a design by James Gandon.

The house was enlarged to a design by Richard Morrison around 1816 with an additional storey and portico added.

This house was partially gutted by a fire in May 1865 and was rebuilt soon after. By the 1870s, the Croftons owned 10,509 acres of land in County Roscommon.

The last of the Croftons eventually moved out of the house in the 1940s and the house and lands were acquired by the Irish Land Commission. At this time the contents were auctioned off and the house was left vacant from that point on until its eventual demolition in 1961. The house has been offered for sale by the Land Commission in 1958 either intact or demolished.

In 2015, the portico from the house was sold at auction for €12,000.

As of 2023, much of the site of the former Mote Park House encompasses a forest and public park managed by state forestry company, Coillte.
