= Gorges Lowther (1713–1792) =

Member of Irish House of Commons

Gorges Lowther (5 November 1713 – 21 February 1792) was an Irish Member of Parliament.

He was the son of George Lowther of Kilrue, County Meath, by his wife Jane, daughter of Sir Tristram Beresford, 3rd Baronet and Nichola Sophia Hamilton. Sir Marcus Lowther-Crofton, 1st Baronet, was his brother.

He sat in the Irish House of Commons for Ratoath from 1739 to 1760 and for County Meath from 1761 to his death.

He married Judith, daughter of John Ussher and sister of St George St George, 1st Baron St George, and by her was the father of George Lowther.
