= Baron Crofton =

Baron Crofton is a title in the Peerage of Ireland. It was created in 1797 (as Baroness Crofton) for Dame Anne Crofton. She was the widow of Sir Edward Crofton, 2nd Baronet, of the Mote, who had represented County Roscommon in the Irish House of Commons and had been offered a peerage just before his death. The peerage was instead bestowed upon his widow. She was succeeded by her grandson, the second Baron, who had already succeeded as fourth Baronet. He sat in the House of Lords as an Irish representative peer from 1840 to 1869 and served as a Lord-in-waiting (government whip in the House of Lords) in the three Conservative administrations of the Earl of Derby and in Benjamin Disraeli's first government. His son, the third Baron, served as an Irish Representative Peer between 1873 and 1912 and was also State Steward to the Lord Lieutenant of Ireland. His nephew, the fourth Baron, was an Irish Representative Peer from 1916 to 1942. As of 2014 the titles are held by the latter's great-great-grandson, the eighth Baron, who succeeded his father in 2007.

The Crofton Baronetcy, of the Mote, was created in the Baronetage of Ireland in 1758 for Marcus Crofton, who was a Member of the Irish House of Commons. Born Marcus Lowther, he was the husband of Catherine Crofton, daughter of Sir Edward Crofton, 3rd Baronet, of the Mote (a title which became extinct in 1780; see Crofton baronets (1661 creation)). Lowther assumed the surname of Crofton. He was succeeded by his son, the aforementioned second Baronet, whose wife was elevated to the peerage in 1797. On his death, the baronetcy passed to his son, the third Baronet, and then to the latter's son, the fourth Baronet, who in 1817 succeeded his grandmother as second Baron Crofton.

The family seat was Mote House, near Ballymurray, County Roscommon.

== Crofton baronets, of the Mote (1758) ==
- Sir Marcus Lowther-Crofton, 1st Baronet (died 1784)
- Sir Edward Crofton, 2nd Baronet (1748–1797)
- Sir Edward Crofton, 3rd Baronet (1778–1816)
- Sir Edward Crofton, 4th Baronet (1806–1869) (succeeded as Baron Crofton in 1817)

== Barons Crofton (1797) ==
- Anne Crofton, 1st Baroness Crofton (1751–1817)
- Edward Crofton, 2nd Baron Crofton (1806–1869)
- Edward Henry Churchill Crofton, 3rd Baron Crofton (1834–1912)
- Arthur Edward Lowther Crofton, 4th Baron Crofton (1866–1942)
- Edward Blaise Crofton, 5th Baron Crofton (1926–1974)
- Charles Edward Piers Crofton, 6th Baron Crofton (1949–1989)
- Guy Patrick Gilbert Crofton, 7th Baron Crofton (1951–2007)
- Edward Harry Piers Crofton, 8th Baron Crofton (born 1988)

The current heir presumptive is the present holder's twin brother Charles Marcus George Crofton (born 1988).

== See also ==
- Crofton baronets (1661 creation)
- Crofton family
