= Crofton Baronets of Mohill (1801) =

Baronetcy in Ireland

The Crofton Baronetcy, of Mohill in the County of Leitrim, was created in the Baronetage of the United Kingdom on 10 August 1801 for Morgan Crofton. The sixth Baronet was a Lieutenant-Colonel in the 2nd Life Guards and fought in the Second Boer War, where he was severely wounded at the Relief of Ladysmith, and in the two world wars. His diaries from the First World War are published as Massacre of the Innocents: The Crofton Diaries, Ypres 1914–1915 (2004). Another member of the family, James Crofton, grandson of Morgan Crofton, third son of the first Baronet, was a Lieutenant-General in the Army.

Escutcheon of the Crofton baronets of Mohill

== Crofton baronets, of Mohill (1801) ==
- Sir Morgan Crofton, 1st Baronet (1733–1802)
- Sir Hugh Crofton, 2nd Baronet (1763–1834)
- Sir Morgan George Crofton, 3rd Baronet (1788–1867)
- Sir Morgan George Crofton, 4th Baronet (1850–1900)
- Sir Hugh Denis Crofton, 5th Baronet (1878–1902)
- Sir Morgan George Crofton, 6th Baronet (1879–1958)
- Sir Patrick Simon Crofton, 7th Baronet (1936–1987)
- Sir (Hugh) Denis Crofton, 8th Baronet (1937–2016)
- Sir Edward Morgan Crofton, 9th Baronet (b.1945)

The heir apparent is the present holder's son Henry Morgan Crofton (born 1979).

== Notes ==
Baronetage of the United Kingdom
Preceded by Goold baronets	Crofton baronets of Mohill; 10 August 1801	Succeeded by Synge baronets
