= Anne Crofton, 1st Baroness Crofton =

Anglo-Irish peeress

Anne Crofton, 1st Baroness Crofton (11 January 1751 – 12 August 1817) was an Irish suo jure peeress.

== Biography ==
Anne Crofton (née Croker) was the daughter of Thomas Croker of Blackwater, County Kildare and Anne Ryves, daughter and co-heiress of William Ryves of Upper Wood, County Kilkenny. William was a descendant of Sir William Ryves of Damory Court, Dorset who settled in Ireland about 1620 and became a judge of the Court of King's Bench (Ireland).

Crofton was the wife of Sir Edward Crofton, 2nd Baronet, Member of the Irish Parliament for County Roscommon. Sir Edward had been offered a peerage shortly before his death on 30 September 1797. The honour was instead bestowed on his widow Anne, Lady Crofton, who on 1 December 1797 was raised to the Peerage of Ireland as Baroness Crofton.

Lady Crofton died in August 1817, aged 66, and was succeeded in the barony by her grandson Edward.

== Citations ==
Peerage of Ireland
New creation	Baroness Crofton; 1797–1817	Succeeded by Edward Crofton
