= George Lowther (1739–1784) =

Irish Member of Parliament

George Lowther (1739 – 18 August 1784) was an Irish Member of Parliament.

He was the son of Gorges Lowther of Kilrue, County Meath, by his wife Judith, daughter of John Ussher and sister of St George Ussher, 1st Baron St George.

He sat in the Irish House of Commons for Ratoath from 1761 to 1768, for Ardee from 1768 to 1776 and for Newtownards from 1783 to his death.

By his wife Frances, daughter of Chambré Brabazon Ponsonby, he was father of Gorges Lowther.
