= Sir Edward Crofton, 3rd Baronet (1687–1739) =

Anglo-Irish politician

Sir Edward Crofton, 3rd Baronet (25 May 1687 – 11 November 1739) was an Anglo-Irish politician.

Crofton was the son of Sir Edward Crofton, 2nd Baronet and Katherine St George, daughter of Sir Oliver St George, 1st Baronet. He sat in the Irish House of Commons as the Member of Parliament for the borough of Roscommon between 1713 and his death in 1739. In 1733, he was appointed to the Privy Council of Ireland.

He married Mary Nixon, daughter of Anthony Nixon of Dublin, on 4 March 1711. He succeeded to his father's baronetcy on 24 November 1729. Upon his death, he was succeeded by his eldest son, Edward. The later Crofton baronets descended from his daughter Catherine, who married Sir Marcus Lowther-Crofton, 1st Baronet.

== See also ==
- Crofton Baronets of The Mote (first creation, 1661)

Parliament of Ireland
Preceded by David Kennedy; Henry Sandford	Member of Parliament for Roscommon; 1713–1739; With: Henry Sandford (1713–1733); William Sandford (1733–1739)	Succeeded by Thomas Mahon; William Sandford
Baronetage of Ireland
Preceded by Edward Crofton	Baronet (of the Mote); 1729–1739	Succeeded by Edward Crofton
