= Crofton baronets =

Set index for Crofton baronets

There have been four baronetcies created for persons with the surname Crofton, two in the Baronetage of Ireland and two in the Baronetage of the United Kingdom. As of 2023, three creations are extant; one is held with a barony.

- Crofton Baronets of The Mote (first creation, 1661)
- Crofton baronets of The Mote (second creation, 1758): see Baron Crofton
- Crofton Baronets of Mohill (1801)
- Crofton Baronets of Longford House (1838)
