= Sir Edward Crofton, 2nd Baronet =

Irish politician (1748–1797)

Sir Edward Crofton, 2nd Baronet (11 October 1748 – 30 September 1797) was an Irish politician.

Crofton was the son of Sir Marcus Lowther-Crofton, 1st Baronet and his wife, Catherine (née Crofton) and succeeded to the baronetcy on the death of his father in 1784.

He served as High Sheriff of Roscommon for 1773 and then sat in the Irish House of Commons as representative for County Roscommon from 1775 until his death in 1797.

His sister Susanna married the prominent judge Peter Metge. The two men apparently quarrelled and fought a duel, which excited some comments even in an era when duelling was common.

In 1797 he was offered a peerage but died shortly afterwards, aged 48, before the patent had been completed. The honour was instead bestowed, on 1 December 1797, on his wife Anne, Lady Crofton (d. 1817), who was created Baroness Crofton in the Peerage of Ireland. She was the daughter of Thomas Croker and Anne Ryves.

Sir Edward was succeeded in the baronetcy by his son and namesake, Sir Edward Crofton, 3rd Baronet. A daughter, Louisa (d. 1805) married in 1803, as his first wife, Sir Peregrine Maitland.

== See also ==
- Baron Crofton#Crofton baronets, of the Mote (1758)

== Notes ==
Parliament of Ireland
Preceded by John French; Thomas Mahon	Member of Parliament for County Roscommon; 1775–1797; With: Thomas Mahon 1775–1782; Maurice Mahon 1782–1783; Arthur French 1783–1797	Succeeded by George King, Viscount Kingsborough; Arthur French
Baronetage of Ireland
Preceded by Marcus Lowther-Crofton	Baronet (of The Mote); 1784 – 1797	Succeeded by Edward Crofton
