= Henry Hamilton (Irish politician) =

Irish MP (1692–1743)

The Honourable Henry Hamilton (1692–1743) was an Irish politician who sat in two Irish parliaments.

== Birth and origins ==
Family tree

Henry Hamilton with wife, parents, and other selected relatives. (Note: This family tree is partly derived from the Abercorn pedigree pictured in Cokayne. Also see the lists of siblings and children in the text.)

Frederick; 1590–1647; Soldier	Sidney; Vaughan
James of Manorhamilton d. 1652	Gustavus; 1st Viscount; 1642–1723	Elizabeth; Brooke d. 1721
Frederick c. 1663 – 1715 d.v.p.*	Gustavus c. 1685 – 1735; Politician	Henry; 1692–1743	Mary; Dawson d. 1770
Gustavus; 2nd Viscount; 1710–1746	Frederick; 3rd Viscount; 1710–1746	Richard; 4th Viscount; 1724–1789	Sackville; Hamilton; 1732–1818; Politician	Henry; Hamilton c. 1734 – 1796; Governor

Legend

XXX	Subject of the article	XXX	Viscounts; Boyne

*d.v.p. = predeceased his father (decessit vita patris)

Henry was born in February 1692, the third and youngest son of Gustavus Hamilton and his wife Elizabeth Brooke. His father would in 1715 be ennobled as Baron Stackallan and in 1717 advanced to Viscount Boyne.

Henry's mother was the eldest daughter of Sir Henry Brooke and his second wife, Anne St George. Brooke was knight of Brookeborough, County Fermanagh, and governor of Donegal Castle. Henry had two brothers and one sister, who are listed in his father's article.

== Honourable ==
On 20 October 1715, his father was created Baron Hamilton of Stackallan. As son of a peer Hamilton acquired the style "The Honourable".

== First term as MP ==
In the Irish election of 1715 the Henry Hamilton was elected as one of the two members of parliament (MPs) for St Johnstown Borough in the House of Commons of the only Irish Parliament of King George I. He held that seat during the entire duration of the parliament from 12 November 1715 to 11 June 1727 when it was dissolved by the king's death.

== Marriage and children ==
On 27 October 1722, Hamilton married Mary Dawson, eldest daughter of Joshua Dawson.

Henry and Mary had five sons and two daughters. His third son Sackville was under-secretary to the Lord Lieutenant of Ireland, while his fourth son Henry was governor of Bermuda and Dominica.

== Second term as MP ==
Hamilton did not contest the Irish election of 1727, which was held for the only Parliament of King George II, which lasted from 14 November 1727 to 25 October 1760. However, in 1730 he contested and won the by-election for one of the two seats for County Donegal that resulted from the death of Alexander Montgomery on 19 December 1729. Hamilton sat for this county until his death in 1743 when he was replaced by Andrew Knox. His father and his two older brothers Frederick and Gustavus had also represented County Donegal in the House of Commons.

== Death and timeline ==
He was Collector of the Port of Cork. Henry died on 3 June 1743.

Timeline
Age	Date	Event
0	1692, February	Born
10	1702, 8 Mar	Accession of Queen Anne, succeeding King William III
22	1714, 1 Aug	Accession of King George I, succeeding Queen Anne
23	1715, 20 Oct	Father created Baron Hamilton of Stackallan. He becomes Honourable
23	1715, 12 Nov	Parliament 1715–1727 opened, he represented St Johnstown Borough
30	1722, 27 Oct	Married Mary Dawson.
35	1727, 11 Jun	Accession of King George II, succeeding King George I
37–38	1730	Won a by-election and represented County Donegal in the parliament 1727–1760
51	1743, 10 Jun	Died.

== See also ==
- List of parliaments of Ireland

== Notes and references ==
=== Sources ===
- Arthur, Elizabeth (1976). "Hamilton, Henry". In Halpenny, Francess G. (ed.). Dictionary of Canadian Biography. Vol. IV. Toronto: University of Toronto Press. pp. 321–325. ISBN 978-0-8020-3320-8. – 1771 to 1800
- Burke, Bernard; Burke, Ashworth Peter (1915). A Genealogical and Heraldic History of the Peerage and Baronetage, the Privy Council, Knightage and Companionage (77th ed.). London: Harrison. OCLC 1155471554.
- Cokayne, George Edward (1910). Gibbs, Vicary (ed.). The complete peerage of England, Scotland, Ireland, Great Britain and the United Kingdom, extant, extinct, or dormant. Vol. I (2nd ed.). London: St Catherine Press. OCLC 228661424. – Ab-Adam to Basing (for Abercorn)
- Cokayne, George Edward (1912). Gibbs, Vicary (ed.). The complete peerage of England, Scotland, Ireland, Great Britain and the United Kingdom, extant, extinct, or dormant. Vol. II (2nd ed.). London: St Catherine Press. OCLC 228661424. – Bass to Canning (for Boyne)
- Debrett, John (1828). Peerage of the United Kingdom of Great Britain and Ireland. Vol. II (17th ed.). London: F. C. and J. Rivington. OCLC 54499602. – Scotland and Ireland
- Fryde, Edmund Boleslaw; Greenway, D. E.; Porter, S.; Roy, I., eds. (1986). Handbook of British Chronology. Royal Historical Society Guides and Handbooks, No. 2 (3rd ed.). London: Offices of the Royal Historical Society. ISBN 0-86193-106-8. – (for timeline)
- Granville, Mary (1862). The Autobiography and Correspondence of Mary Granville. Vol. I. London: Richard Bentley.
- Haydn, Joseph (1851). The Book of Dignities; Rolls of the Official Personages of the British Empire. London: Longman, Brown, Green and Longmans. OCLC 457727333.
- House of Commons (1878). Return. Members of Parliament – Part II. Parliaments of Great Britain, 1705–1796. Parliaments of the United Kingdom, 1801–1874. Parliaments and Conventions of the Estates of Scotland, 1357–1707. Parliaments of Ireland, 1599–1800. London: His/Her Majesty's Stationery Office. OCLC 13112546.
- Lodge, John (1789). Archdall, Mervyn (ed.). The Peerage of Ireland or, A Genealogical History of the Present Nobility of that Kingdom. Vol. V. Dublin: James Moore. OCLC 264906028. – Viscounts

Parliament of Ireland
Preceded by James Topham; William Forward	Member of Parliament for St Johnstown; 1725–1727; With: William Forward	Succeeded by Hon. George Hamilton; William Forward
Preceded by Hon. Gustavus Hamilton; Alexander Montgomery	Member of Parliament for County Donegal; 1730–1743; With: Hon. Gustavus Hamilton 1730–1735; George Knox 1735–1741; Sir St George Gore-St George, 5th Bt 1741–1745	Succeeded by Sir St George Gore-St George, 5th Bt; Andrew Knox
