= Frederick Hamilton (soldier) =

Scottish soldier and landowner in Ireland (died 1647)

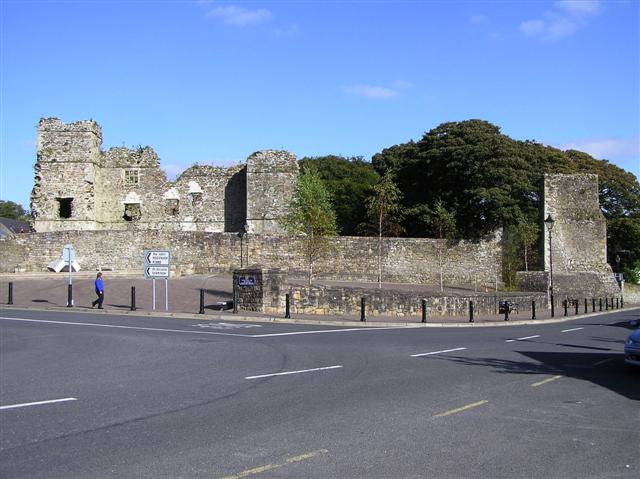
- Ruin of the castle built by Frederick Hamilton at Manorhamilton.
- Born: c. 1590
- Died: 1647
- Spouse: Sidney Vaughan
- Children: Gustavus & others
- Parents: Claud Hamilton, 1st Lord Paisley; Margaret Seton
- Relatives: 7th Lord Seton (grandfather); Frederick Hamilton (grandson); 2nd Viscount Boyne (grandson)

Sir Frederick Hamilton (c. 1590 – 1647) was a Scottish soldier who fought for Sweden in the Thirty Years' War in Germany and for the Covenanters in Ireland, Scotland, and northern England. He built Manorhamilton Castle, County Leitrim, Ireland. His son Gustavus became the 1st Viscount Boyne.

== Birth and origins ==
Frederick was born about 1590 (Note: His birth year is constrained by his parents' marriage in 1574, the gestations of his elder siblings, and his mother's death in 1616.) in Scotland, probably at Paisley. He was the youngest of the five sons that lived to adulthood of Claud Hamilton and his wife Margaret Seton. His father was the 1st Lord Paisley. His father's family descended from Walter FitzGilbert, the founder of the House of Hamilton, who had received the barony of Cadzow from Robert the Bruce. Frederick's mother was a daughter of George Seton, 7th Lord Seton (Note: Numbered as the 5th Lord Seton by Paul.) by his wife Isobel Hamilton. Both parents were Scottish and seem also to have been both Catholic. They had married in 1574.

Family tree

Frederick Hamilton with wife, parents, his four children, and other selected relatives. (Note: This family tree is partly derived from the Abercorn pedigree pictured in Cokayne. Also see the lists of siblings and children in the text.)

James; 2nd Earl c. 1516 – 1575; Châtellerault	Margaret; Douglas	George; 7th Lord; Seton; 1531–1586
James; 3rd Earl; 1537–1609	John; 1st Marquess; Hamilton; 1540–1604	Claud; 1st Lord; Paisley; 1546–1621	Margaret; Seton d. 1616
James; 1st Earl; Abercorn; 1575–1618	Claud of Shawfield d. 1614	George of Greenlaw & Roscrea d. bef. 1657	Frederick; 1590–1647	Sidney; Vaughan
Frederick d. bef. 1646	James of Manor- hamilton d. 1652	Gustavus; 1st Viscount; 1642–1723	Elizabeth; Brooke d. 1721
Frederick c. 1663 – 1715 d.v.p.*	Sophia; Hamilton d. 1748	Gustavus c. 1685 – 1735	Dorothea; Bellew	Henry c. 1692 – 1743
Gustavus; 2nd Viscount; 1710–1746	Frederick; 3rd Viscount; 1710–1746	Richard; 4th Viscount; 1724–1789	Georgiana; Bury

Legend

XXX	Subject of the article	XXX	Earls of Arran	XXX	Viscounts; Boyne	XXX	Marquesses of Hamilton	XXX	Earls of Abercorn

*d.v.p. = predeceased his father (decessit vita patris)

Several of his siblings died in their infancy or childhood. Six reached adulthood and are listed in his father's article.

His mother died in March 1616.

== Plantation ==
He and his brothers James, Claud, and George were involved in James VI and I's Plantations of Ireland. In March 1620, he was given the quarter of Carrowrosse in the Barony of Dromahair in northern County Leitrim. Leitrim is in the province of Connacht but northern Leitrim lies along the border with Ulster. Over the next two decades he increased his estate to 18,000 acres (73 km^{2}). All that land had been seized from the O'Rourke clan in the Plantation of Leitrim.

== Marriage and children ==
On 20 May 1620 Frederick Hamilton married Sidney Vaughan. She was a rich heiress, the only child of Sir John Vaughan, Governor of Londonderry.

Frederick and Sidney had three sons:

1. Frederick (died before 1646), was killed in action in Ireland
2. James of Manorhamilton (died 1652), married his cousin Catherine, daughter of Claud Hamilton, Lord Strabane
3. Gustavus (1642–1723), became the 1st Viscount Boyne

—and one daughter:

1. Christiana (married 1649), married Sir George Munro

== Swedish service ==
In November 1631, he entered Swedish service. He must by that time have converted to Protestantism as a Catholic would not have been acceptable to the Swedes. He became colonel of a Scottish-Irish regiment that served in Germany for 15 months during the Thirty Years' War. They fought in General Tott's army on the Elbe, the Weser and the Rhine. After spending a few years back in Leitrim, he unsuccessfully attempted to re-enter Swedish service in September 1637.

== Ireland ==
About 1638 he built Manorhamilton Castle in northern Leitrim, around which grew the town of Manorhamilton.

Sir Frederick was involved in a lengthy legal dispute over the ownership of parcels of land in the County of Leitrim with Tirlagh Reynolds of Kiltubbrid. On 15 November 1633 an injunction was granted to give Tirlagh possession, but it was dissolved. On 13 June 1634 a second injunction in favour of Tirlagh was granted. A Chancery order of 19 December 1634 dissolved that second injunction. On 5 December 1640, the committee for Irish affairs of the Long Parliament heard four petitions from Sir Frederick in this respect. The Down Survey shows Tirlagh Reynolds as owner of several parcels in southern Leitrim in 1641.

During the Irish Rebellion of 1641, Manorhamilton Castle was besieged several times, but remained intact. In the ensuing Irish Confederate Wars he fought for the Scottish Covenanters trying to keep the Confederates out of the north of Ireland. In 1643, after another unsuccessful attack upon the castle, he hanged 58 of his enemies from a scaffolding in front of the castle.

On 1 July 1642, in retribution for cattle raids by the O'Rourke clan, he sacked the nearby town of Sligo, burning part of it, including Sligo Abbey, a Dominican friary. Local legend tells that on the way over the mountains back to Manorhamilton Castle, some of his men got lost in heavy fog. A guide on a white horse offered to lead them safely over the mountain, but intentionally led the men over a cliff and to their doom. This legend is the subject of a short story by Yeats, entitled The Curse of the Fires and of the Shadows.

== Scotland ==
The "Cessation" ceasefire of September 1643, negotiated by the Marquess of Ormond, was not recognised by the Covenanters, with whom he was allied. The war in Leitrim and Ulster therefore went on. However, after 1643 he left Ireland for Scotland where he became a colonel of a regiment of horse in the army of the Solemn League and Covenant, commanded by Alexander Leslie, 1st Earl of Leven, fighting in Scotland and Northern England. In Ireland he still retained the command of his foot regiment in western Ulster where his sons Frederick and James probably stood in for him. However, his son Frederick was killed and on 5 June 1646 the Covenanter army under Robert Monro lost the Battle of Benburb against the Confederates under Owen Roe O'Neill, after which they retreated to Carrickfergus, abandoning Leitrim and southern Ulster to the Confederates.

== Death, succession, and timeline ==
In 1647, Sir Frederick, aged 57, left the then disbanding army of the Solemn League and Covenant and retired to Edinburgh, where he died later that year in relative poverty. He had received very little compensation for his military efforts from the English parliament. He was succeeded by his son James, who had two daughters, one a Lady Judith Hamilton, with whom Manorhamilton passed out of the family. In 1652 Manorhamilton Castle was burned by Ulick Burke, 1st Marquess of Clanricarde, who had taken over as leader of the royalists from Ormond. The castle then fell into ruins.

Timeline
As his birth date is uncertain, so are all his ages.
Age	Date	Event
0	1590, estimate	Born in Scotland.
12–13	1603, 24 Mar	Accession of King James I, succeeding Queen Elizabeth I
25–26	1616, Feb	Mother died.
29–30	1620, Mar	Granted land in northern County Leitrim during the Plantation of Ireland
34–35	1625, 27 Mar	Accession of King Charles I, succeeding King James I
40–41	1631, Nov	Entered Swedish service and campaigned in Germany for 15 months.
43–44	1634	Started building Manorhamilton Castle
50–51	1641, 23 Oct	Outbreak of the Rebellion
51–52	1642, 1 July	Burned Sligo Abbey
52–53	1643	Joined the army of the Solemn League and Covenant allied with the English Parliament against Charles I.
55–56	1646, 5 Jun	Battle of Benburb
56–57	1647	Died in Edinburgh

== Notes and references ==
=== Sources ===
- Bergin, John (October 2009). McGuire, James; Quinn, James (eds.). "Hamilton, Frederick". Dictionary of Irish Biography.
- Cokayne, George Edward (1910). Gibbs, Vicary (ed.). The complete peerage of England, Scotland, Ireland, Great Britain and the United Kingdom, extant, extinct, or dormant. Vol. I (2nd ed.). London: St Catherine Press. OCLC 228661424. – Ab-Adam to Basing
- Coleman, Ambrose (1902). The Ancient Dominican Foundations of Ireland; an Appendix to O'Heyn's "Epilogus Chronologicus". Dundalk: William Tempest.
- Chisholm, Hugh, ed. (1910). "Hamilton (family)" . Encyclopædia Britannica. Vol. 12 (11th ed.). Cambridge University Press. pp. 878–879.
- D'Ewes, Simonds (1923). Notestein, Wallace (ed.). The Journal of Sir Simonds d'Ewes. New Haven: Yale University Press.
- Duffy, Seán (2002). The Illustrated History of Ireland. New York: Contemporary Books. ISBN 0-8092-2437-2.
- Fryde, E. B.; Greenway, D. E.; Porter, S.; Roy, I., eds. (1986). Handbook of British Chronology. Royal Historical Society Guides and Handbooks, No. 2 (3rd ed.). London: Offices of the Royal Historical Society. ISBN 0-86193-106-8. – (for timeline)
- Lodge, John (1789). Archdall, Mervyn (ed.). The Peerage of Ireland or, A Genealogical History of the Present Nobility of that Kingdom. Vol. V. Dublin: James Moore. OCLC 264906028. – Viscounts
- O'Rorke, Terence (1890). The History of Sligo: Town and County. Vol. I. Dublin: James Duffy. – Town
- Paul, Sir James Balfour (1904). The Scots Peerage, Founded on Wood's Edition of Sir Robert Douglas's Peerage of Scotland. Vol. I. Edinburgh: David Douglas. OCLC 505064285. – Abercorn to Balmerino
- Paul, Sir James Balfour (1907). The Scots Peerage, Founded on Wood's Edition of Sir Robert Douglas's Peerage of Scotland. Vol. IV. Edinburgh: David Douglas. OCLC 505064285. – Fife to Hyndford (for Hamilton)
- Yeats, William Butler (1914). Stories of Red Hanrahan – The Secret Rose – Rosa Alchemica. New York: The MacMillan Company.
- Warner, Ferdinand (1768). History of the Rebellion and Civil-War in Ireland. Vol. I. Dublin: James William. OCLC 82770539. – 1641 to 1643
