= Gustavus Hamilton, 1st Viscount Boyne =

Irish soldier and politician (1642–1723)

Gustavus Hamilton
- Viscount Boyne
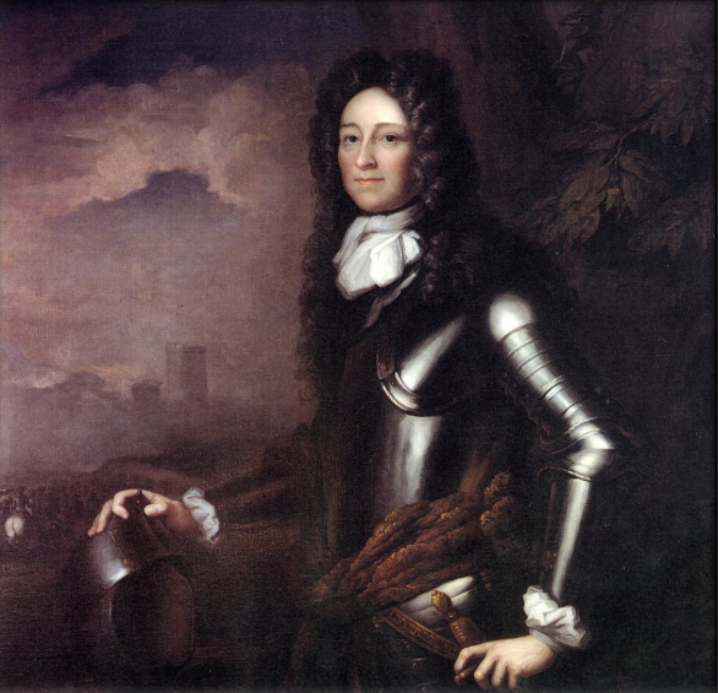
- Detail from the portrait below
- Tenure: 1717–1723
- Successor: Gustavus, 2nd Viscount Boyne
- Born: 1642
- Died: 16 September 1723 (aged 80–81)
- Spouse: Elizabeth Brooke
- Issue Detail: Frederick, Gustavus, Henry, & others
- Father: Frederick Hamilton
- Mother: Sidney Vaughan

Gustavus Hamilton, 1st Viscount Boyne PC (Ire) (1642–1723) was an Irish soldier and politician. In his youth, he fought in his cousin Sir George Hamilton's regiment for the French in the Franco-Dutch War. About 1678 he obtained a commission in the Irish Army. James II appointed him to the Irish Privy Council in 1685.

During the Williamite War Hamilton fought for the Prince of Orange defending Coleraine in 1689, fighting at the Boyne in 1690, fording the Shannon at the Siege of Athlone in June 1691, and fighting at Aughrim in July. George I ennobled him in 1715.

== Birth and origins ==
Family tree

Gustavus Hamilton with his 1st wife, his parents, and other selected relatives. (Note: This family tree is partly derived from the Abercorn pedigree pictured in Cokayne. Also see the list of children in the text.)

Claud; 1st Lord; Paisley; 1546–1621	Margaret; Seton d. 1616
James; 1st Earl; Abercorn; 1575–1618	Frederick; 1590–1647; Soldier	Sidney; Vaughan
George; 1st Baronet; Donalong c. 1608 – 1679	James of Manor- hamilton d. 1652	Gustavus; 1st Viscount; 1642–1723	Elizabeth; Brooke d. 1721
George d. 1676; Soldier	Frederick c. 1663 – 1715 d.v.p.*	Gustavus c. 1685 – 1735; Politician
Gustavus; 2nd Viscount; 1710–1746	Frederick; 3rd Viscount; 1718–1772	Richard; 4th Viscount; 1724–1789

Legend

XXX	Subject of the article	XXX	Viscounts; Boyne	XXX	Earl of Abercorn

*d.v.p. = predeceased his father (decessit vita patris)

Gustavus was born in 1642, (Note: Gustavus was born in 1642 according to Paul and Murtagh, but his birth was previously given as 1639 by Henderson.) probably at Manorhamilton Castle, County Leitrim, Ireland, built by his father. He was the third son of Frederick Hamilton and Sidney Vaughan. His father was the fifth and youngest son of Claud Hamilton, 1st Lord Paisley, Scotland, and brother of James Hamilton, 1st Earl of Abercorn.

Gustavus's mother was the only child and heiress of Sir John Vaughan, who had been governor of Derry. Her family was of Welsh origin.

Gustavus was named for the Swedish king Gustavus Adolphus for whom his father had fought during the Thirty Years' War in Germany. Gustavus had two brothers and one sister, who are listed in his father's article.

== Early life and Franco-Dutch War ==
Hamilton's father died in 1647 in Scotland when Hamilton was about five years old. Hamilton immatriculated at Trinity College Dublin in 1661 but seems to have abandoned his studies without obtaining a degree. In 1672 he went to France and became a captain in the regiment of Sir George Hamilton, his cousin once removed, the son of Sir George Hamilton, 1st Baronet, of Donalong, his first cousin (see family tree). The regiment fought for Louis XIV against the Holy Roman Empire in the Franco-Dutch War (1672–1678) on the upper Rhine in the battles of Sinsheim and Entzheim in 1674, as well as the battles of Turckheim, Sasbach, and Altenheim in 1675. When Sir George was killed in action at the Col de Saverne in 1676, Hamilton left and returned to Ireland.

== Marriage and children ==
Hamilton married before 1686. (Note: His eldest son was born before 1786 as this son must have been at least 21 when elected MP in 1707.) His bride was Elizabeth Brooke, second daughter of Sir Henry Brooke, but eldest daughter by his second wife, Anne St George. Brooke was knight of Brookeborough, County Fermanagh, and governor of Donegal Castle but had died in 1671.

Gustavus and Elizabeth had three sons:

1. Frederick (died 1715), married in 1707; predeceased his father, but his son became the 2nd Viscount.
2. Gustavus of Red Wood, King's County (died 1734), MP for County Donegal
3. Henry (1692–1743), MP for County Donegal

—and daughters:

1. Elizabeth, married Charles Lambart, son of Hon. Oliver Lambart (son of Charles Lambart, 1st Earl of Cavan)
2. Anne, married Charles Stewart (1661-1740), Horn head, Co. Donegal, Ireland.

== Pre-war in Ireland ==
In 1677 Hamilton accompanied James Butler, 1st Duke of Ormond, to Oxford where he was awarded the degree of a Doctor of Civil Law by the University of Oxford. By 1678 he was a captain in the Irish Army.

Hamilton was appointed to the Privy Council of Ireland on the accession of King James II of England in 1685.

In 1688 Hamilton was a major in William Stewart, 1st Viscount Mountjoy's regiment in Derry. On 23 November Tyrconnell ordered Mountjoy to march to Dublin for embarking to England. Mountjoy appointed Robert Lundy governor of the town.

== Williamite War ==
At the Glorious Revolution, Hamilton declared for William of Orange.

In 1689 when Richard Hamilton attacked the Protestants in the north of Ireland, Hamilton organised the defence of Coleraine, which Richard Hamilton reached on 27 March, and resisted five weeks before retreating to Derry.

James called a parliament, known as the Patriot Parliament, which met on 7 May 1689. Hamilton's was one of the 2,470 names on a bill of attainder passed by the parliament. On 18 July the parliament was prorogued. In August Schomberg landed at Bangor.

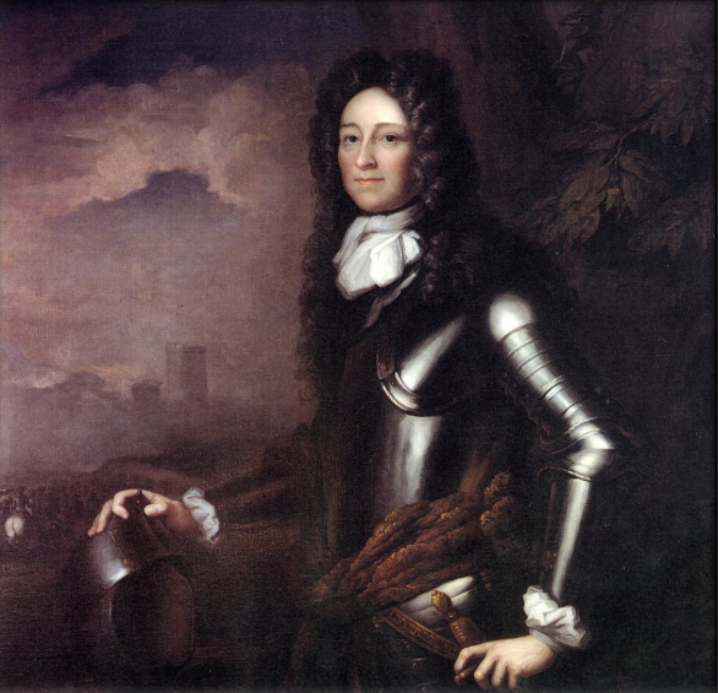
Gustavus Hamilton as a young officer wearing armour

Hamilton commanded a regiment at the Battle of the Boyne on 1 July 1690, when his horse was shot under him and he was almost killed.

In June 1691 he fought at the Siege of Athlone under Ginkel, and on 30 June Hamilton took part in the daring attack over a ford on the River Shannon that captured the town. In this attack he commanded the cavalry together with General Thomas Tollemache, while the infantry was commanded by Mackay, Tettau, Monceau de la Melonière and the Prince of Hesse.

In July he fought at the Battle of Aughrim. Ginkel organised his army into four divisions numbered from the north to the south and in two lines. Gustavus with his regiment was in the front line of the second division, i.e. a centre-right position.

== Vice-admiral of Ulster ==
In 1691 Hamilton was appointed Vice-Admiral of Ulster, an honorary position, which he held until 1710 when he passed it on to his son Frederick. It reverted to him on Frederick's untimely death on 10 December 1715. Hamilton, therefore, was Vice-Admiral of Ulster again from 1716 until his death in 1723.

He was preceded in this office by a certain Gorges, who was appointed in 1666 and whose first name is not known. He was succeeded by Henry Conyngham, who was Vice Admiral of Ulster from 1748 to 1779..

== Irish MP ==
1. Hamilton was elected on 22 September 1692 as one of the two MPs for County Donegal in the 1st Irish Parliament of William III and Mary II (5 October 1692 to 26 June 1693). He gave Rosguill, County Donegal, as his residence.
2. Hamilton was re-elected to his seat for County Donegal at the general election for the 2nd Irish Parliament of King William III (27 August 1695 to 14 June 1699).
3. Hamilton was again re-elected for County Donegal at the general election for the 1st Irish Parliament of Queen Anne (21 September 1703 to 6 May 1713).
4. Hamilton was elected to one of the two seats for Strabane at the 1713 general election for the 2nd Irish Parliament of Queen Anne (25 November 1713 to 1 August 1714).

== Later career ==
Hamilton was promoted brigadier general in 1696 and major general in 1704. In 1706 he resigned from his regiment and was replaced by lieutenant-colonel John Newton. In May 1710, Queen Anne appointed him to the Privy Council of Ireland.

He bought most of the manor of Stackallan in County Meath from the widow of John Osborne, and about 1715 built Stackallan House (also spelled Stackallen) between Navan and Slane on the left bank of the Boyne just north of the N51.

In 1714, at the accession of George I, Hamilton was retained on the new Irish privy council. In 1715 he was elevated to the Peerage of Ireland as Baron Hamilton of Stackallan, in the County of Meath by King George I. On 20 August 1717, Hamilton was further honoured by the king, when he was created Viscount Boyne, in the Province of Leinster, also in the Irish Peerage. In 1719 he participated in the Capture of Vigo.

His wife died in 1721.

== Death, succession, and timeline ==
Lord Boyne died on 16 September 1723 and was buried in the church of Stackallan. His eldest son, Frederick, having predeceased him in 1715, Boyne was succeeded by his grandson Gustavus as the 2nd Viscount Boyne.

Timeline
Age	Date	Event
0	1642	Born in Ireland
4–5	1647	Father died.
6–7	30 Jan 1649	King Charles I beheaded.
17–18	29 May 1660	Restoration of King Charles II
18–19	1661, 17 Apr	Entered Trinity College, Dublin
29–30	1672	Went to France and became a captain in George Hamilton's regiment
29–30	1676	Returned to England or Ireland
34–35	1677	Awarded the degree of Doctor of Civil Law at the University of Oxford
42–43	6 Feb 1685	Accession of King James II, succeeding King Charles II
42–43	1685	Invested as Irish privy councillor by King James II
44–45	8 Jan 1687	Richard Talbot, 1st Earl of Tyrconnell, appointed Lord Deputy of Ireland
46–47	13 Feb 1689	Accession of William III and Mary II, succeeding King James II
46–47	12 Mar 1689	James II landed at Kinsale, Ireland
46–47	1689	Defended Coleraine against Richard Hamilton.
46–47	1689	Attainted by the Patriot Parliament
46–47	13 Aug 1689	Schomberg landed near Bangor.
47–48	1 Jul 1690	Fought at the Battle of the Boyne
48–49	30 Jun 1691	Waded with the Grenadiers through the river at the Siege of Athlone.
49–50	Feb 1692	Youngest son Henry born.
49–50	22 Sep 1692	Elected as MP for County Donegal
53–54	30 May 1696	Appointed brigadier-general
59–60	8 Mar 1702	Accession of Anne, succeeding William III
63–64	1 May 1706	Resigned the command of his regiment
64–65	1 Sep 1707	Eldest son, Frederick, married Sophia Hamilton, sister of the Earl of Clanbrassil.
67–68	May 1710	Invested as Irish privy councillor by Queen Anne
70–71	25 Nov 1713	Elected as MP for Strabane
71–72	1 Aug 1714	Accession of George I, succeeding Anne
72–73	20 Oct 1715	Created Baron Hamilton of Stackallan
72–73	10 Dec 1715	Eldest son, Frederick, died.
74–75	20 Aug 1717	Created Viscount Boyne
78–79	28 Dec 1721	Wife, Elizabeth Brooke, died at Stackallan
80–81	16 Sep 1723	Died and was buried at Stackallan

== See also ==
- List of parliaments of Ireland

== Notes and references ==
=== Sources ===
Subject matter monographs:

- Thomas Finlayson Henderson 1890 in Dictionary of National Biography
- Murtagh 2004 in Oxford Dictionary of National Biography
- Murtagh 2009 in Dictionary of Irish Biography
- Alfred Webb 1878 in Compendium of Irish Biography
- James Wills 1841 in Lives of illustrious and distinguished Irishmen
- "Stackallan House". National Inventory of Architectural Heritage.
- Baker, Sir Sherston (1884). The Office of Vice-Admiral of the Coast. London: privately printed. OCLC 122563772.
- Bergin, John (October 2009). McGuire, James; Quinn, James (eds.). "Hamilton, Frederick". Dictionary of Irish Biography.
- Boyle, John (1867). The Battle-fields of Ireland, from 1688 to 1691. New York: Robert Coddington. OCLC 1041060867.
- Brewer, James Norris (1826). The Beauties of Ireland. Vol. II. London: Sherwood, Gilbert, & Piper. OCLC 4286306. – Leinster (continued: Carlow, Kildare, Queen's County, King's County, Meath, Westmeath, Longford, Louth) & Munster
- Burke, Bernard; Burke, Ashworth Peter (1915). A Genealogical and Heraldic History of the Peerage and Baronetage, the Privy Council, Knightage and Companionage (77th ed.). London: Harrison. OCLC 1155471554. (for Boyne)
- Cannon, Richard (1848). Historical Record of the Twentieth or the East Devonshire Regiment of Foot. London: Parker, Furnivall, & Parker. ISBN 9780665483516. OCLC 1042041845.
- Daniell, Francis Henry Blackburne, ed. (1907). Calendar of State Papers, Domestic Series, March 1st, 1675 to February 29th, 1676, Preserved in the Public Record Office. London: His/Her Majesty's Stationery Office. OCLC 1181376745. – 1675 to 1676
- Debrett, John (1828). Peerage of the United Kingdom of Great Britain and Ireland. Vol. II (17th ed.). London: F. C. and J. Rivington. OCLC 54499602. – Scotland and Ireland
- Doherty, Richard (1998). The Williamite War in Ireland. Dublin: Four Courts. ISBN 1-85182-375-1.
- Doherty, Richard (2008). The Siege of Derry 1689 – The Military History. Stroud, Gloucestershire, England: Spellmount. ISBN 978-1-86227-454-9. – (Snippet view)
- Fryde, Edmund Boleslaw; Greenway, D. E.; Porter, S.; Roy, I., eds. (1986). Handbook of British Chronology. Royal Historical Society Guides and Handbooks, No. 2 (3rd ed.). London: Offices of the Royal Historical Society. ISBN 0-86193-106-8. – (for timeline)
- G. E. C. (1910). Gibbs, Vicary (ed.). The Complete Peerage of England, Scotland, Ireland, Great Britain and the United Kingdom, Extant, Extinct, or Dormant. Vol. I (2nd ed.). London: The St Catherine Press. OCLC 1042385438. – Ab-Adam to Basing (for Family Tree)
- G. E. C. (1912). Gibbs, Vicary (ed.). The Complete Peerage of England, Scotland, Ireland, Great Britain and the United Kingdom, Extant, Extinct, or Dormant. Vol. II (2nd ed.). London: The St Catherine Press. OCLC 228661424. – Bass to Canning (for Boyne)
- G. E. C. (1913). Gibbs, Vicary (ed.). The complete peerage of England, Scotland, Ireland, Great Britain and the United Kingdom, extant, extinct, or dormant. Vol. III (2nd ed.). London: St Catherine Press. OCLC 228661424. – Canonteign to Cutts (for Conyngham)
- Haydn, Joseph (1851). The Book of Dignities; Rolls of the Official Personages of the British Empire. London: Longman, Brown, Green and Longmans. OCLC 457727333.
- Henderson, Thomas Finlayson (1890). "Hamilton, Gustavus, Viscount Boyne (1639–1723)". In Lee, Sidney (ed.). Dictionary of National Biography. Vol. XXIV. New York: MacMillan and Co. pp. 159–160. OCLC 8544105.
- House of Commons (1878). Return. Members of Parliament – Part II. Parliaments of Great Britain, 1705–1796. Parliaments of the United Kingdom, 1801–1874. Parliaments and Conventions of the Estates of Scotland, 1357–1707. Parliaments of Ireland, 1599–1800. London: His/Her Majesty's Stationery Office. OCLC 13112546.
- Joyce, Patrick Weston (1903). A Concise History of Ireland from the Earliest Times to 1837 (12th ed.). Dublin: M. H. Gill & Son. OCLC 815623752.
- Lewis, Samuel (1840). A Topographical Dictionary of Ireland. Vol. II (2nd ed.). London: S. Lewis & Co. OCLC 1040258496. – G to Z
- Lodge, John (1789a). Archdall, Mervyn (ed.). The Peerage of Ireland or, A Genealogical History of the Present Nobility of that Kingdom. Vol. III. Dublin: James Moore. OCLC 264906028. – Earls (for Clanbrassil)
- Lodge, John (1789b). Archdall, Mervyn (ed.). The Peerage of Ireland or, A Genealogical History of the Present Nobility of that Kingdom. Vol. V. Dublin: James Moore. OCLC 264906028. – Viscounts (for Boyne)
- Lodge, John (1789c). Archdall, Mervyn (ed.). The Peerage of Ireland or, A Genealogical History of the Present Nobility of that Kingdom. Vol. VI. Dublin: James Moore. OCLC 264906028. – Viscounts, barons
- Marsden, R. G. (1908). "The Vice-Admirals of the Coast". The English Historical Review. 23 (92): 736–757. doi:10.1093/ehr/XXIII.XCII.736. JSTOR 550188.
- McGuire, James (October 2009). McGuire, James; Quinn, James (eds.). "Osborne, John". Dictionary of Irish Biography.
- Murtagh, Harman (2004). "Hamilton, Gustavus, first Viscount Boyne (1642–1723)". In Matthew, Colin; Harrison, Brian (eds.). Oxford Dictionary of National Biography. Vol. 24. New York: Oxford University Press. pp. 809–810. ISBN 0-19-861374-1.
- Murtagh, Harman (October 2009). McGuire, James; Quinn, James (eds.). "Hamilton, Gustavus". Dictionary of Irish Biography.
- Paul, Sir James Balfour (1904). The Scots Peerage, Founded on Wood's Edition of Sir Robert Douglas's Peerage of Scotland. Vol. I. Edinburgh: David Douglas. OCLC 505064285. – Abercorn to Balmerino
- Sainty, John Christopher (2003). "Vice Admirals of the Coasts from 1660". Office-Holders in Modern Britain. Institute of Historical Research. Archived from the original on 30 September 2007.
- Simms, John Gerald (1976). "Chapter XIX: The War of the Two Kings". In Moody, Theodore William; Martin, F. X.; Byrne, Francis John (eds.). A New History of Ireland. Vol. III. Oxford: Oxford University Press. pp. 478–544. ISBN 978-0-1982-0242-4.
- Webb, Alfred (1878). "Hamilton, Gustavus, Viscount Boyne". Compendium of Irish Biography. Dublin: M. H. Gill & Son. pp. 241–242. OCLC 122693688.
- Wills, Rev. James (1841). "Gustavus Hamilton, Viscount Boyne". Lives of illustrious and distinguished Irishmen, from the earliest times to the present period. Vol. III. Dublin: MacGregor, Polson & Co. pp. 358–397. OCLC 1048786228.
- Witherow, Thomas (1879). Derry and Enniskillen in the Year 1689. London & Belfast: William Mallan & Son. OCLC 82779901.

Parliament of Ireland
Preceded by Charles Hamilton; Richard Perkins	Member of Parliament for County Donegal; 1692–1713; With: Charles Hamilton 1692–1695; Henry Conyngham 1695–1707; Frederick Hamilton 1707–1713	Succeeded by Frederick Hamilton; Sir Ralph Gore
Preceded by James Topham; Oliver McCausland	Member of Parliament for Strabane; 1713–1715; With: Oliver McCausland	Succeeded by Richard Stewart; Oliver McCausland
Military offices
Preceded by Sir Richard Peyton	Colonel of Gustavus Hamilton's Regiment of Foot; 1689–1706	Succeeded by John Newton
Honorary titles
Preceded by Gorges	Vice-Admiral of Ulster; 1691–1710	Succeeded by Frederick Hamilton
Preceded by Frederick Hamilton	Vice-Admiral of Ulster; 1716–1723	Succeeded by Henry Conyngham
Peerage of Ireland
New creation	Viscount Boyne; 1717–1723	Succeeded by Gustavus Hamilton
New creation	Baron Hamilton of Stackallan; 1715–1723	Succeeded by Gustavus Hamilton
