= Gustavus Hamilton (politician) =

Irish MP (c.1685–1735)

- Born: c. 1685
- Died: 26 February 1735
- Spouse: Dorothea Bellew
- Issue Detail: Frederick, Richard, & other
- Father: Gustavus Hamilton, 1st Viscount Boyne
- Mother: Elizabeth Brooke

The Honourable Gustavus Hamilton (c. 1685 – 1735) was a Member of the Irish Parliament.

== Birth and origins ==
Family tree

Gustavus Hamilton with wife, parents, and other selected relatives. (Note: This family tree is partly derived from the Abercorn pedigree pictured in Cokayne. Also see the lists of siblings and children in the text.)

Frederick; 1590–1647; Soldier	Sidney; Vaughan
James of Manor- hamilton d. 1652	Gustavus; 1st Viscount; 1642–1723	Elizabeth; Brooke d. 1721
Frederick c. 1663 – 1715 d.v.p.*	Gustavus c. 1685 – 1735	Dorothea; Bellew
Gustavus; 2nd Viscount; 1710–1746	Frederick; 3rd Viscount; 1710–1746	Richard; 4th Viscount; 1724–1789	Georgiana; Bury
Gustavus; 5th Viscount; 1749–1816	Martha; Somerville

Legend

XXX	Subject of the article	XXX	Viscounts; Boyne

*d.v.p. = predeceased his father (decessit vita patris)

Gustavus was born about 1685 in Ireland. He was the second son of Gustavus Hamilton and his wife Elizabeth Brooke. His father would be ennobled in 1715 as Baron Hamilton of StackAllan and advanced to Viscount Boyne in 1717.

Gustavus's mother was the eldest daughter of Sir Henry Brooke by his second wife, Anne St George. Brooke was knight of Brookeborough, County Fermanagh, and governor of Donegal Castle. Gustavus had two brothers and one sister, who are listed in his father's article.

== Honourable ==
On 20 October 1715, his father was created Baron Hamilton of Stackallan. As son of a peer Hamilton acquired the style "The Honourable".

== First term as MP ==
In 1716 Hamilton was elected as member of parliament (MP) to one of the two seats for County Donegal during the only Irish parliament of King George I in the by-election that resulted from his brother Frederick's death. That parliament lasted from 12 November 1715 to 11 June 1727 when it was dissolved by the king's death.

== Marriage ==
In January 1717, Hamilton married Dorothea Bellew, only daughter of Richard Bellew, 3rd Baron Bellew of Duleek.

Gustavus and Dorothea had two sons:

1. Frederick succeeded as 3rd Viscount Boyne
2. Richard succeeded as 4th Viscount Boyne

—and five daughters.

== Second term as MP and death ==
Hamilton was reelected to one of the two seats for County Donegal in the general election of 1727, which was held for the only Irish Parliament of King George II, which lasted from 14 November 1727 to 25 October 1760. Hamilton sat until his death on 26 February 1735.

== See also ==
- List of parliaments of Ireland

== Notes and references ==
=== Sources ===
- Burke, Bernard; Burke, Ashworth Peter (1915). A Genealogical and Heraldic History of the Peerage and Baronetage, the Privy Council, Knightage and Companionage (77th ed.). London: Harrison. OCLC 1155471554.
- Cokayne, George Edward (1910). Gibbs, Vicary (ed.). The complete peerage of England, Scotland, Ireland, Great Britain and the United Kingdom, extant, extinct, or dormant. Vol. I (2nd ed.). London: St Catherine Press. OCLC 228661424. – Ab-Adam to Basing
- Cokayne, George Edward (1912). Gibbs, Vicary (ed.). The complete peerage of England, Scotland, Ireland, Great Britain and the United Kingdom, extant, extinct, or dormant. Vol. II (2nd ed.). London: St Catherine Press. OCLC 228661424. – Bass to Canning
- Debrett, John (1828). Peerage of the United Kingdom of Great Britain and Ireland. Vol. II (17th ed.). London: F. C. and J. Rivington. OCLC 54499602. – Scotland and Ireland
- House of Commons (1878). Return. Members of Parliament – Part II. Parliaments of Great Britain, 1705–1796. Parliaments of the United Kingdom, 1801–1874. Parliaments and Conventions of the Estates of Scotland, 1357–1707. Parliaments of Ireland, 1599–1800. London: His/Her Majesty's Stationery Office. OCLC 13112546. (for MP of County Donegal)
- Lodge, John (1789). Archdall, Mervyn (ed.). The Peerage of Ireland or, A Genealogical History of the Present Nobility of that Kingdom. Vol. V. Dublin: James Moore. OCLC 264906028. – Viscounts (for Boyne)

Parliament of Ireland
Preceded by Hon. Frederick Hamilton; Sir Ralph Gore, 4th Bt	Member of Parliament for County Donegal; 1716–1735; With: Sir Ralph Gore, 4th Bt 1716–1727; Alexander Montgomery 1727–1730; Hon. Henry Hamilton 1730–1735	Succeeded by George Knox; Hon. Henry Hamilton
