= Gustavus Hamilton-Russell, 10th Viscount Boyne =

Irish peer, soldier and banker

Gustavus Michael George Hamilton-Russell, 10th Viscount Boyne KCVO, JP (10 December 1931 – 14 December 1995) was an Irish peer, soldier and banker.

== Background ==
He was the son of Hon. Gustavus Lascelles Hamilton-Russell, oldest son of Gustavus Hamilton-Russell, 9th Viscount Boyne and Lady Margaret Selina Lascelles, and his wife Joan Verena Lloyd-Verney, only daughter of Sir Harry Lloyd-Verney by his wife Lady Joan Cuffe, elder daughter of Hamilton Cuffe, 5th Earl of Desart.

His father having died of wounds received at the Western Front in 1940, he succeeded his grandfather as viscount two years later. He was educated at Eton College and went then to the Royal Military Academy, Sandhurst. He studied later at the Royal Agricultural College.

== Career ==
Boyne was commissioned into the Grenadier Guards in 1952, serving as the Ensign during Trooping the Colour in 1953, retiring as lieutenant. In 1961, he was nominated Justice of the Peace for Shropshire and in 1965, a Deputy Lieutenant for the same county. He became director of the National Westminster Bank in 1976, leaving in 1990.

Boyne was appointed a Lord-in-waiting in 1981 and Lord Lieutenant of Shropshire in 1994, holding both posts until his death in 1995.

Boyne was a Knight of the Venerable Order of Saint John, and in the latter year he was also appointed a Knight Commander of the Royal Victorian Order.

== Family ==
On 11 April 1956, he married Rosemary Anne Stucley, second daughter of Sir Dennis Stucley, 5th Baronet. They had three daughters and a son. Boyne died aged 64, only days after his birthday and was succeeded in the viscountcy by his only son Gustavus, "Tavie."

Honorary titles
Preceded by Sir John Robert Stratford Dugdale	Lord Lieutenant of Shropshire; 1994–1995	Succeeded by Sir Algernon Eustace Heber-Percy
Peerage of Ireland
Preceded by Gustavus Hamilton-Russell	Viscount Boyne; 1942–1995	Succeeded by Gustavus Hamilton-Russell
