= County Donegal (Parliament of Ireland constituency) =

Pre-1801 Irish constituency

- Former county constituency for the Irish House of Commons
- County: County Donegal

–1801
- Seats: 2
- Replaced by: County Donegal (UKHC)

County Donegal was a constituency represented in the Irish House of Commons until its abolition on 1 January 1801. The county received two seats at Westminster thereafter.

== History ==
In the Patriot Parliament of 1689 summoned by James II, County Donegal was not represented. Between 1725 and 1793 Catholics and those married to Catholics could not vote.

== Members of Parliament ==
Election	First MP		Second MP	
1613	Sir John Vaughan		Sir William Stewart	
1634	Sir John Vaughan		Sir William Stewart	
1639	Sir Ralph Gore		Sir Paul Davys	
1656	Sir Tristram Beresford, 1st Baronet		Thomas Newburgh	
1661	Charles Hamilton		Richard Perkins	
1689	County Donegal was not represented in the Patriot Parliament			
1692	Charles Hamilton		Gustavus Hamilton	
1695	Henry Conyngham		Gustavus Hamilton	
1707	Frederick Hamilton (Note: Styled as The Honourable from 1715)	Whig	Gustavus Hamilton	
1713	Frederick Hamilton	Whig	Sir Ralph Gore, 4th Bt	Whig
1716	The Hon. Gustavus Hamilton		Sir Ralph Gore, 4th Bt	Whig
1727	The Hon. Gustavus Hamilton		Alexander Montgomery	
1730	The Hon. Gustavus Hamilton		The Hon. Henry Hamilton	
1735	George Knox		The Hon. Henry Hamilton	
1741	Sir St George Gore-St George, 5th Bt		The Hon. Henry Hamilton	
1743	Sir St George Gore-St George, 5th Bt		Andrew Knox	
1747	Sir Ralph Gore, 6th Bt		Andrew Knox	
1765	Robert Clements		Andrew Knox	
1768	John McCausland		Alexander Montgomery	Patriot
1776	Robert Clements		Alexander Montgomery	Patriot
1783	Henry Vaughan Brooke		Alexander Montgomery	Patriot
1790	Henry Vaughan Brooke		Alexander Montgomery	Patriot
1800	Henry Vaughan Brooke		Viscount Sudley	
1801	Succeeded by the Westminster constituency County Donegal			

== Bibliography ==
- O'Hart, John (2007). The Irish and Anglo-Irish Landed Gentry: When Cromwell came to Ireland. Vol. II. Heritage Books. ISBN 0-7884-1927-7.
- Leigh Rayment's historical List of Members of the Irish House of Commons. Cites: Johnston-Liik, Edith Mary (2002). The History of the Irish Parliament 1692-1800 (6 volumes). Ulster Historical Foundation.
