= List of vice-admirals of Ulster =

Vice Admiral of Ulster
- Country: United Kingdom
- Type: Naval administration
- Role: Admiralty court and Naval Jurisdiction.

This is a list of the vice-admirals of Ulster, a province in the north of Ireland.

Prior to 1585, the whole of Ireland was served by a single vice-admiral, namely: the 3rd Earl of Sussex (1558–1565); the 11th Earl of Kildare (1564–1573); and the 10th Earl of Ormonde (1585). Separate vice-admiralties were then established for Munster in 1585, for Ulster by 1602, for Leinster by 1612 and for Connaught by 1615.

== Vice-admirals of Ulster ==
Source (1602–61):

Source (1661–1876):

Ulster

- 1585–1602 no appointment known
- 1602–1625 The 1st Baron Chichester (previously known, up until 1613, as Sir Arthur Chichester)
- 1625–1639 The 1st Viscount Chichester
- 1639–? no appointment known
- ?–1647 Sir William Stewart, 1st Baronet
- 1647–1660 no appointment known
- 1661 John Davis
- 1666 Gorges
- 1691–1709 Gustavus Hamilton
- 1710–1715 Frederick Hamilton
- 1716–1723 Gustavus Hamilton
- 1748–1779 The 1st Earl Conyngham
- 1779–1796 William Burton (Conyngham)
- 1822–1841 The 1st Earl O'Neill
- 1841–1849 The 2nd Earl of Gosford
- 1849–1876 The 2nd Marquess Conyngham
- The 3rd Marquess Conyngham (died 1882)
- The 4th Earl of Gosford (died 1922)

Northern Ireland

- 1923 The 3rd Marquess of Dufferin and Ava (died 1930)
- 1937–1961 The 4th Earl of Kilmorey
- 1961–1973 The 1st Viscount Brookeborough
