= Charles Hamilton (MP, died 1710) =

Irish politician

Charles Hamilton (before 1640 – 25 July 1710) was an Irish Member of Parliament.

== Biography ==
The son of Charles Hamilton, his estate of Cavanough included lands in Raphoe, Letterkenny and Kilmacrenan, County Donegal. He represented the county in the Parliament of 1661–1666 and was high sheriff in 1687–1688. He sat for the county again in the Parliament of 1692–1693, and then for Killybegs from 1695 (when he supported the impeachment of Sir Charles Porter) to 1699 and from 1703 until his death. After the accession of Queen Anne he supported the opposition. His wife was Catherine, daughter of Sir Henry Brooke; her sister Elizabeth married Gustavus Hamilton, 1st Viscount Boyne.
