= The Curse of the Fires and of the Shadows =

Short story by William Butler Yeats

"The Curse of the Fires and of the Shadows" is a short story by William Butler Yeats in his collection Stories of Red Hanrahan, The Secret Rose, Rosa Alchemica published by Macmillan in 1914. It is based on Sir Frederick Hamilton's burning of Sligo Abbey in 1642 during the Irish Confederate Wars. In Yeats's story, five soldiers who shoot the monks are cursed by the abbot and, when ordered by Hamilton to intercept two messengers sent by the people of Sligo to call for help, they lose their way in the forest and are then led over a cliff by a vengeful sidhe.

== Notes and references ==
- Yeats, William Butler (1914), Stories of Red Hanrahan - The Secret Rose - Rosa Alchemica, New York: The MacMillan Company, pp. 134–144
