= Alexander Montgomery (1686–1729) =

Irish soldier and politician

Colonel Alexander Montgomery (1686 – 19 December 1729) was an Irish soldier and politician.

Montgomery, of the Scots Greys cavalry, lived in Convoy House, Convoy, County Donegal, Ireland. He was born into an Ulster Scots gentry family in 1686, the second son of Major John Montgomery and his first wife Catherine, the daughter of the Reverend James Auchinleck. The Montgomerys of Convoy were part of the County Donegal branch of the Clan Montgomery. He was elected member of parliament (MP) for Donegal Borough in 1725 until the general election in 1727 and was then returned for County Donegal in 1727 until his death on 19 December 1729, at the age of 43. He was buried at the Church of St. Nicholas Within the Walls, Nicholas Street, Dublin on 22 December 1729. He married Elizabeth Percy, a daughter of Colonel Henry Percy (or Piercy) of Seskin, County Wicklow. His wife predeceased him in December 1724 and was also interred at St. Nicholas on 5 January 1725.

He inherited lands at Croghan, just outside Lifford in East Donegal, and in 1711 he purchased more lands at Tullydonell from James Nesbit. By 1720 he had also bought his main residence of Convoy, County Donegal. As it took more than a day to travel during his commute between Parliament in Dublin and his estate in Convoy, he bought the Gwyllym estate of 4,000 acres (16 km^{2}) for £8,000 in 1724, halfway between both, at Ballyconnell in County Cavan to allow him to break the journey overnight. In his will, he left it to his nephew George Leslie, who then assumed the name George Leslie Montgomery, MP for Cavan until 1787. He left no issue. His will is dated 4 July 1727 with a codicil dated 17 December 1728 stating- "Alexander Montgomery of Dublin City and of Ballyconnell, County Cavan to be buried with wife in Dublin if he dies there. My estates in Counties Cavan and Fermanagh and leaseholds in County Donegal to trustees for my nephew George Leslie, aged under 21, son of Rev. George Leslie of Clownish, County Monaghan, and of my sister Margaret Leslie Montgomery, his wife, then for Robert Montgomery, fourth son of my uncle Alexander, then for Matthew Montgomery". (The 'uncle Alexander', referred to in the will, was Colonel Alexander Montgomery (1667–1722) M.P. for County Monaghan and the grandfather of the famous American Revolution war-hero, Major-General Richard Montgomery). Probate was granted on 5 January 1729.

Up to 1729, Alexander Montgomery shared the parliamentary patronage of Lifford, County Donegal, with the Creighton family, later the Earls of Erne. There is an agreement in the Erne papers (held in P.R.O.N.I. in Belfast) dated 1727 between Alexander Montgomery and General David Creighton about the sharing of Lifford Corporation and its representation in the Irish House of Commons, to which it sent two MP's. One of the articles of agreement was that, if Montgomery should die without a son, then his interest should pass to the Creightons. Montgomery was elected as an MP for County Donegal in the general election held later in 1727 so the said General David Creighton and his son and heir, Abraham Creighton, (later the 1st Lord Erne) were returned as the two Lifford MPs. General David Creighton died in 1728 so the Lifford seat was filled by Thomas Montgomery (1700– April 1761), the 1st cousin of Alexander and father of the aforementioned Major-General Richard Montgomery. On the death of the said Thomas Montgomery in 1761, full control of the Lifford seats passed to said Abraham Creighton.

== See also ==
- George Leslie Montgomery (MP)
- Field Marshal The 1st Viscount Montgomery of Alamein
- Clan Montgomery
- Moville
- Ulster Scots people

== Notes ==
Parliament of Ireland
Preceded by Henry Maxwell; Robert Miller	Member of Parliament for Donegal Borough; 1725–1727; With: Henry Maxwell	Succeeded by Henry Maxwell; Arthur Gore
Preceded by Hon. Gustavus Hamilton; Sir Ralph Gore, 4th Bt	Member of Parliament for County Donegal; 1727–1729; With: Hon. Gustavus Hamilton	Succeeded by Hon. Gustavus Hamilton; Hon. Henry Hamilton
