= Sligo Abbey =

Ruined Dominican friary in Sligo, Ireland

Coordinates: 54.270809°N 8.470091°W

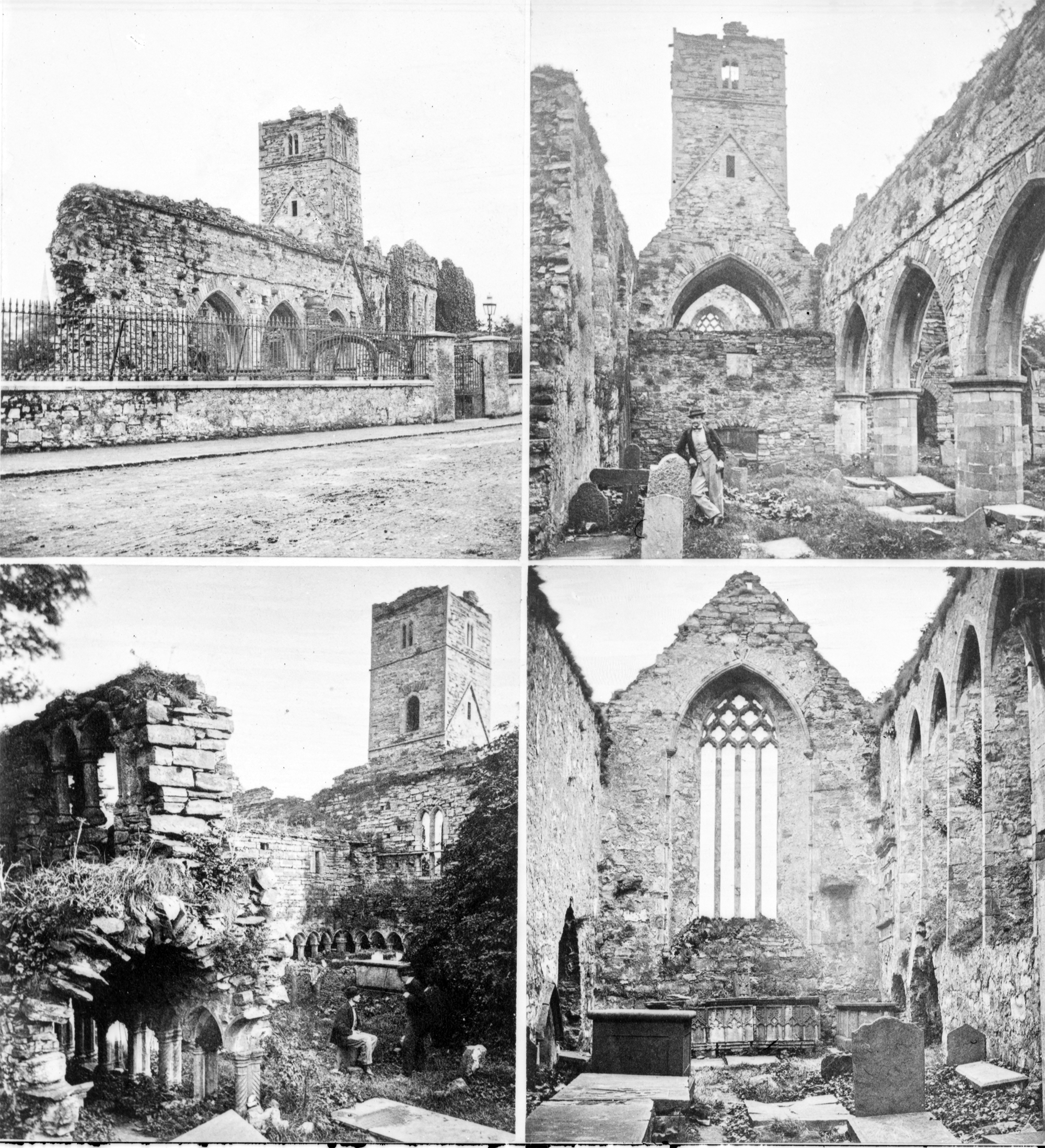
- Interactive map of Sligo Abbey

Monastery information
- Order: Dominican Order
- Established: 1253
- Disestablished: 1760
- Diocese: Elphin

People
- Founder: Maurice Fitzgerald, Baron of Offaly

Architecture
- Style: Norman, Gothic

Site
- Location: Sligo, County Sligo
- Public access: Yes

National monument of Ireland
- Official name: Sligo Abbey
- Reference no.: 189

Sligo Abbey (Irish: Mainistir Shligigh) was a Dominican convent in Sligo, Ireland, founded in 1253. It was built in the Romanesque style with some later additions and alterations. Extensive ruins remain, mainly of the church and the cloister.

The site is managed by the Office of Public Works and opens on a seasonal basis - March 17 to November 5 is the 2023 season. Sligo Abbey is open daily from 10.00 am - 6.00 pm, with last admissions at 5.15 pm.

== Name and location ==
The name "Sligo Abbey" is the generally accepted traditional name, but strictly speaking "abbey" is inappropriate as Dominican monasteries are led by priors not abbots: "convent", "friary", or "priory" would be more correct. The community was dedicated to the Holy Cross. The ruins are located in Abbey Street, Sligo, but when it was still functioning, the convent lay outside the town's limits and its location was then usually described as "near Sligo".

Location in Ireland

== History ==
Sligo Abbey, was a Dominican Friary, founded in 1253 by Maurice FitzGerald, 2nd Lord of Offaly, who was Justiciar of Ireland from 1232 to 1245. His purpose allegedly was to house a community of monks to pray for the soul of Richard Marshal, 3rd Earl of Pembroke, whom he was rumoured to have killed. The Dominicans were a poor choice for such a task as their specialty is preaching rather than praying. FitzGerald built a substantial Norman abbey, with all the essential parts and endowed it with lands.

In 1414 the buildings were damaged in an accidental fire. The abbey did not have sufficient means for the reconstruction and appealed to the pope for help. At that moment three men competed with each other in the Vatican Standoff: Benedict XIII was pope in Avignon, Gregory XII in Rome, and John XXIII in Pisa. As England supported John, this was the pope the abbey addressed. Their letter reached John at the Council of Constance (1414–1418). John replied by sending an apostolic letter from Constance granting indulgences of ten years to all who would visit the church on the feast of the Assumption and the day of Saint Patrick and contribute to its restoration. The friary was rebuilt in 1416 by Prior Brian, son of Dermot MacDonagh, tanist (prince) of Tirerrill and Collooney. There were 20 friars at the abbey at that time.

When the Dissolution of the Irish monasteries that had started in 1530 in the Pale, began to menace monasteries in the West of Ireland, Donogh O'Connor Sligo in 1568 obtained a letter from Queen Elizabeth that exempted Sligo Abbey on condition that the friars would become secular priests.

During Tyrone's Rebellion (1594–1603) the abbey was damaged when Richard Bingham, president of Connaught, besieged Sligo Castle in 1595, which was held by Hugh Roe O'Donnell's men. Bingham stationed six companies of troops and horses in the Abbey, and dismantled the rood screen, using it and other timber from the building to build a siege tower for his unsuccessful attack on the castle. After the war, at the beginning of the 17th century, the abbey and its lands were granted to Sir William Taaffe in consideration of his services to Queen Elizabeth. Sir William was the grandfather of Theobald Taaffe, 1st Earl of Carlingford.

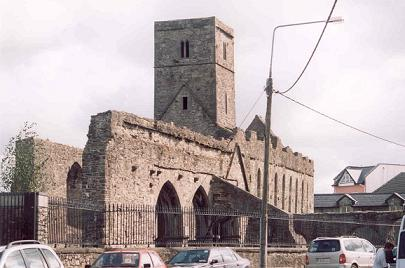
The church, seen from Abbey Street

In 1608 only one friar was left in the abbey, Father O'Duane, who died in this year. However, Father Daniel O'Crean arrived from Spain before O'Duane's death and built up a new community, succeeding so well that in 1627 Ross MacGeoghegan, provincial of the Dominical Order in Ireland, held a provincial chapter in Sligo.

During the Irish Confederate Wars (1641–1653) the convent was attacked and burned by Sir Frederick Hamilton in the summer of 1642. Some of the friars were killed.

In 1697 when King William reigned alone, the Irish Parliament passed the Banishment Act, which specified that all ordinaries (bishops) and regular clergy (e.g. monks) must leave the country before 1 May 1698. It did not affect the parish priests, who are classified as secular priests. The Dominicans of Sligo left Ireland for Spain, led by their prior, Father Patrick McDonogh. The abbey stood then empty.

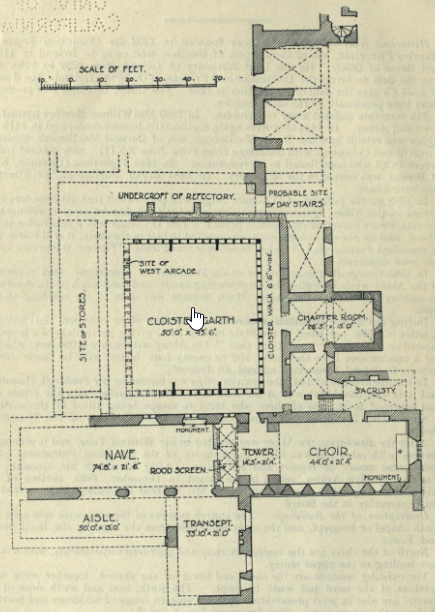
Ground plan

In the 18th century some friars came back to Sligo and stayed in the abbey. In 1760 when Father Lawrence Connellan returned from Louvain to Sligo, he found that the buildings had deteriorated so far that it was necessary to find other accommodation. In 1783 he obtained a lease in High Street and moved there. In the second half of the 18th century, the friars built a chapel in Pound Street. In 1803 a new friary was built. In 1846 Father B. J. Goodman, prior of the friary and provincial of the order, built the Neogothic Holy Cross Church in High Street, and in 1865 another residence for the friars was built behind that church in Dominick Street.

The abbey grounds were used as cemetery. The buildings were quarried for reusable stone. In 1893 Evelyn Ashley, to whom the abbey had come from Lord Palmerston, vested part of it in the Board of Works and the rest followed in 1913, donated by his son Wilfrid William Ashley. The Board then did work on the ruins, freeing them from ivy, bushes and trees growing on it.

Timeline
1253	Founded by Maurice FitzGerald, 2nd Lord of Offaly.
1414	Accidentally burned.
1416	Restored.
1568	Donogh O'Connor Sligo obtained from Queen Elizabeth the exemption from the dissolution of the monasteries.
1595	Damaged in the siege of Sligo Castle by George Bingham during Tyrone's Rebellion.
c. 1603	Granted to William Taaffe, who allowed the friars to stay.
1642	Attacked and burned by Frederick Hamilton during the Irish Confederate Wars.
1698	The friars left for Spain after the Banishment Act.
c. 1770	The friars built a chapel in Pound Street.
1846	The Dominicans built the Holy Cross Church in High Street.
1913	The abbey ruins become possession of Board of Works.

== Architecture ==
The abbey ruins consist of the walls of the church, inclusive those of the tower, three sides of the cloister, and remains of the sacristy, the chapter room, the refectory, and the dormitories. Most of the buildings seem to date from the 13th century, the time of the monastery's foundation and were built in a late romanesque or more specifically Norman Style. In the 15th century late Gothic additions and replacements were made and some others in the 16th century.

The church was never vaulted and, having lost its wooden roof, stands open to the sky. The church's walls are 3 feet 7 inches (1.09 m) thick and their tops are covered with water tables and crowned with ruinous parapets that might once have been crenulated. The church is divided into the choir (or chancel) in the east and the nave in the west by the 15th-century cut-stone rood screen, that consisted of a gallery across the church supported by ribbed groin vaults, three bays wide and one deep. This rood screen has been partially reconstructed from its surviving right and left abutments in the abbey's latest restoration (see photo).

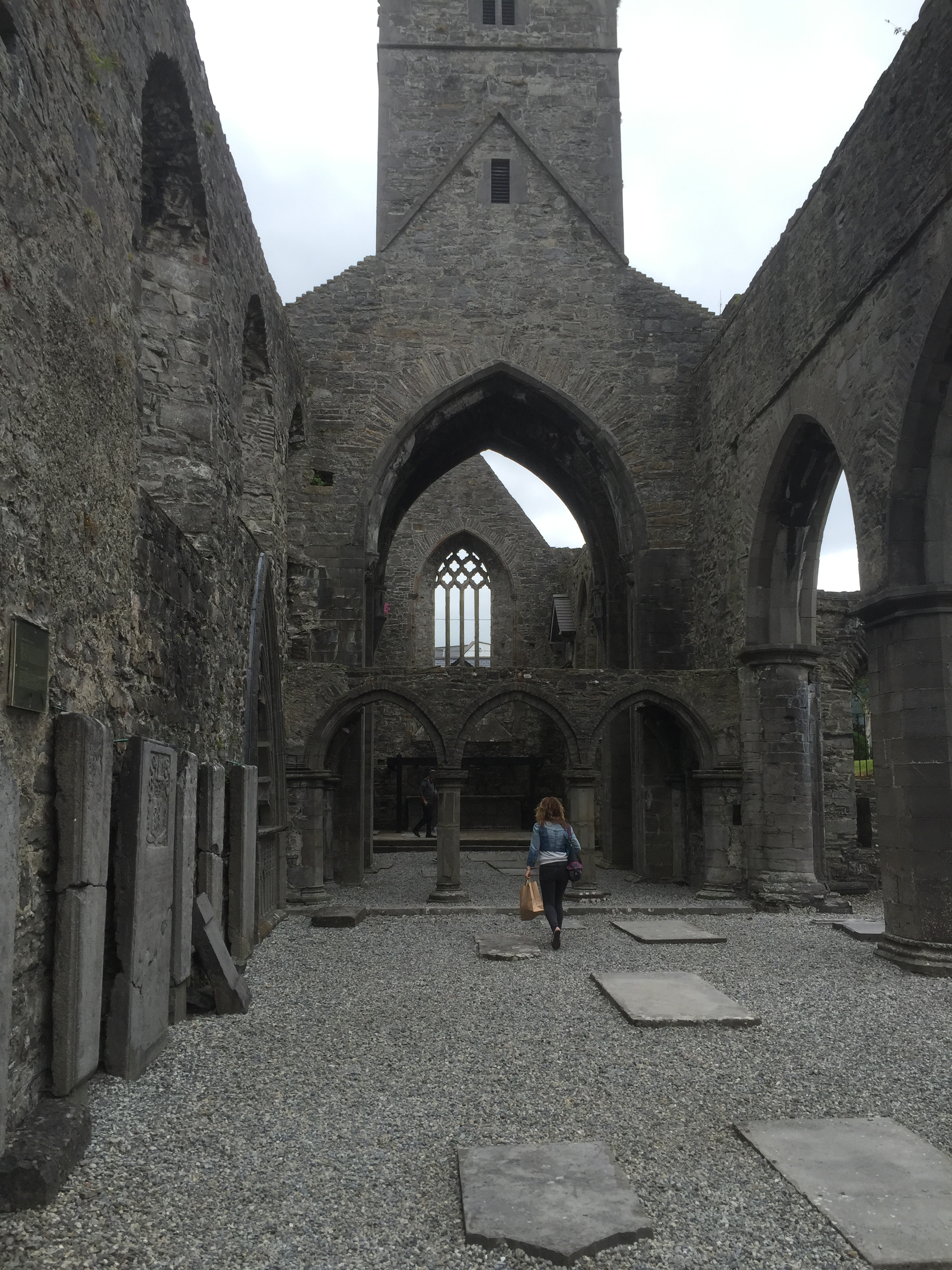
View from the nave to the choir. The reconstructed rood screen is in the centre.

The tower is another 15th-century addition. It is thick-walled and square. It is placed on the main axis of the church just east of the rood screen and suspended over the church by the means of two lofty pointed and profiled arches forming an archway or tunnel that connects the two parts of the church. The underside of the tower is closed by a ribbed and groined fan vault. The tower has a door on its north side that was reached over the roof. With the roof gone, the tower has become inaccessible. The tower resembles those of Kilcrea Friary, Muckross Abbey, Quin Abbey, and Rosserk Friary, but none of those is as daringly suspended.

The church's east end is square. The terminal wall holds a large late-Gothic window divided into four lights by mullions. Its head is filled with reticular tracery. This window must have replaced one or several Romanesque windows in the 15th century. In front of this window stands the table of the high altar, the front of which is divided into nine panels decorated with late-gothic cusped arches and foliage in relief. This altar also dates from the Late Gothic.

The nave has the same width as the choir. Its western façade has been destroyed so that the western end of the church stands open. On the southern side the nave was accompanied by an aisle and a one-armed transept (or lateral chapel). Both are later additions. The aisle has been entirely demolished and the transept partially, so that the arcade, consisting of three pointed arches supported by octagonal pillars, is exposed. The transept once held two altars. The naves of Kilcrea Friary, Muckross Abbey, Quin Abbey, and Rosserk Friary have similar one-armed transepts.

The cloister lies to the north of the church as is also the case at Kilcrea Friary, Moyne Abbey, Muckross Abbey, Quin Abbey, and Rosserk Friary. The cloister's southern walk runs along the northern wall of the church's nave. Only three sides of the cloister remain standing; the western side has been demolished. The cloister walk is covered with rubble barrel vaults. Its arcades are supported by slender pillars reminiscent of double columns. The arches of the arcades and the barrel vaults are slightly pointed. The cloisters of Moyne Abbey and Quin Abbey have similar pillars and vaults. Despite its Romanesque appearance the cloister is attributed to the 15th century.

The sacristy, vestry, and chapter room are in the ground floor of the east range. Excepted the western extension of the chapter room, they are part of the 13th-century core of the abbey. They are covered with rubble barrel vaults similar to those of the cloister. The refectory occupied the first floor of the north range. Only its southern wall above the arcade of the cloister is preserved. From this wall protrudes a ruined oriel window giving light to the reader's desk where a friar would read aloud from the scriptures during mealtimes.

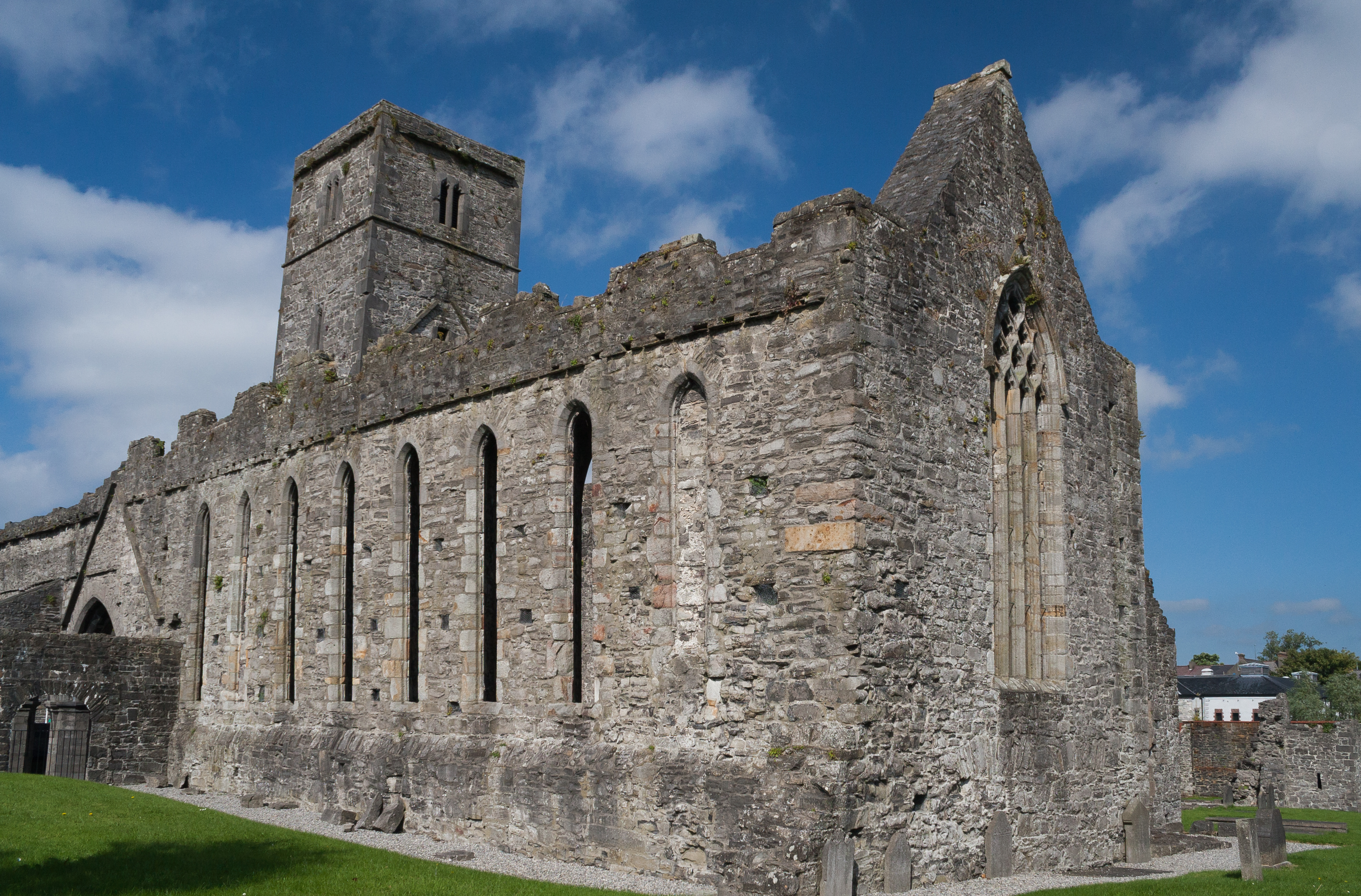
The choir and tower from the south-east.

== Monuments ==
The church contains two noteworthy funeral monuments: the "O'Craian altar tomb" and the mural in remembrance of "Sir Donogh O'Connor Sligo". O'Craian's tomb is the oldest surviving monument in the church. Its Latin inscription dates it from 1506 and states that it is the tomb of Cormac O'Craian (or Crean) and his wife Johanna, daughter of Ennis (or Magennis). It fills a niche in the northern wall of the nave next to the rood screen. It consists of a stone table, similar to the altar in the choir, and a canopy consisting of a high pointed arch with tracery. The style is late Gothic.

The O'Connor mural is on the wall of the choir to the right of the altar. It shows reliefs of O'Connor and his wife kneeling in prayer in an architectural frame, decorated with heraldic and religious motives. Sir Donogh O'Connor obtained the letter from Queen Elizabeth that saved the abbey from dissolution, mentioned above. He died in 1609. His wife, Eleanor Butler, daughter of Lord Dunboyne, erected the monument in 1624 in a late Renaissance style. Before O'Connor she had been married to Gerald FitzGerald, 14th Earl of Desmond, who was killed in 1583.

== In popular culture ==
Sligo Abbey appears in two short stories by William Butler Yeats: The Crucifixion of the Outcast and The Curse of the Fires and of the Shadows. In both stories, the head of the monastery is called the abbot. It is also the subject of what is possibly the oldest surviving painting of any building in Ireland.

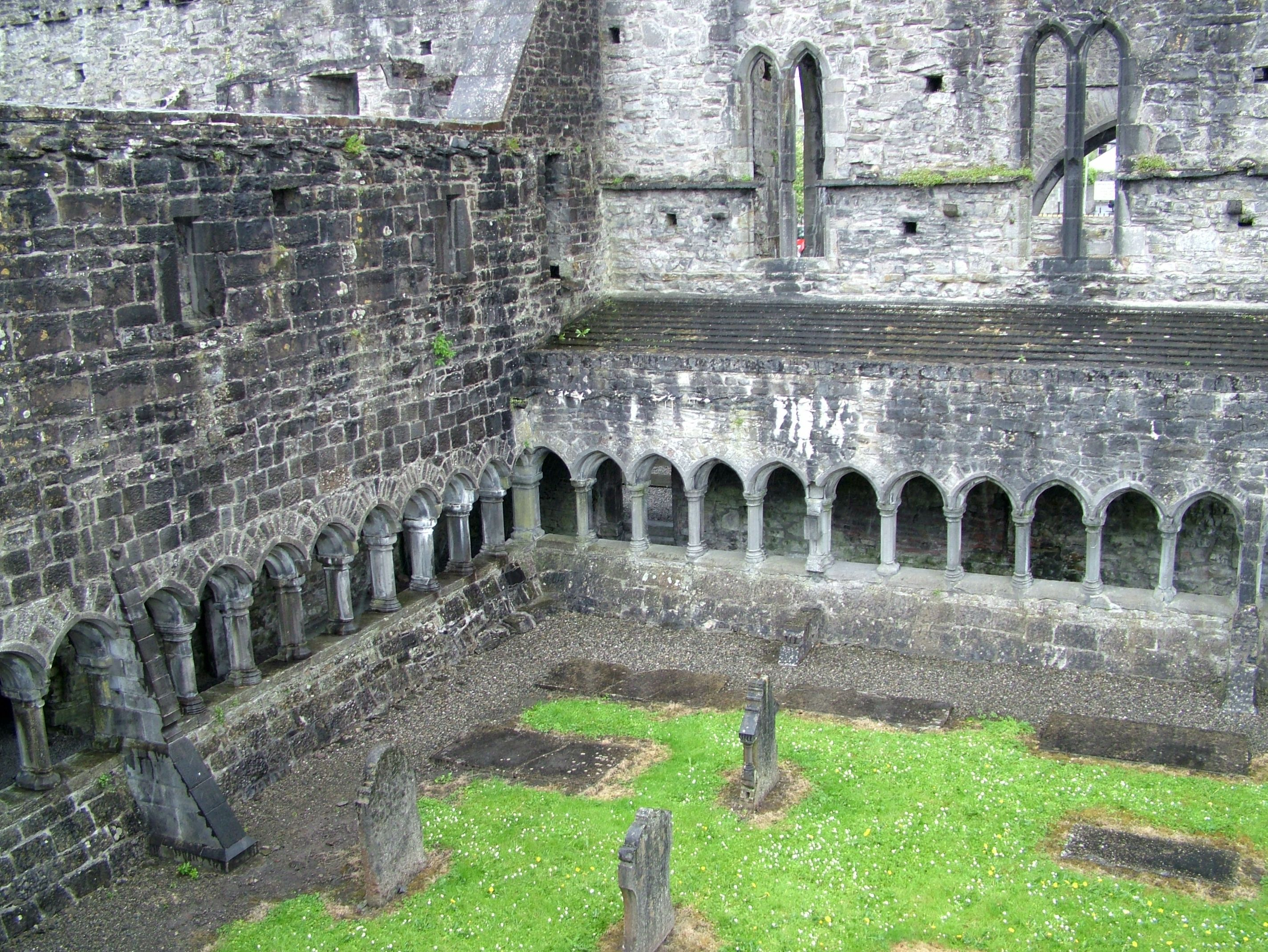
The southern and the eastern arcades of the cloister

== See also ==
- List of abbeys and priories in Ireland (County Sligo)
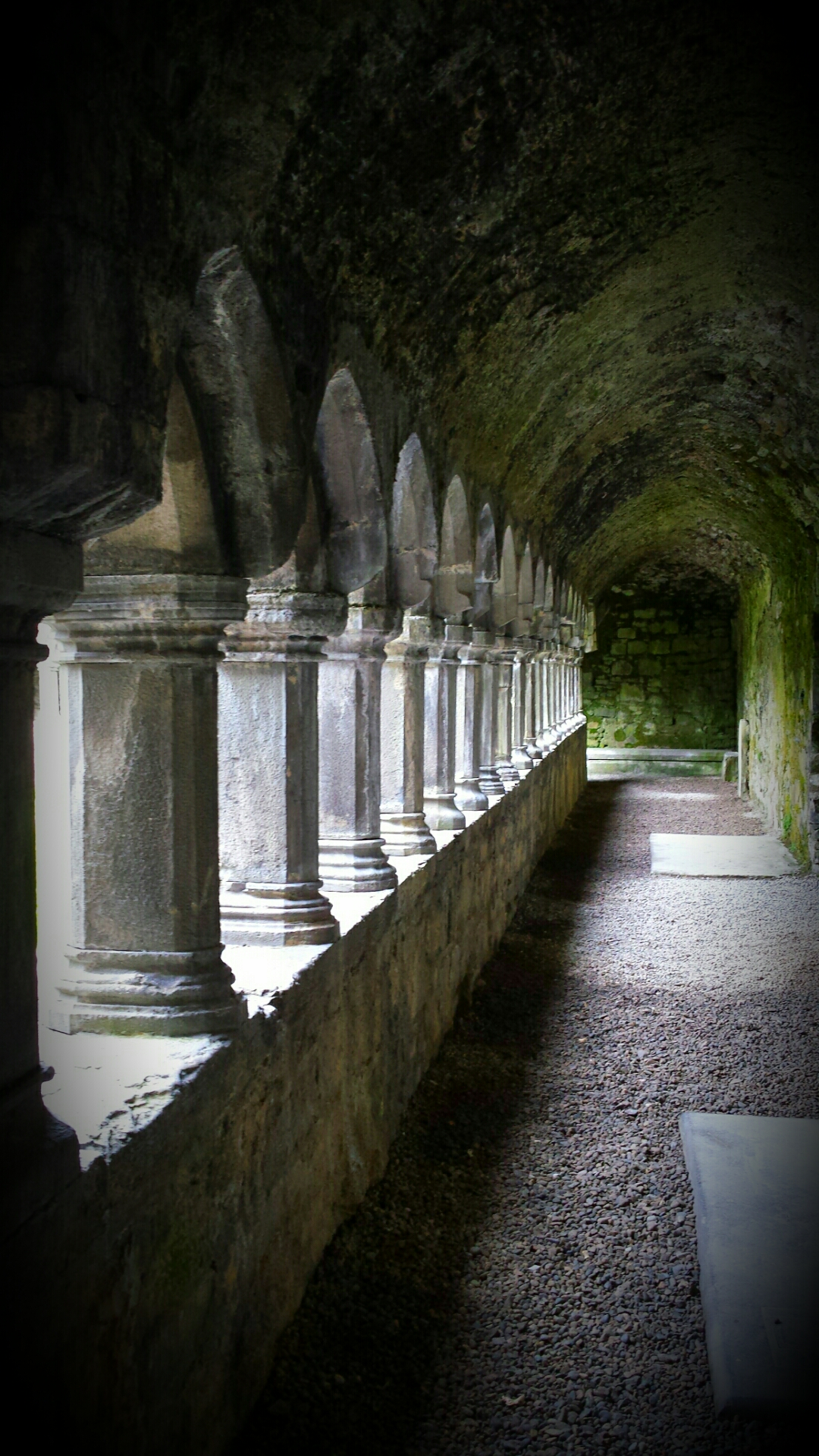
Inside the cloister-walk

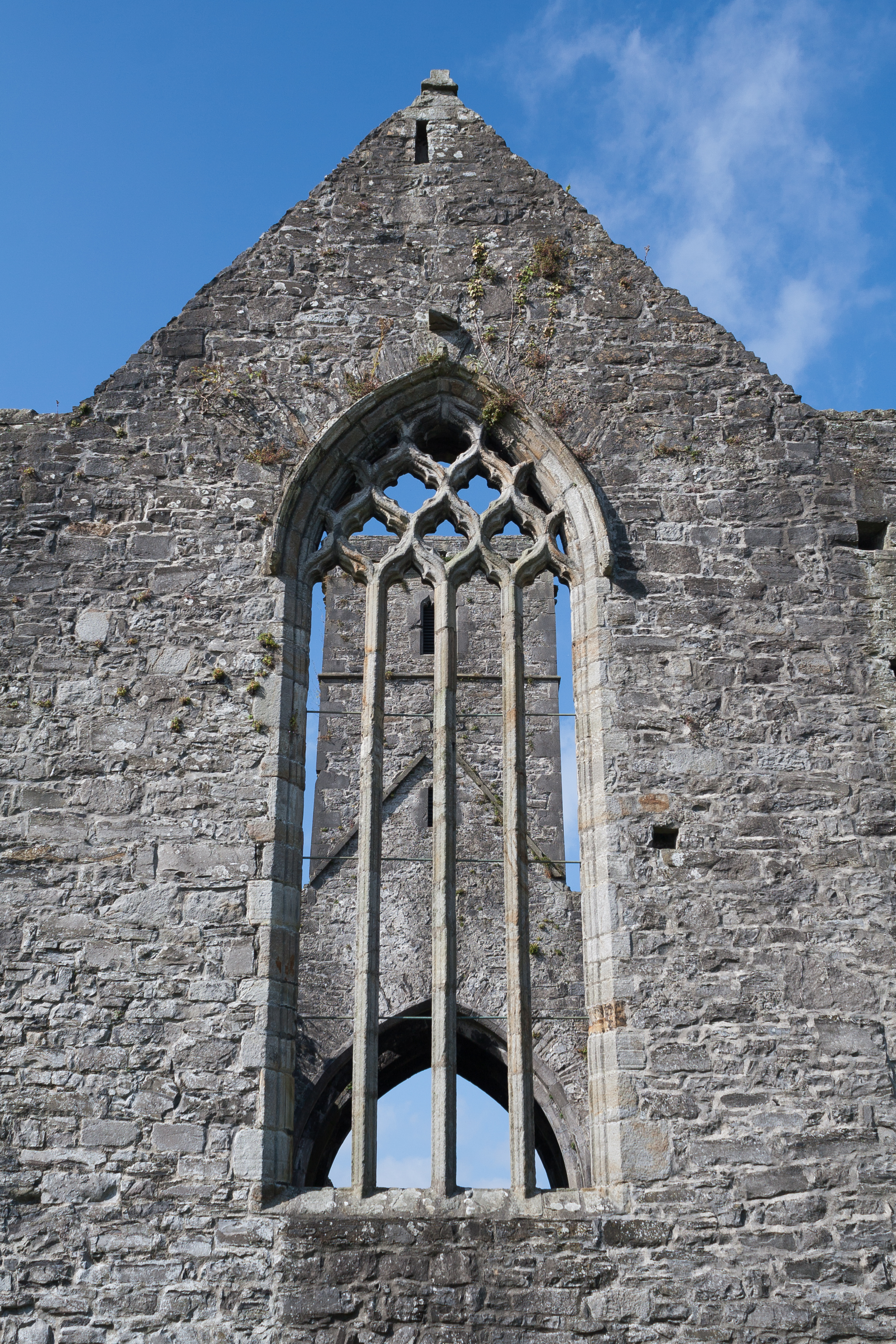
The late Gothic east window

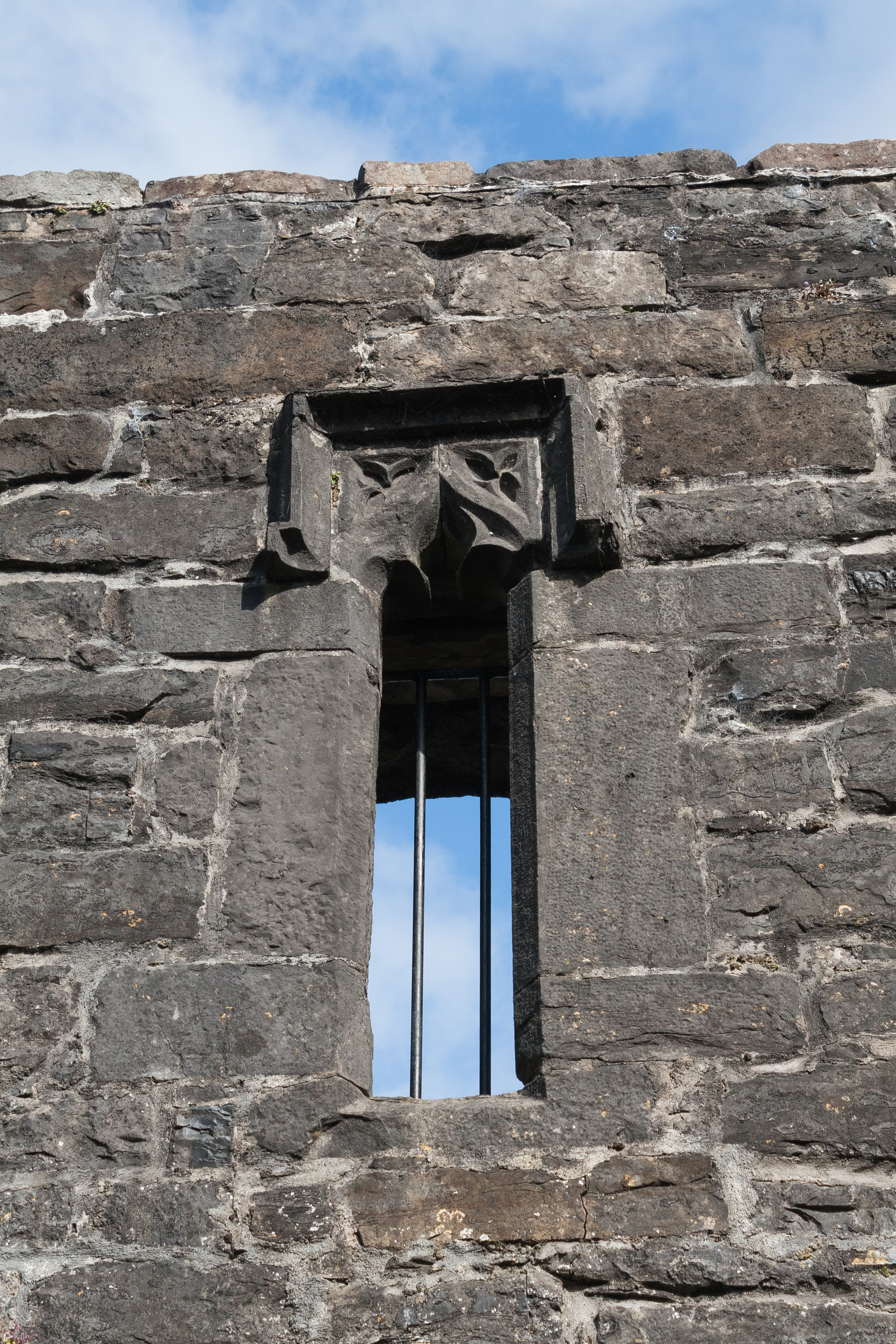
Refectory window above the cloister

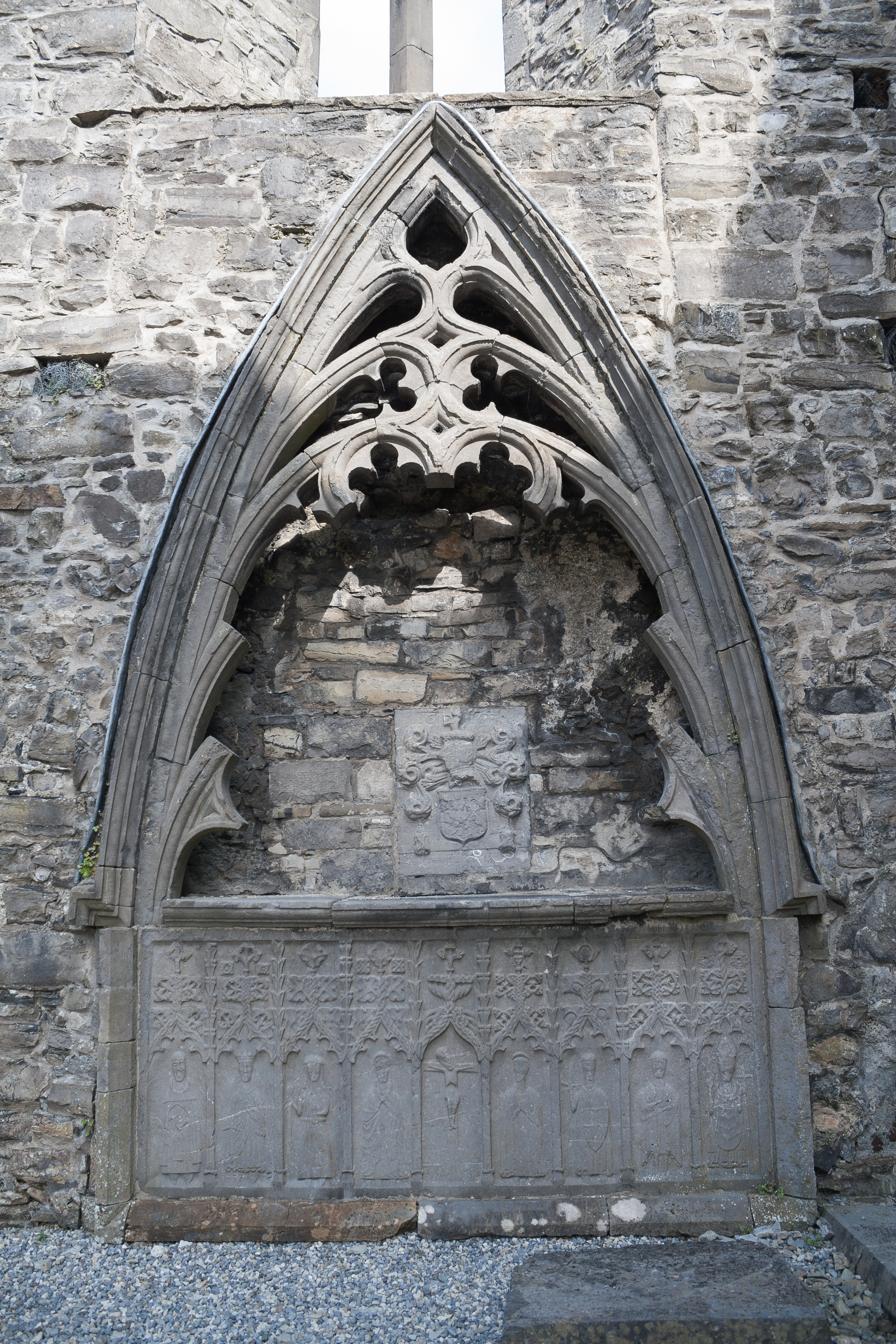
The O'Craian monument

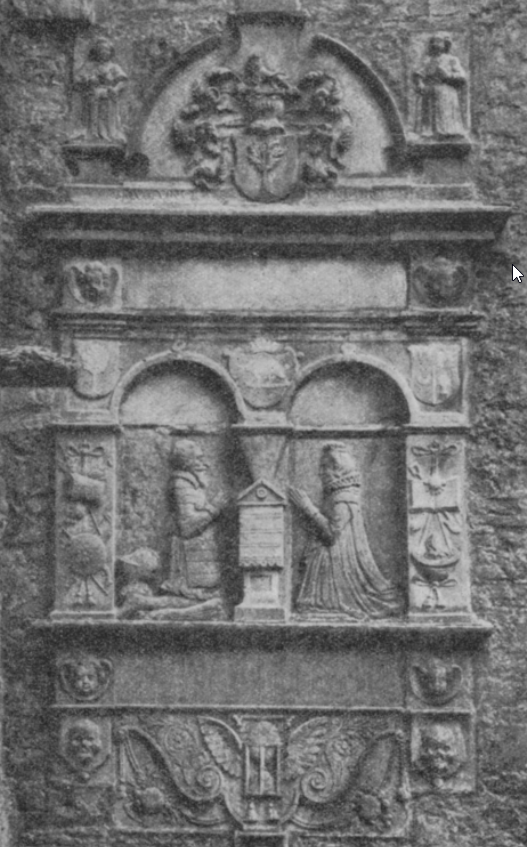
The O'Connor Mural
