= Stackallan House =

Early 18th century house in County Meath, Ireland

- Interactive map of the Stackallan House area
- Former names: Boyne House
- Alternative names: Stackallen House

General information
- Status: Private dwelling house
- Type: House
- Architectural style: Queen Anne
- Location: Stackallan, County Meath, Ireland
- Coordinates: 53.6967511°N 6.6134598°W
- Completed: 1712

Design and construction
- Architect: John Curle
- Developer: Gustavus Hamilton, 1st Viscount Boyne

Stackallan House (originally Boyne House) is an early 18th century unfortified house in Stackallan, County Meath, Ireland.

The house was constructed around 1712 for Gustavus Hamilton, 1st Viscount Boyne and the Queen Anne design has been attributed to John Curle by the architectural historian Christine Casey.

The house is notable for being one of the few surviving early 18th century houses in a classical pre-Georgian style. It is built largely on a square plan with 3 storeys over basement and a steep pitched roof in an almost French style. Stylistically, the house also contains other more northern European influences. The principal west front facade contains 9 bays with a 3 bay break front with the south facade having seven bays also with a 3 bay break front. The house bears some similarities to the nearby Beaulieu House which was constructed nearby around the same time and likely using many of the same tradespeople.

It was built on the banks of the Boyne river in sight of the battlefield of the Battle of the Boyne in which the developer, Gustavus Hamilton commanded a regiment of Williamite soldiers.

In the early 20th century the house was owned by Henry Farnham Burke.

The home was owned by Margaret Heffernan for a period who bought it for IRE £1.75 million in 1993, but sold it on to Martin Naughton, stating that the running costs were too high.

== See also ==
- Beaulieu House and Gardens
