= St George Gore-St George =

Anglo-Irish politician

Sir St George Gore-St George, 5th Baronet (25 June 1722 – 25 September 1746) was an Anglo-Irish politician and baronet.

== Biography ==
Born St George Gore, he was oldest son of Sir Ralph Gore, 4th Baronet and his second wife Elizabeth Ashe, daughter of St George Ashe, Bishop of Clogher. In 1733, he succeeded his father as baronet. He assumed the additional surname of St George to inherit the estates of his maternal grandfather, whose only son had died without issue in 1721. Gore-St George represented County Donegal in the Irish House of Commons from 1741 until his death in 1746. He was also appointed High Sheriff of Fermanagh in 1746.

=== Marriage and succession ===
On 22 September 1743, he married Anne Burton, only daughter of Francis Burton and sister of Francis Conyngham, 2nd Baron Conyngham. Gore-St George died without children, aged only 24, and was succeeded in the baronetcy by his younger brother Ralph. He was buried at Castletown, County Kildare.

Parliament of Ireland
Preceded by George Knox; Henry Hamilton	Member of Parliament for County Donegal; 1741–1746; With: Henry Hamilton 1741–1743; Andrew Knox 1743–1746	Succeeded by Andrew Knox; Sir Ralph Gore, 6th Bt
Baronetage of Ireland
Preceded by Ralph Gore	Baronet (of Magharabeg); 1733–1746	Succeeded by Ralph Gore
