= Sir Ralph Gore, 4th Baronet =

Irish politician (1675–1733)

The Right Honourable Sir Ralph Gore, Bt

Speaker of the Irish House of Commons
- In office 1729–1733
- Monarch: George II
- Preceded by: William Conolly
- Succeeded by: Henry Boyle

Chancellor of the Exchequer of Ireland
- In office 1717–1733
- Monarchs: George I George II
- Preceded by: Philip Savage
- Succeeded by: Henry Boyle

Personal details
- Born: c. 1675
- Died: 23 February 1733
- Party: Whigs
- Spouse(s): Elizabeth Colville; Elizabeth Ashe
- Children: 9, including St George and Ralph
- Education: Trinity College Dublin

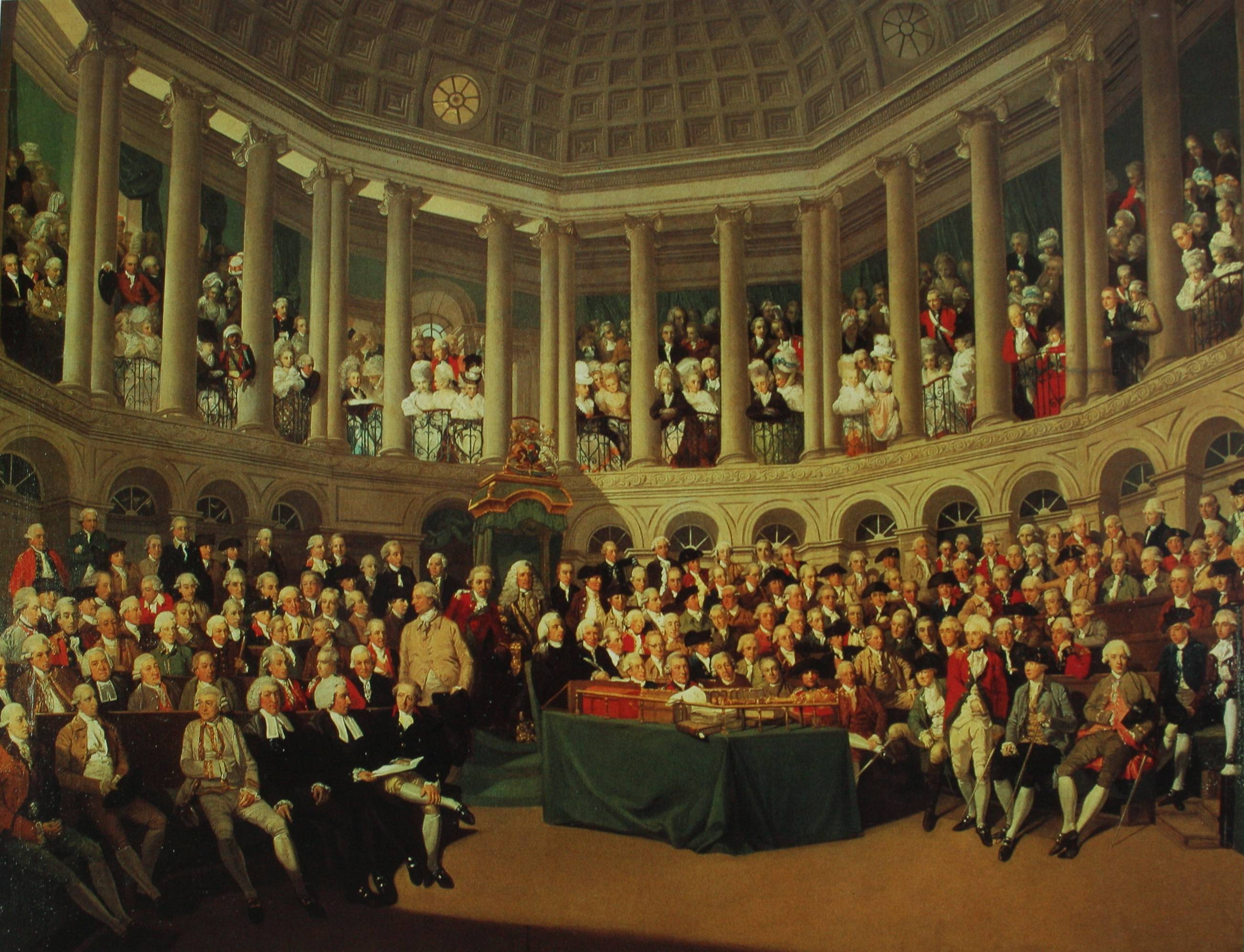
The Irish House of Commons in 1780 by Francis Wheatley

Sir Ralph Gore, 4th Baronet (c. 1675 – 23 February 1733) was an Anglo-Irish Whig politician and baronet, who was Chancellor of the Exchequer of Ireland from 1717 until his death, and concurrently Speaker of the Irish House of Commons from 1729. He is now chiefly remembered for building Belle Isle Castle.

== Early life ==
Gore was the eldest son of Sir William Gore, 3rd Baronet and his wife Hannah Hamilton, daughter and co-heiress of James Hamilton of Manorhamilton and niece of Gustavus Hamilton, 1st Viscount Boyne. Ralph inherited the estate of Manorhamilton from his mother. In 1693 he entered Trinity College Dublin and may have subsequently trained in law at King's Inns.

In 1703 he inherited his father's baronetcy and estates, which included over 7,000 acres in County Fermanagh, where Gore subsequently settled. His grandfather had acquired Belle Island in Lough Erne; Gore then built Belle Isle Castle on the island, which was extended and improved by his son.

He was appointed High Sheriff of Leitrim for 1710.

== Parliamentary career ==
Gore was first elected to the Irish House of Commons as a member of parliament for Donegal Borough in 1703. He held the seat until 1713, when he was elected to sit for County Donegal on the interest of his kinsman, James Hamilton, 6th Earl of Abercorn. In 1714, he was made a member of the Privy Council of Ireland having supported the Hanoverian succession.

Gore was a supporter of the powerful speaker, William Conolly and it was with Conolly's backing that Gore became Chancellor of the Exchequer of Ireland in 1717. In 1727, he was elected to represent Clogher, a seat he held until his death. When Conolly resigned as speaker in 1729, Gore was elected by the house to replace him.

He served as one of the Lords Justices of Ireland in 1730 and 1732. After becoming ill in January 1733, Gore died the following month and was buried in Christ Church Cathedral, Dublin.

== Family ==
He married firstly Elizabeth Colville, daughter of Sir Robert Colville of Newtown House, Newtownards; Elizabeth was most likely the child of Colville's third wife Rose Leslie. Gore married secondly, Elizabeth Ashe, daughter of St George Ashe, Bishop of Clogher and his wife (and distant cousin) Jane St George, daughter of Sir George St George of Dunmore, County Galway and Elizabeth Hannay. By his first wife, he had two daughters, including Rose, who married Anthony Malone, Chancellor of the Irish Exchequer, but had no issue. By his second wife, he had seven children, including St George Gore-St George, who succeeded to the baronetcy, but died young without issue, Ralph Gore, 1st Earl of Ross, Richard, father of Sir Ralph Gore, 7th baronet, and Elizabeth, who married James Daly and had issue, including the High Court judge St George Daly and the politician Denis Daly.

Parliament of Ireland
Preceded by William Gore; William Conolly	Member of Parliament for Donegal Borough; 1703–1713; With: Richard Jones	Succeeded by George Macartney; Sir Arthur Gore, 2nd Bt
Preceded by Frederick Hamilton; Gustavus Hamilton	Member of Parliament for County Donegal; 1713–1727; With: Frederick Hamilton 1713–1716; Hon. Gustavus Hamilton 1716–1727	Succeeded by Hon. Gustavus Hamilton; Alexander Montgomery
Preceded by Richard St George; James Coghill	Member of Parliament for Clogher; 1727–1733; With: Silvester Cross 1727–1731; Walter Carey 1731–1733	Succeeded by Richard Vincent; Walter Carey
Political offices
Preceded by Philip Savage	Chancellor of the Exchequer of Ireland; 1717–1733	Succeeded by Henry Boyle
Preceded by William Conolly	Speaker of the Irish House of Commons; 1729–1733	Succeeded by Henry Boyle
Baronetage of Ireland
Preceded by William Gore	Baronet (of Magherabegg); 1703–1733	Succeeded by St George Gore-St George
