= Frederick Hamilton (Donegal politician) =

Irish MP and heir apparent to the 1st Viscount Boyne (died 1715)

- Died: 13 December 1715
- Spouse: Sophia Hamilton
- Issue Detail: Gustavus & others
- Father: Gustavus, 1st Viscount Boyne
- Mother: Elizabeth Brooke

The Right Honourable Frederick Hamilton (c. 1663 – 1715) was an Irish politician who represented County Donegal in three Irish parliaments. He was also heir apparent to his father, Gustavus Hamilton, 1st Viscount Boyne. He predeceased him but his son succeeded as the 3rd viscount.

== Birth and origins ==
Family tree

Frederick Hamilton with wife, parents and other selected relatives. (Note: This family tree is partly derived from the Abercorn pedigree pictured in Cokayne. Also see the lists of siblings and children in the text.)

Frederick; 1590–1647; Soldier	Sidney; Vaughan
James of Manor- hamilton d. 1652	Gustavus; 1st Viscount; 1642–1723	Elizabeth; Brooke d. 1721
Frederick c. 1663 – 1715 d.v.p.*	Sophia; Hamilton d. 1748	Gustavus c. 1685 – 1735; Politician
Gustavus; 2nd Viscount; 1710–1746	Frederick; 3rd Viscount; 1710–1746	Richard; 4th Viscount; 1724–1789

Legend

XXX	Subject of the article	XXX	Viscounts; Boyne

*d.v.p. = predeceased his father (decessit vita patris)

Frederick was born before 1686 in Ireland. (Note: He was born before 1786 as he must have been at least 21 when elected MP in 1707.) He was the eldest son of Gustavus Hamilton and his wife Elizabeth Brooke. His father would in 1715 be ennobled as Baron Stackallan and in 1717 advanced to Viscount Boyne. His father's family was a Protestant cadet branch of the House of Hamilton.

Frederick's mother was the eldest daughter of Sir Henry Brooke and his second wife, Anne St George. Brooke was knight of Brookeborough, County Fermanagh, and governor of Donegal Castle. Frederick had two brothers and one sister, who are listed in his father's article.

== First term as MP ==
During the 1st Irish Parliament of Queen Anne (21 September 1703 – 6 May 1713), Hamilton became a member of parliament (MP) by winning the 1707 by-election for one of the two seats for County Donegal. This by-election resulted from the death of the incumbent Henry Conyngham, in January 1706 in the Battle of St Estevan of the War of the Spanish Succession (1701–1714). Hamilton's father already held the other of the two seats of the constituency.

== Marriage and children ==
On 1 September 1707, Hamilton married Sophia Hamilton, daughter of James Hamilton of Tollymore, near Newcastle, County Down, and sister of James Hamilton, 1st Earl of Clanbrassil of the second creation.

Frederick and Sophia had two sons:

1. Gustavus (1710–1746), succeeded his grandfather as the 2nd Viscount Boyne
2. James (died 1740), a lieutenant in the navy

—and two daughters:

1. Anne (born 1712), died young
2. Elizabeth (born 1715), died young

== Vice-admiral of Ulster ==
In 1710 Hamilton became vice-admiral of Ulster when his father passed this office to him. Hamilton then held it until his death in 1710 when it reverted to his father. This office was a sine cure as Ireland had no navy.

== Second term as MP ==
Hamilton was again elected as MP for County Donegal in the Irish general elections held in 1713 for the second Irish parliament of Queen Anne (1713–1714). This parliament was dissolved by the queen's death.

== Third term as MP ==
On 3 October 1715 Hamilton was sworn of the Irish Privy Council. In November 1715 he was elected for a last time as MP, again for County Donegal, in the general election for the only Irish parliament of King George I. That parliament lasted from 12 November 1715 to 11 June 1727, but Frederick died on 10 December 1715, after not even a month's service. He was replaced by his younger brother Gustavus.

== Death, succession, and timeline ==
Hamilton died on 10 December 1715, predeceasing his father, who would die in 1723, and his mother, who would die in 1721. At the time of Frederick's death his father had just been ennobled as Baron Stackallan and was not yet Viscount Boyne. Hamilton therefore was an heir apparent without a courtesy title as his father had no subsidiary title. His father was succeeded by Frederick's son Gustavus as the 2nd Viscount Boyne.

Timeline
As his birth date is uncertain, so are all his ages.
Age	Date	Event
0	1686, estimate	Born in Ireland.
2–3	1689, 13 Feb	Accession of William and Mary, succeeding King James II
15–16	1702, 8 Mar	Accession of Queen Anne, succeeding King William III
20–21	1707	Elected as MP for County Donegal.
20–21	1707, 1 Sep	Married Sophia Hamilton, sister of the Earl of Clanbrassil.
26–27	1713	Re-elected as MP for County Donegal.
27–28	1714, 1 Aug	Accession of King George I, succeeding Queen Anne
26–27	1715	Re-elected as MP for County Donegal.
28–29	1715, 20 Oct	Father created Baron Hamilton of Stackallan.
28–29	1715, 10 Dec	Died.

== See also ==
- List of parliaments of Ireland

== Notes and references ==
=== Sources ===
- Burke, Bernard; Burke, Ashworth Peter (1915). A Genealogical and Heraldic History of the Peerage and Baronetage, the Privy Council, Knightage and Companionage (77th ed.). London: Harrison. OCLC 1155471554. (for Boyne)
- Cokayne, George Edward (1910). Gibbs, Vicary (ed.). The complete peerage of England, Scotland, Ireland, Great Britain and the United Kingdom, extant, extinct, or dormant. Vol. I (2nd ed.). London: St Catherine Press. OCLC 228661424. – Ab-Adam to Basing (for Family tree)
- Cokayne, George Edward (1912). Gibbs, Vicary (ed.). The complete peerage of England, Scotland, Ireland, Great Britain and the United Kingdom, extant, extinct, or dormant. Vol. II (2nd ed.). London: St Catherine Press. OCLC 228661424. – Bass to Canning (for Boyne)
- Dalton, Charles (1896). English Army Lists and Commission Registers, 1661 – 1714. Vol. III. London: Eyre & Spottiswoode. OCLC 1044660281. – 1689 to 1694
- Debrett, John (1828). Peerage of the United Kingdom of Great Britain and Ireland. Vol. II (17th ed.). London: F. C. and J. Rivington. OCLC 54499602. – Scotland and Ireland
- Fryde, Edmund Boleslaw; Greenway, D. E.; Porter, S.; Roy, I., eds. (1986). Handbook of British Chronology. Royal Historical Society Guides and Handbooks, No. 2 (3rd ed.). London: Offices of the Royal Historical Society. ISBN 0-86193-106-8. – (for timeline)
- House of Commons (1878). Return. Members of Parliament – Part II. Parliaments of Great Britain, 1705–1796. Parliaments of the United Kingdom, 1801–1874. Parliaments and Conventions of the Estates of Scotland, 1357–1707. Parliaments of Ireland, 1599–1800. London: His/Her Majesty's Stationery Office. OCLC 13112546. (for MP of County Donegal)
- Lodge, John (1789). Archdall, Mervyn (ed.). The Peerage of Ireland or, A Genealogical History of the Present Nobility of that Kingdom. Vol. V. Dublin: James Moore. OCLC 264906028. – Viscounts (for Boyne)

Parliament of Ireland
Preceded by Henry Conyngham; Gustavus Hamilton	Member of Parliament for County Donegal; 1707–1715; With: Gustavus Hamilton 1707–1713; Sir Ralph Gore, 4th Bt 1713–1715	Succeeded by Hon. Gustavus Hamilton; Sir Ralph Gore, 4th Bt
Military offices
Preceded by Gustavus Hamilton	Vice-Admiral of Ulster; 1710–1715	Succeeded by Gustavus Hamilton
