= Sir John Vaughan (governor) =

Welsh-born Irish soldier (d. 1643)

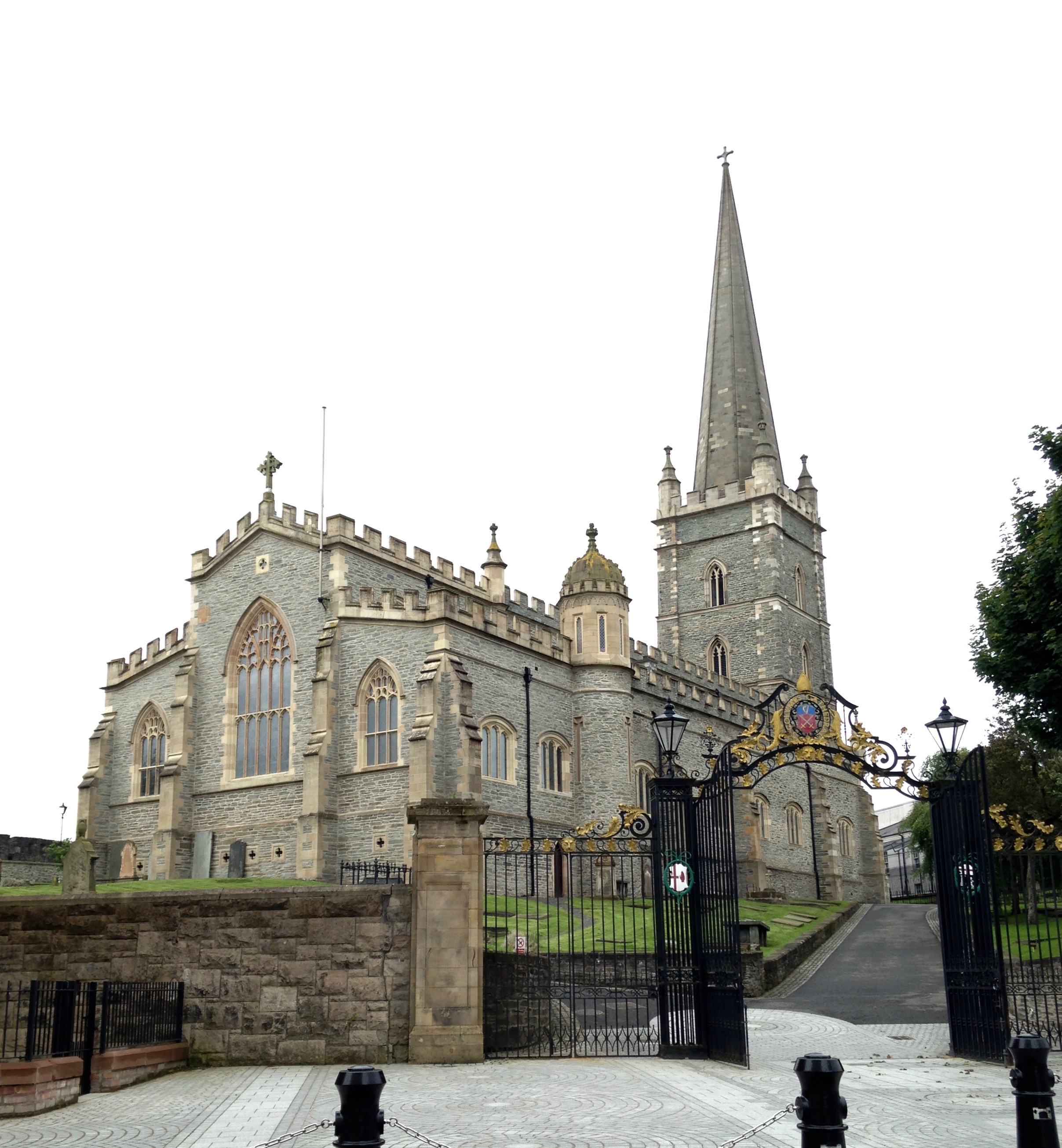
- St Columb's Cathedral, built under Vaughan's supervision
- Born: c.1560s possibly Breconshire or Montgomeryshire
- Died: 1643; Derry
- Military career
- Allegiance: Kingdom of Ireland
- Branch: Infantry
- Service years: c1599-1643
- Rank: Military Governor of Londonderry and Culmore (1611-43)
- Conflicts: Nine Years' War; O'Doherty's rebellion Irish Rebellion of 1641

Sir John Vaughan (died 1643) was a Welsh-born soldier and administrator who settled in Ireland during the Plantation of Ulster, and is most remembered for his long association with the city of Derry. He held the post of Governor of Londonderry and Culmore from 1611 until his death; he was also twice MP for County Donegal.

== Life ==
Relatively little is known of Vaughan's background. He came to Ireland in 1599 as a company commander with Henry Docwra and was granted land in County Donegal. There were family links between many of the early planters and it has been suggested that Vaughan was a relative of Docwra's wife; she was a granddaughter of the MP John Vaughan of Sutton, and descendant of a Breconshire gentry family, the Vaughans of Porthaml.

Vaughan was a survivor of the 1608 sack of Derry during O'Doherty's rebellion. He was made military governor of the town in 1611, repairing the fortifications originally built by Docwra, and was knighted in 1615. He also served as the town's mayor twice, and has been described as "the most outstanding figure in Derry for thirty-five years [...] a permanent element in the government of the town".

As governor he was responsible for building many of the town's significant structures, notably Derry city walls and St Columb's Cathedral, completed under his supervision in 1633. Vaughan was responsible for organising the defence of Derry during the 1641 rebellion and the early part of the Confederate Wars, but died in 1643 and was succeeded as governor by Robert Stewart.

His only child, a daughter Sidney Vaughan, married Sir Frederick Hamilton; the Royalist soldier Sir William Vaughan was probably a nephew.

== Sources ==
- Scott, B.G (2011). "Plans and Economies: defending the Plantation city of Londonderry". Journal of Irish Archaeology. 20.
- Snow, Vernon F.; Young, Anne Steele, eds. (1982). The Private Journals of the Long Parliament: 7 March to 1 June 1642. New Haven and London: Yale University Press. ISBN 9780300036046.
- Tottenham, H. L. (1868). "Vaughan:Dockwra". Notes and Queries. 1 (Fourth Series).
- Walker, Simon (2000). Historic Ulster Churches. Queen's University Belfast. ISBN 9780853897675.
