= Gustavus Hamilton, 2nd Viscount Boyne =

Irish politician (1710–1746)

Gustavus Hamilton
- Viscount Boyne
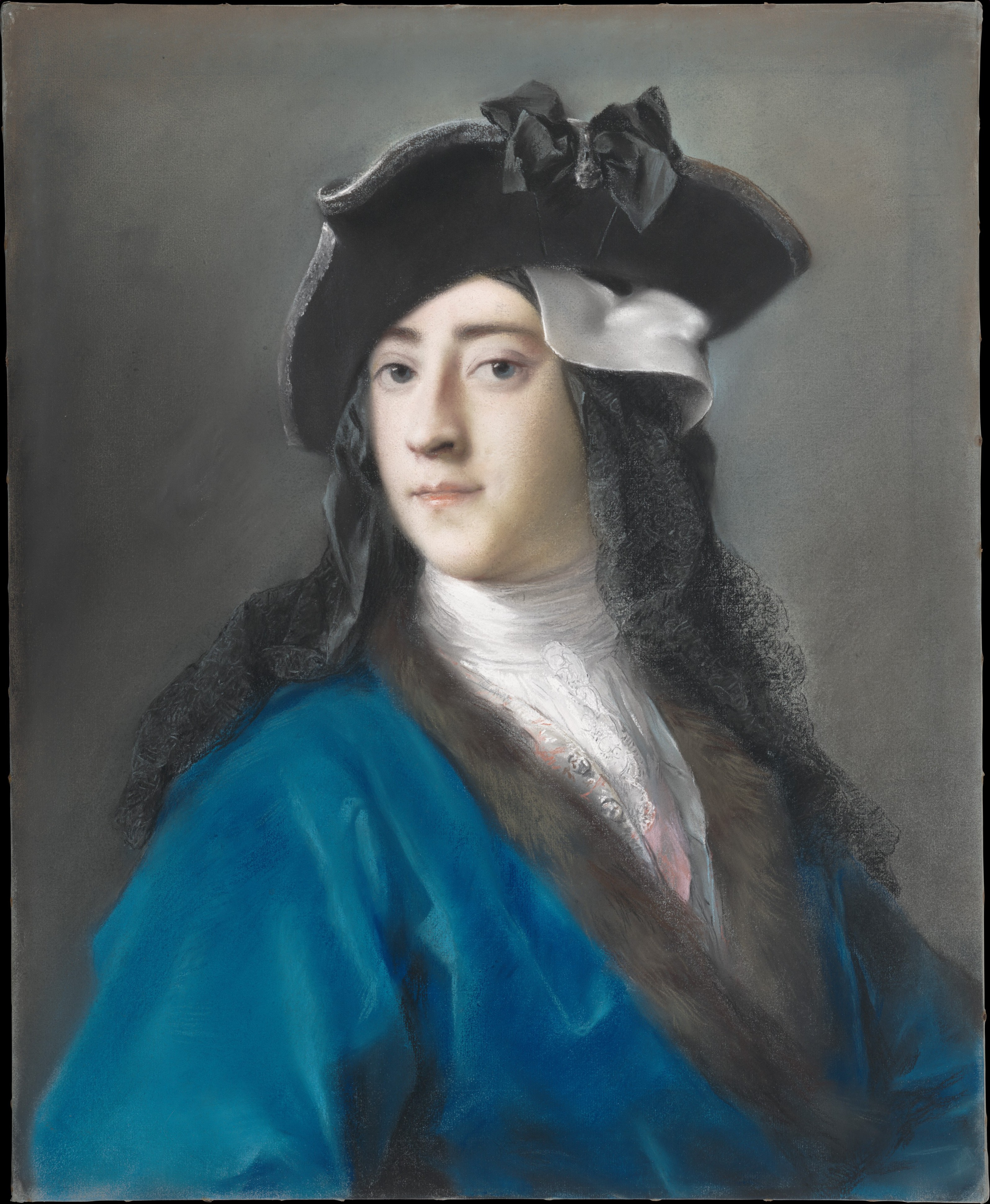
- Detail from the portrait below
- Tenure: 1723–1746
- Predecessor: Gustavus, 1st Viscount Boyne
- Successor: Frederick, 3rd Viscount Boyne
- Born: 1710
- Died: 18 April 1746 (aged 35–36)
- Father: Frederick Hamilton
- Mother: Sophia Hamilton

Gustavus Hamilton, 2nd Viscount Boyne PC (Ire) (1710–1746) was an Irish politician and an enthusiastic admirer of Italy and the Carnival of Venice.

== Birth and origins ==
Family tree

Gustavus Hamilton with parents, and other selected relatives. (Note: This family tree is partly derived from the Abercorn pedigree pictured in Cokayne. Also see the lists of siblings and in the text.) He never married.

Gustavus; 1st Viscount; 1642–1723	Elizabeth; Brooke d. 1721
Frederick c. 1663 – 1715 d.v.p.*	Sophia; Hamilton d. 1748	Gustavus c. 1685 – 1735	Dorothea; Bellew
Gustavus; 2nd Viscount; 1710–1746	Frederick; 3rd Viscount; 1718–1772	Richard; 4th Viscount; 1724–1789
Gustavus; 5th Viscount; 1749–1816	Martha; Somerville

Legend

XXX	Subject of the article	XXX	Viscounts; Boyne

*d.v.p. = predeceased his father (decessit vita patris)

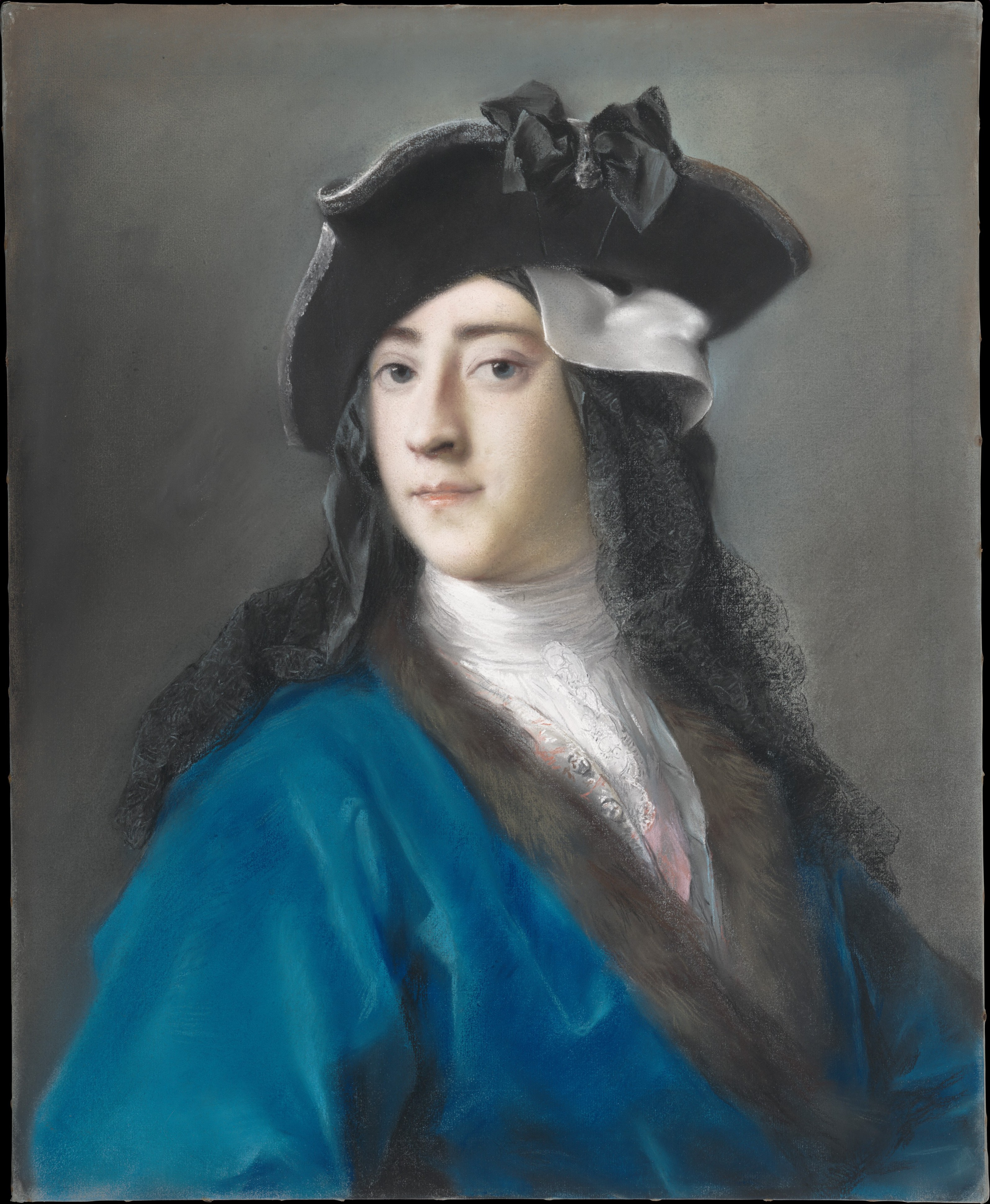
Gustavus Hamilton, 2nd Viscount Boyne with a bauta masque on his ear, pastel by Rosalba Carriera about 1730.

Gustavus was born in 1710, probably in Ireland. He was the eldest son of Frederick Hamilton and his wife Sophia Hamilton. His grandfather was Major-General Gustavus Hamilton who would soon become Viscount Boyne. His father was the eldest son and heir apparent but would predecease his grandfather. His paternal family was a Protestant cadet branch of the Catholic Earls of Abercorns, who in turn descended from the Scottish Clan Hamilton.

Gustavus's mother was a daughter of James Hamilton of Tollymore, near Newcastle, County Down and sister of James Hamilton, 1st Earl of Clanbrassil. Gustavus's parents had married on 1 September 1707. He was one of four siblings, who are listed in his father's article.

== Honours and offices ==
On 20 October 1715 King George I ennobled his grandfather as Baron Stackallan. His father was from then on styled the Honourable Frederick Hamilton, being the son of a peer. His father enjoyed this honour for less than two months as he unexpectedly died on 10 December 1715. This made young Gustavus heir apparent at the age of five. After his father's death, his mother took him to London and sent him to Westminster School. On 20 August 1717 his grandfather was advanced to Viscount Boyne and young Gustavus was styled Baron Hamilton of Stackallan as courtesy title. In 1723, aged 13, he succeeded his grandfather as 2nd Viscount Boyne. In 1736, Boyne, as he now was, was sworn of the Privy Council of Ireland. In 1737, he was appointed a commissioner of the Irish Revenue, a post that he would hold until his death in 1746.

His Irish viscountcy did not disqualify him from sitting in the British House of Commons. In 1736 he won the by-election to succeeded William Fortescue in one of the two seats of Newport, Isle of Wight, of the 8th Parliament of Great Britain and sat as Member of Parliament for this constituency until the end of the parliament in 1741.

== Venice ==
From January to March 1730, Boyne and Edward Walpole were in Venice enjoying the pleasures of the carnival. Immediately after their trip, Walpole, the younger son of Sir Robert Walpole, the prime minister of Great Britain, entered Parliament as Member for Lostwithiel in a by-election on 29 April 1730, following the death of Sir Edward Knatchbull. Boyne, however, travelled to Venice again the following winter.

In 1734, Boyne was a founder-member of the Society of Dilettanti, a group of Englishmen who had made their Grand Tour and met to discuss, and to exert their influence on, matters of taste in London. Other members of the Society included his "particular friend, the notorious rake" Francis Dashwood, 11th Baron le Despencer.

== Death and timeline ==
Boyne died unmarried on 18 or 20 April 1746 and was buried at Stackallen. His cousin Frederick Hamilton succeeded to the viscountcy.

Timeline
Age	Date	Event
0	1710	Born in Ireland.
3–4	1714, 1 Aug	Accession of King George I, succeeding Queen Anne
4–5	1715, 20 Oct	Grandfather created Baron Hamilton of Stackallan.
4–5	1715, 10 Dec	Father died; he became heir apparent.
6–7	1717, 20 Aug	Grandfather created Viscount Boyne. He was styled Baron Hamilton of Stackallen.
12–13	1723, 16 Sep	Succeeded his grandfather as 2nd Viscount Boyne.
16–17	1727, 11 Jun	Accession of King George II, succeeding King George I
19–20	1730	Travels to Venice
35–36	1746, 18 Apr	Died

== See also ==
- House of Hamilton, for his father's and mother's family.
- Viscount Boyne, for his title.

== Notes and references ==
=== Sources ===
- Burke, Bernard; Burke, Ashworth P. (1909). A Genealogical and Heraldic History of the Peerage and Baronetage, the Privy Council, Knightage and Companionage (71st ed.). London: Harrison. OCLC 28297274. (for Boyne)
- Cokayne, George Edward (1910). Gibbs, Vicary (ed.). The complete peerage of England, Scotland, Ireland, Great Britain and the United Kingdom, extant, extinct, or dormant. Vol. 1 (2nd ed.). London: St Catherine Press. OCLC 228661424. – Ab-Adam to Basing (for Family tree)
- Cokayne, George Edward (1912). Gibbs, Vicary (ed.). The complete peerage of England, Scotland, Ireland, Great Britain and the United Kingdom, extant, extinct, or dormant. Vol. 2 (2nd ed.). London: St Catherine Press. OCLC 228661424. – Bass to Canning (for Boyne)
- Debrett, John (1828). Peerage of the United Kingdom of Great Britain and Ireland. Vol. 2 (17th ed.). London: F. C. and J. Rivington. OCLC 54499602. – Scotland and Ireland
- Fryde, Edmund Boleslaw; Greenway, D. E.; Porter, S.; Roy, I., eds. (1986). Handbook of British Chronology. Royal Historical Society Guides and Handbooks, No. 2 (3rd ed.). London: Offices of the Royal Historical Society. ISBN 0-86193-106-8. – (for timeline)
- Lodge, John (1789). Archdall, Mervyn (ed.). The Peerage of Ireland or, A Genealogical History of the Present Nobility of that Kingdom. Vol. 5. Dublin: James Moore. OCLC 264906028. – Viscounts (for Boyne)

Parliament of Great Britain
Preceded by William Fortescue; George Huxley	Member of Parliament for Newport (Isle of Wight); 1736–1741; With: George Huxley	Succeeded by Anthony Chute; Monoux Cope
Peerage of Ireland
Preceded by Gustavus Hamilton	Viscount Boyne; 1723–1746	Succeeded by Frederick Hamilton
