= Stackallan =

Civil parish in County Meath, Ireland

Coordinates: 53°42′N 6°37′W

Stackallan (Irish: Stigh Colláin) is a civil parish in County Meath, Ireland.

The area is notable for the presence of Stackallan House, one of the earliest surviving examples of unfortified classical housing in Ireland constructed around 1712.
