= Richard Hamilton, 4th Viscount Boyne =

Irish politician

The Right Honourable The Viscount Boyne

Member of Parliament for Navan
- In office 1755–1761 Serving with Nathaniel Preston
- Preceded by: John Preston; Nathaniel Preston
- Succeeded by: John Preston; Joseph Preston

Personal details
- Born: 24 March 1724
- Died: 30 July 1789 (aged 65)
- Spouse: Georgiana Bury
- Children: 17
- Parent(s): Gustavus Hamilton; Dorothea Bellew
- Relatives: Gustavus Hamilton, 1st Viscount Boyne (grandfather)

Richard Hamilton, 4th Viscount Boyne (24 March 1724 – 30 July 1789) was an Irish peer and politician. After serving in the Royal Navy and Irish House of Commons, he inherited the viscountcy from his brother Frederick Hamilton, 3rd Viscount Boyne in 1772 and died in 1789.

== Early life ==
Hamilton was born on 24 March 1724. He was the younger son of Gustavus Hamilton (second of Gustavus Hamilton, 1st Viscount Boyne), and his wife Dorothea Bellew (a daughter of Richard Bellew, 3rd Baron Bellew of Duleek). His uncles were Frederick Hamilton and Henry Hamilton.

== Career ==
Hamilton joined the Royal Navy, and was promoted to lieutenant on 2 June 1748. Two days after this he was appointed to the 80-gun ship of the line HMS Russell as her third lieutenant, in the Mediterranean Sea.

Hamilton entered the Irish House of Commons in 1755 and sat as Member of Parliament (MP) for Navan until 1761. He was High Sheriff of Meath in 1766. On 8 June 1757 he joined the 74-gun ship of the line HMS Magnanime as her third lieutenant; he served in her until 11 July and did not receive any further appointments in the navy. On 2 January 1772 he succeeded his older brother Frederick Hamilton, 3rd Viscount Boyne as viscount.

== Personal life ==
Hamilton married Georgiana Bury, second daughter of William Bury and his wife Jane Moore. Her maternal grandfather was John Moore, 1st Baron Moore, and her mother was the sister and heiress of Charles Moore, 1st Earl of Charleville. Together, they were the parents of seventeen children, seven sons and ten daughters, including:

- Gustavus Hamilton, 5th Viscount Boyne (1749–1816), who married Martha Somerville, only daughter of Sir Quaile Somerville, 2nd Baronet, in 1773.
- Charles Hamilton (1750–1794), who married Ms. Lister, daughter of Christopher Kirwan Lister, in 1785.
- Catherine Hamilton (1754–1795), who married Hugh Montgomery Lyons of Belhaval on 2 February 1773.
- Sophia Hamilton (b. 1769), who married William John Lowe and, secondly, Rev. Bigoe Henzell, Rector of Kilwahon.
- Anne Hamilton (1771–1828), who married Thomas Craven.

Lord Boyne died on 30 July 1789.

Parliament of Ireland
Preceded by John Preston; Nathaniel Preston	Member of Parliament for Navan; 1755 – 1761; With: Nathaniel Preston	Succeeded by John Preston; Joseph Preston
Peerage of Ireland
Preceded by Frederick Hamilton	Viscount Boyne; 1772 – 1789	Succeeded by Gustavus Hamilton
