= Viscount Boyne =

Title in the Peerage of Ireland

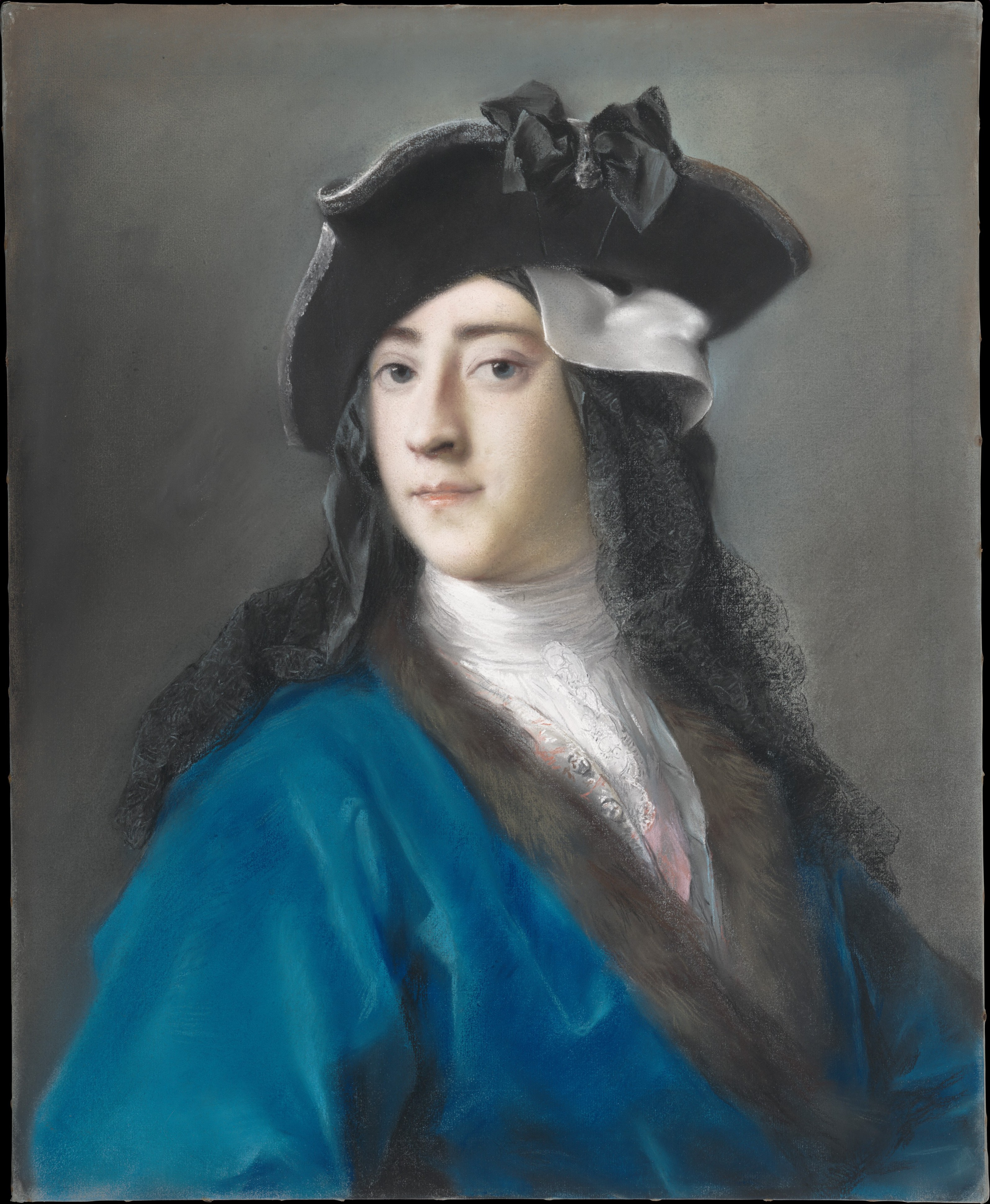
Gustavus Hamilton, 2nd Viscount Boyne

Arms of Gustavus Russell Hamilton-Russell, 8th Viscount Boyne and his descendants: Russell quartering Hamilton, with arms of Russell in the positions of greatest honour

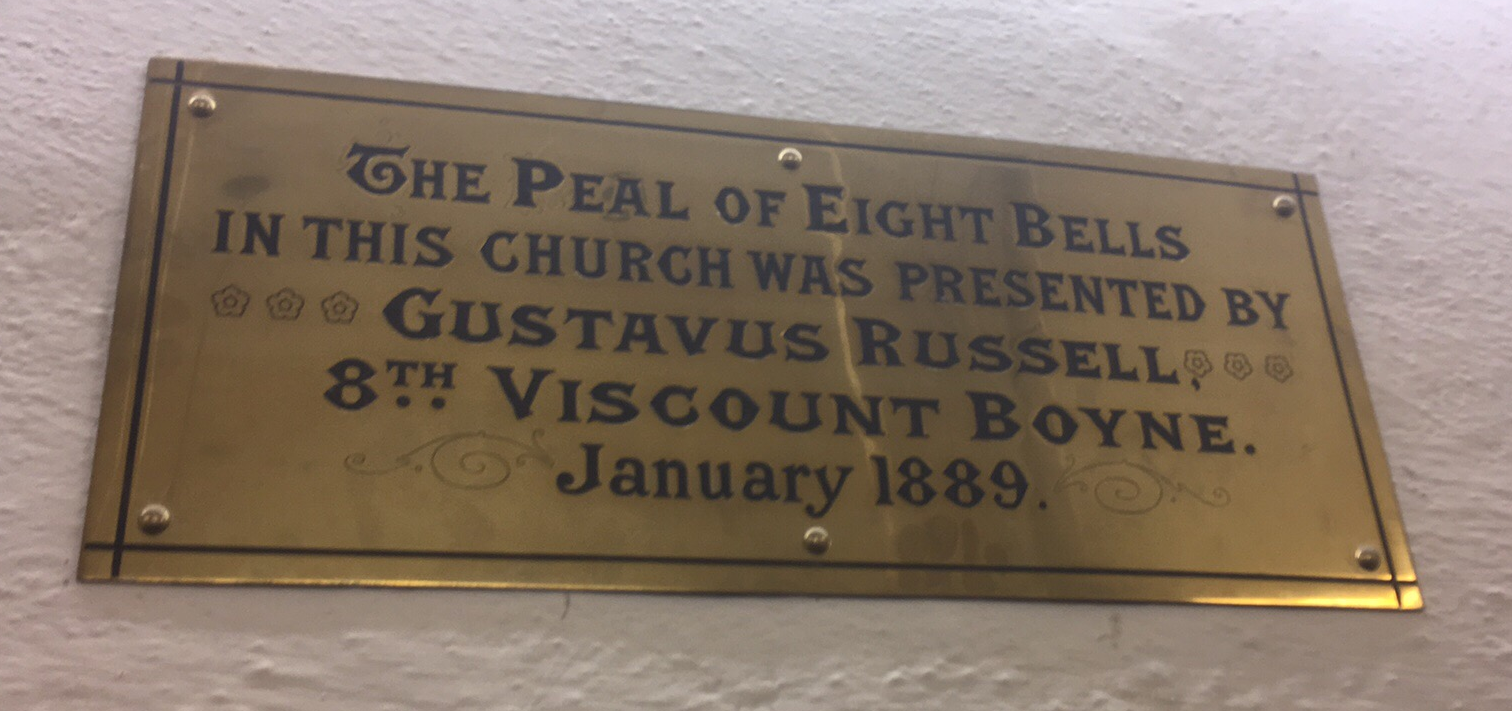
A plaque in the ringing chamber of St. Brandon's Church, Brancepeth, Co. Durham.

Viscount Boyne, in the province of Leinster, is a title in the Peerage of Ireland. It was created in 1717 for the Scottish military commander Gustavus Hamilton, 1st Baron Hamilton of Stackallan. He had already been created Baron Hamilton of Stackallan, in the County of Meath in 1715, also in the Peerage of Ireland. Hamilton was the youngest son of Sir Frederick Hamilton, youngest son of Claud Hamilton, 1st Lord Paisley (from whom the Dukes of Abercorn descend), third son of James Hamilton, 2nd Earl of Arran (from whom the Dukes of Hamilton descend). His grandson, the second Viscount, represented Newport (Isle of Wight) in the House of Commons. His first cousin, the fourth Viscount, sat as a member of the Irish House of Commons for Navan.

His great-grandson, the seventh Viscount, married Emma Maria Russell, sister and heiress of William Russell of Brancepeth Castle, County Durham, children of Matthew Russell of the same, and in 1850 assumed by royal licence the additional surname of Russell. In 1866, he was created Baron Brancepeth, of Brancepeth in the County of Durham, in the Peerage of the United Kingdom. Prior to the passing of the House of Lords Act 1999, the Viscounts Boyne sat in the House of Lords in right of this title. As of 2010 the titles are held by the seventh Viscount's great-great-great-grandson, the eleventh Viscount, who succeeded his father in 1995.

The family seat is at Burwarton House, near Bridgnorth, Shropshire.

== Viscounts Boyne (1717) ==
- Gustavus Hamilton, 1st Viscount Boyne (1642–1723)
  - Hon. Frederick Hamilton (c. 1663–1715)
- Gustavus Hamilton, 2nd Viscount Boyne (1710–1746)
- Frederick Hamilton, 3rd Viscount Boyne (1718–1772)
- Richard Hamilton, 4th Viscount Boyne (1724–1789)
- Gustavus Hamilton, 5th Viscount Boyne (1749–1816)
- Gustavus Hamilton, 6th Viscount Boyne (1777–1855)
- Gustavus Frederick Hamilton-Russell, 7th Viscount Boyne (1798–1872)
- Gustavus Russell Hamilton-Russell, 8th Viscount Boyne (1830–1907)
- Gustavus William Hamilton-Russell, 9th Viscount Boyne (1864–1942)
  - The Hon. Gustavus Lascelles Hamilton-Russell (1907–1940)
- Gustavus Michael George Hamilton-Russell, 10th Viscount Boyne (1931–1995)
- Gustavus Michael Stucley Hamilton-Russell, 11th Viscount Boyne (born 1965)

The heir apparent is the present holder's eldest twin son the Hon. Gustavus Archie Edward Hamilton-Russell (born 1999)

== Ancestry ==
Ancestors of Viscount Boyne

8. Gustavus Hamilton-Russell, 9th Viscount Boyne
4. Hon. Gustavus Hamilton-Russell
9. Lady Margaret Selina Lascelles
2. Gustavus Hamilton-Russell, 10th Viscount Boyne
10. Harry Lloyd-Verney
5. Joan Lloyd-Verney
11. Lady Joan Cuffe
1. Gustavus Hamilton-Russell, 11th Viscount Boyne
12. Sir Hugh Stucley, 4th Baronet
6. Sir Dennis Stucley, 5th Baronet
13. Gladys Bankes
3. Rosemary Stucley
14. George Bampfylde, 4th Baron Poltimore
7. Hon. Sheila Bampfylde
15. Cynthia Lascelles

== See also ==
- Duke of Hamilton
- Duke of Abercorn
