= Earl of Leitrim =

Title in the Peerage of Ireland

Earl of Leitrim was a title in the Peerage of Ireland.

== History ==
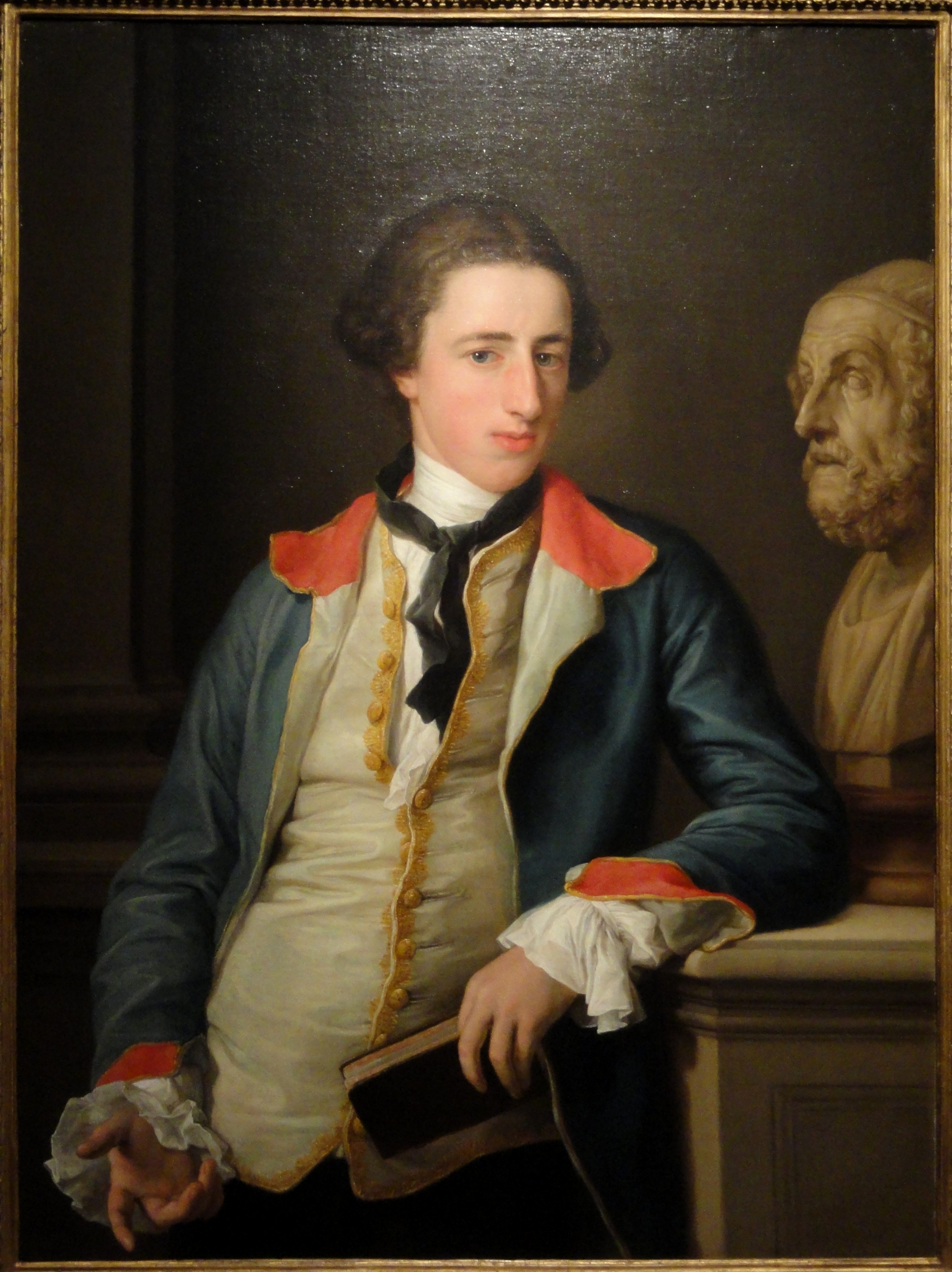
Portrait of the 1st Earl, by Pompeo Batoni, c. 1753-4

The earldom of Leitrim was created in 1795 for Robert Clements, 1st Viscount Leitrim. He had already been created Baron Leitrim, of Manor Hamilton in the County of Leitrim, in 1783, and Viscount Leitrim in 1793, also in the Peerage of Ireland. In 1800 he was elected as one of the 28 original Irish representative peer. Lord Leitrim was the son of the influential politician and financier Nathaniel Clements. He was succeeded by his son, the second Earl. He was created Baron Clements, of Kilmacrenan in the County of Donegal, in the Peerage of the United Kingdom in 1831, which gave him and his descendants an automatic seat in the House of Lords. His eldest son Robert Clements, Viscount Clements, represented County Leitrim in Parliament. However, he predeceased his father, unmarried. Lord Leitrim was succeeded by his second son, the third Earl. He also sat as Member of Parliament for County Leitrim. A deeply unpopular landlord, Lord Leitrim was instructed to arm himself for protection and to be in the company of a strong bodyguard. Lord Leitrim was killed near Milford in the north of County Donegal in the west of Ulster, along with his clerk and driver, by three men named Neil Shiels, Michael McElwee and Michael Heraghty, not far from his residence near Carrigart, in 1878. All three men were from Ballywhoriskey, McElwee went to America and Shiels was never caught. Heraghty didn't dispose of the gun properly which was later found along with other belongings with his daughter's name on them, he was tried and went to jail but later freed.

The third Earl was unmarried and was succeeded by his nephew, the fourth Earl. He was the son of the Reverend the Hon. Francis Nathanial Clements, fifth and youngest son of the second Earl. Lord Leitrim served in the Royal Navy. He was succeeded by his eldest son, the fifth Earl. He served as Lord-Lieutenant of the City of Londonderry. He was twice married but childless. As Lord Leitrim's two younger brothers had both died unmarried before him the titles became extinct on his death in 1952.

The Honourable Charles Clements, third son of the second Earl, was Member of Parliament for County Leitrim. Henry Clements, brother of the first Earl, represented Cavan Borough in the Irish House of Commons. Theophilus Clements, uncle of the first Earl, represented County Cavan in the Irish Parliament. The heir apparent to the earldom used the invented courtesy title Viscount Clements.

=== Family residences ===
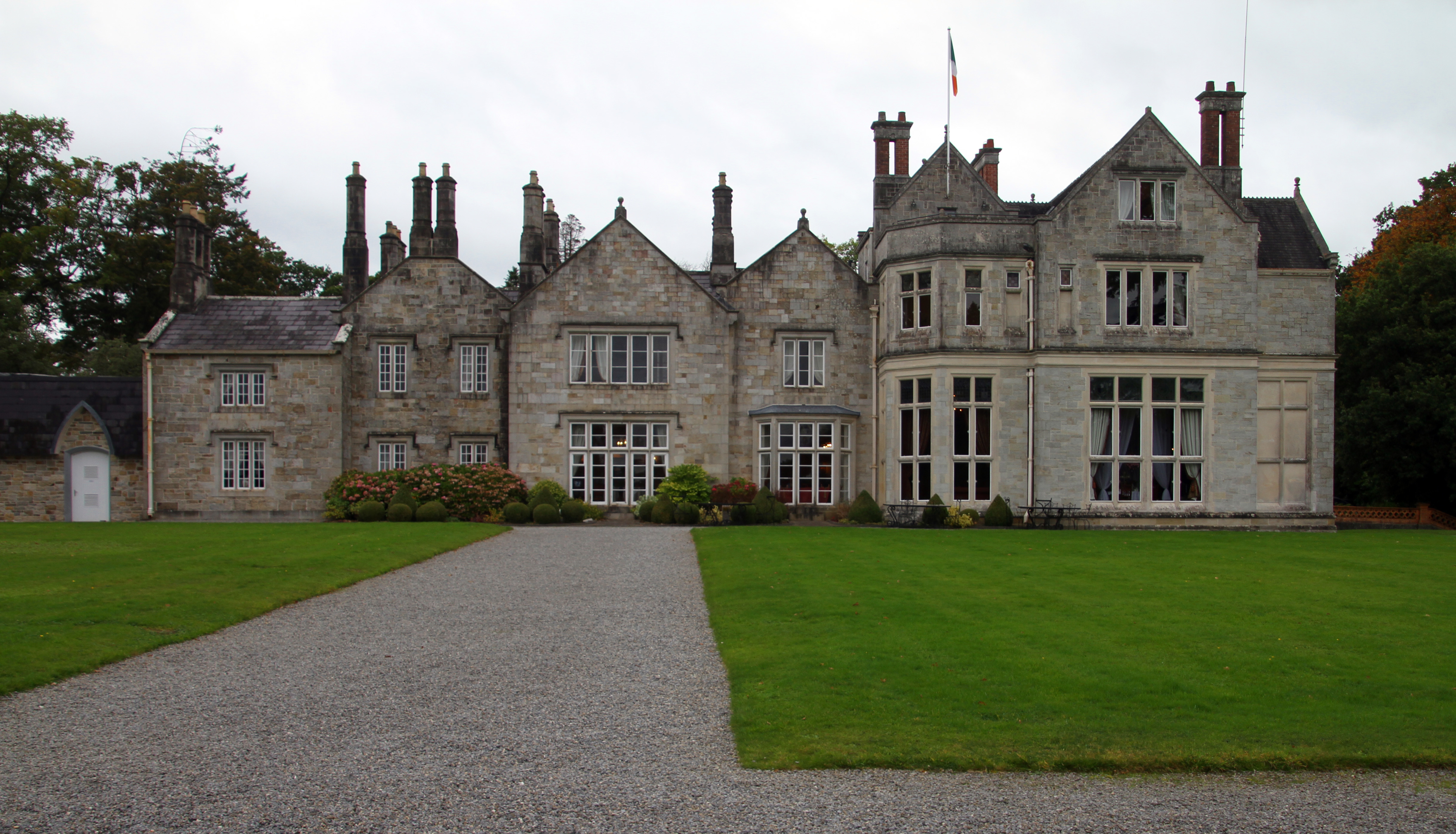
Lough Rynn House

The family seat of the Earls of Leitrim was Lough Rynn House, near Mohill, County Leitrim. Lough Rynn House has recently been restored and currently functions as a hotel and resort, renamed as Lough Rynn Castle. The 4th and 5th Earls of Leitrim, however, used mainly Mulroy House, near Carrigart in the north of County Donegal, as their residence.

Their Dublin city residence was located at 40 Upper Sackville Street. In 1807, the house was sold to Josiah Wedgwood II and in later years became a hotel named the Leitrim House Hotel in honour of the Earl. The family also had a London home in Grosvenor Square.

== Barons Leitrim, Second Creation (1783) ==
see Baron Leitrim for the First Creation

== Earls of Leitrim (1795) ==
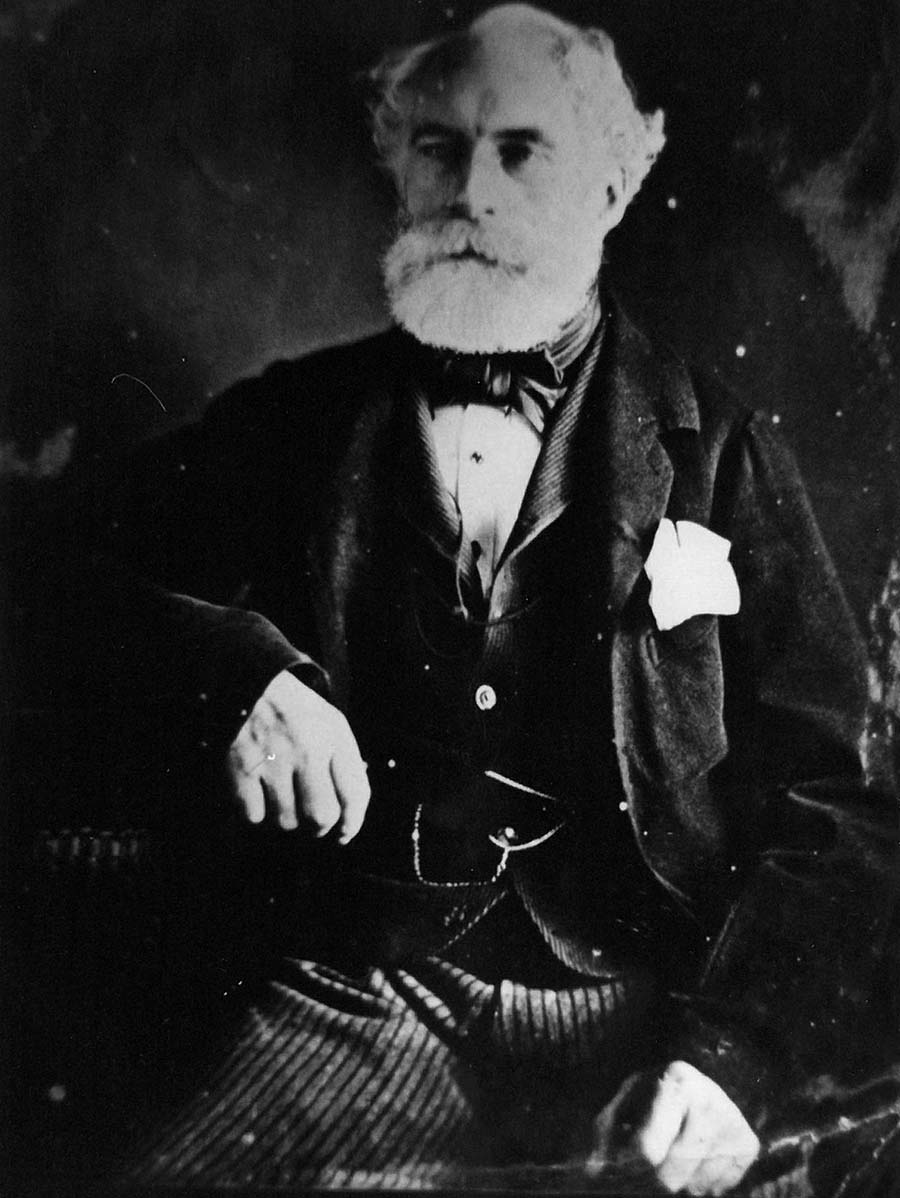
William Clements, 3rd Earl of Leitrim

- Robert Clements, 1st Earl of Leitrim (1732–1804)
- Nathaniel Clements, 2nd Earl of Leitrim (1768–1854)
  - Robert Bermingham Clements, Viscount Clements (1805–1839)
- William Sydney Clements, 3rd Earl of Leitrim (1806–1878)
- Robert Bermingham Clements, 4th Earl of Leitrim (1847–1892)
- Charles Clements, 5th Earl of Leitrim (1879–1952)
