= Theophilus Jones =

Theophilus Jones may refer to:

- Theophilus Jones (historian) (1758–1812), Welsh lawyer, known as a historian of Brecknockshire
- Theophilus Jones (printer) (died April 1736), Dublin printer and proprietor of the Dublin Evening Post
- Theophilus Jones (soldier) (died 1685), Welsh-Irish soldier and government official
- Theophilus Jones (1666–1742), Irish politician, MP for Leitrim 1695–1743
- Theophilus Jones (1729–1811), Irish politician and administrator
- Theophilus Jones (Royal Navy officer) (1760–1835), Irish Admiral in the Royal Navy, uncle of Theobald Jones
