= John Clements (1757–1817) =

East India Company ship's captain

John Clements (1757—10 July 1817) was a ship's captain in the service of the East India Company.

== Political career ==
In 1777 Clements was returned as Member of the Irish House of Commons for Cavan by his kinsman Robert Clements, replacing Robert's father Nathaniel, who was elected in the 1776 general election but had chosen to sit for Carrick. The pocket borough of Cavan was the subject of an agreement between the Clements and Nesbitt families to share representation equally. From March 1780 to May 1782 he was absent on a voyage to the Far East. He stood down at the 1783 general election to make way for Henry Theophilus Clements, who had been declared not duly elected for County Leitrim.
