= George St George =

George St George may refer to:

- Sir George St George (1583−1660), Irish MP, Vice-Admiral of Connaught
- Sir George St George (Carrick MP) (fl. 1640–1713), Irish politician, MP for Carrick
- George St George, 1st Baron Saint George (c. 1658–1735), Irish MP for County Roscommon, 1692–1715
- George St George (Athlone MP) (1682–1762), Irish politician, MP for Athlone
- St George St George, 1st Baron Saint George (c. 1715–1775), Irish politician, MP for Carrick from 1741, grandson of the previous Baron Saint George
- George Saint-George (1841–1924), British musical instrument maker and composer
