= Baron St George =

Title in Irish Peerage

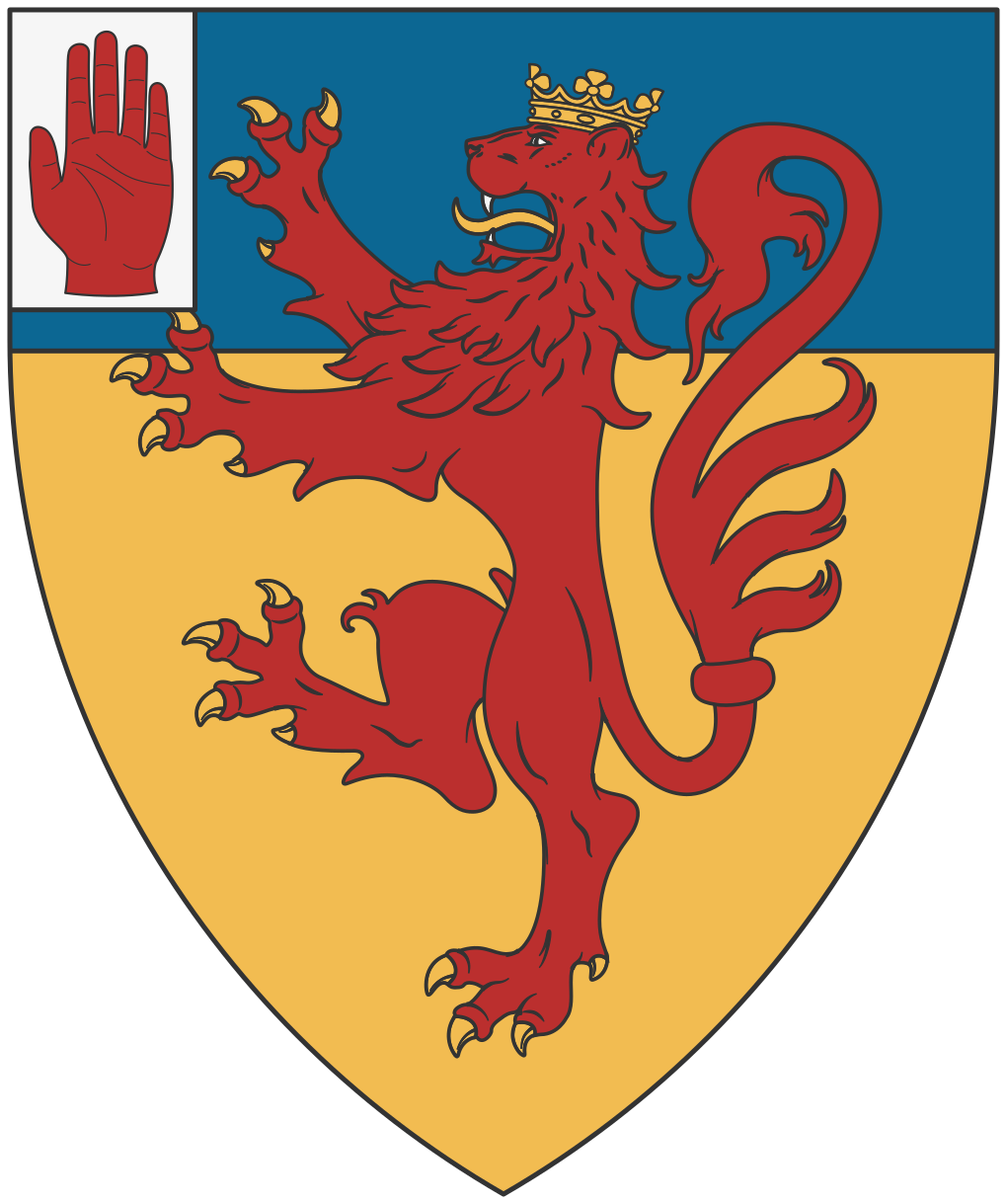
The coat of arms of the St George baronets of Carrickdrumrusk

Baron Saint George was a title that was created twice in the Peerage of Ireland. The first creation came in 1715 when Sir George St George, 2nd Baronet, was made Baron Saint George, of Hatley Saint George in the Counties of Roscommon and Leitrim. The baronetcy, of Carrickdrumrusk in the County of Leitrim, was created in the Baronetage of Ireland in 1660 for his father, Oliver St George. Lord St George died without male issue in 1735 when the titles became extinct. The title was revived in 1763 when St George St George was made Baron Saint George, of Hatley Saint George in the County of Roscommon. Born St George Ussher, he was the son of John Ussher and the Honourable Mary, daughter of the first Baron of the first creation. He assumed by Royal licence the surname of St George in lieu of his patronymic. Before his elevation to the peerage, Lord St George had represented Carrick in the Irish House of Commons. He had no surviving male issue and the title became extinct on his death in 1775. Olivia Ussher, sister of Lord St George, married Arthur French. Their son Christopher French assumed the surname of St George in lieu of his patronymic. He was the grandfather of Christopher St George.

Sir Richard St George, grandfather of the first Baronet, was Clarenceux King of Arms. Oliver St George, brother of the first Baron of the first creation, was a politician.

== Baron Saint George, first creation ==
=== St George baronets, of Carrickdrumrusk (1660) ===
- Sir Oliver St George, 1st Baronet (died 1695)
- Sir George St George, 2nd Baronet (died 1735) (created Baron Saint George in 1715)

=== Baron Saint George (1715) ===
- George St George, 1st Baron St George (died 1735)

== Baron Saint George, second creation (1763) ==
- St George St George, 1st Baron St George (died 1775)
