= Henry Clements =

Henry Clements may refer to:

- Henry Clements (1644–1696), Irish MP for Carrickfergus
- Henry Clements (1704–1745), Irish MP for Cavan
- Henry Theophilus Clements (1734–1795), Irish MP for Cavan and County Leitrim
- Henry John Clements (1781–1843), Irish MP for County Leitrim and County Cavan
