= Baron Leitrim =

Title created twice in the Peerage of Ireland

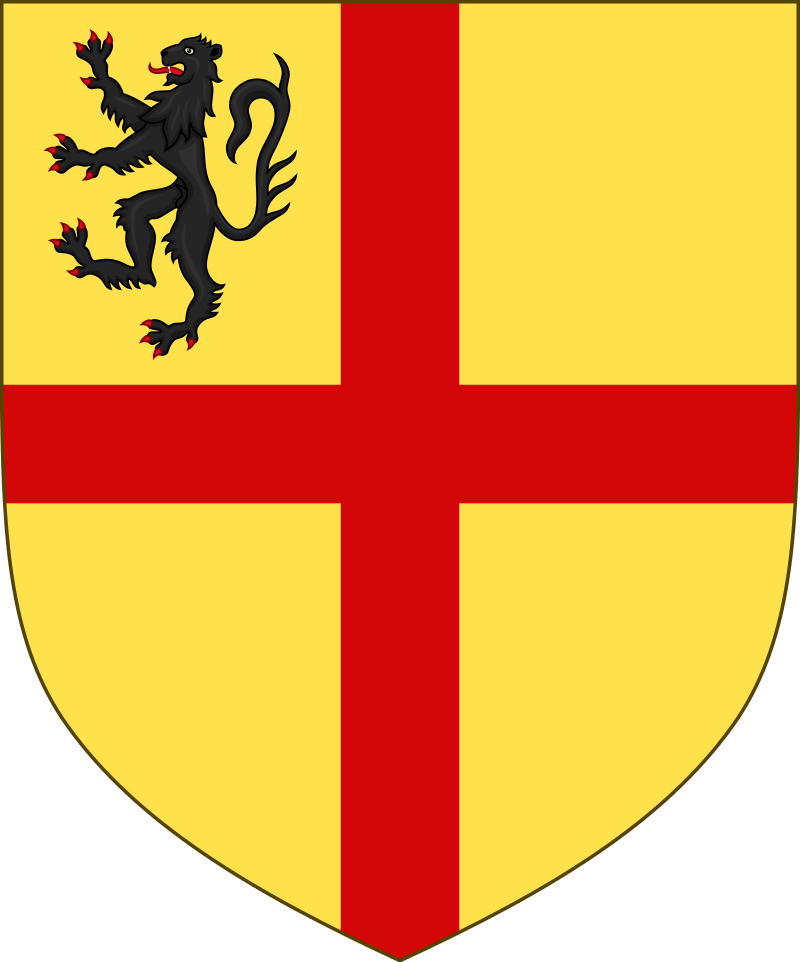
- Arms: of de Burgh/Burke: Or, a cross gules in the first quarter a lion rampant sable
- Creation date: May 1580 (First Creation); 1783 (Second Creation)
- Created by: Elizabeth I (First Creation); George III (Second Creation)
- Peerage: Peerage of Ireland
- First holder: John Bourke (First Creation)
- Last holder: Charles Clements, 5th Earl of Leitrim (Second Creation)
- Status: Extinct
- Extinction date: 1591 (First Creation); 1952 (Second Creation)

Baron Leitrim was a title in the Peerage of Ireland which was first created in 1583 for Seán mac an Iarla a Búrc, and became extinct in 1591 on the death of his son, Redmond, second Baron. The title's second creation was in 1783 for Robert Clements, who was later created Earl of Leitrim.

== Barons Leitrim (1583) ==
- Seán mac an Iarla a Búrc or John Burke, 1st Baron Leitrim, or "John of the Shamrocks" (d.1583)
- Redmond Burke, Baron Leitrim (d.1602)

== Barons Leitrim (1783) ==
- Robert Clements, 1st Earl of Leitrim (1732–1804), created Baron Leitrim in 1783; Viscount Leitrim in 1794; and Earl of Leitrim in 1801
- See Earl of Leitrim for further Barons Leitrim of this creation

== See also ==
- House of Burgh, an Anglo-Norman and Hiberno-Norman dynasty founded in 1193
