= Walter Jones (Irish politician) =

Irish politician

Walter Jones (29 December 1754 – 1839) was an Irish politician from County Leitrim. He held local offices in Leitrim and some minor national patronage offices, and entered Parliament on the interest of his relatives the Beresford family.

Representing the town of Coleraine in County Londonderry, Jones sat in the House of Commons of Ireland from 1798 until its abolition in 1800, and then in the House of Commons of the United Kingdom for most of the period 1801 to 1809.

== Early life and family ==
Jones was the oldest son of Theophilus Jones (1729–1811), a member of the Irish House of Commons from 1761 to 1800, and then of House of Commons of the United Kingdom from 1801 to 1802. Their mother Catherine Beresford (died 1763) was a daughter of the 1st Earl of Tyrone.

His younger brother Admiral Theophilus Jones (1760–1835) was an officer in the British Royal Navy. His third brother Reverend James Jones (died 1825) was a Church of Ireland clergyman in County Londonderry, and father of Admiral Theobald Jones.

Their family home was at Headfort, near Drumsna in County Leitrim. Anthony Trollope's first published novel was written while he was staying in Drumsna in 1843, inspired by the ruins of Headfort. Trollope wrote in his diary: "While I was still among the ruined walls and decayed beams I fabricated the plot of The Macdermots of Ballycloran".

The Joneses traced their ancestry to Bryan Jones (died 1681), a Welshman who had been granted lands in Ireland by King James VI and I in 1622. Bryan's grandson Theophilus Jones (1666–1742), grandfather of this Walter Jones, was a member of the Irish House of Commons from 1692 to 1742, for Sligo and then County Leitrim.

== Career ==
Jones was Sheriff of Leitrim in 1795–6, an office which was held by members of his family over ten times on the 17th and 18th centuries. He served as Colonel of the Leitrim militia from 1795 to 1807.

He was elected to the Parliament of Ireland for Coleraine at a by-election in 1798, on the interest of his uncle the 1st Marquess of Waterford. The borough of Coleraine had been managed on behalf of the London Society by John Claudius Beresford, cousin of the Marquess (who purchased control of the borough in 1799). The Beresfords used Coleraine to elect members of their own family. The by-election arose because both of Coleraine's two seats had been won by candidates who were also elected for other seats, and had chosen to sit for those other seats rather than for Coleraine.

Under the Act of Union in 1800, Coleraine was one of Irish boroughs which retained a Parliamentary seat, although like most boroughs which retained their franchise, its representation was reduced from two members to one. The choice of which of the two current members would sit in Westminster was drawn by lot on 1 December 1800. However, in 15 boroughs where one of the members resigned their seat, no draw was needed. The other Coleraine MP, John Beresford was one of those who resigned, leaving Jones – who had supported the Union – as Coleraine's first Westminster MP.

He was re-elected at the general election in 1802. However, in 1806 it appeared that Sir George Hill's seat in County Londonderry might be contested, so Jones stood down in favour of Hill.

Hill won his contest for the County, and chose to sit for the County, so there was a by-election for Coleraine at which Jones was returned unopposed. He was re-elected unopposed in 1807 and held the seat until 1809, when he resigned his seat by the procedural device of taking the Chiltern Hundreds. This was to make way for yet another Beresford nominee: John Poo Beresford, illegitimate son of Jones's uncle, the 1st Marquess of Waterford.

Jones was governor of County Leitrim in 1805.

== Sources ==
- Walker, Brian M., ed. (1978). Parliamentary Election Results in Ireland 1801–1922. A New History of Ireland. Dublin: Royal Irish Academy. ISBN 0-901714-12-7. ISSN 0332-0286.

Parliament of Ireland
Preceded by The Earl of Tyrone; John Beresford	Member of Parliament for Coleraine; 1798–1800; With: John Beresford II	Succeeded by Parliament of the United Kingdom
Parliament of the United Kingdom
Preceded by Parliament of Ireland	Member of Parliament for Coleraine; 1801–1806	Succeeded by Sir George FitzGerald Hill, Bt
Preceded by Sir George FitzGerald Hill, Bt	Member of Parliament for Coleraine; 1807–1809	Succeeded by John Beresford
