= Annals of Ulster =

Chronicle of Irish history

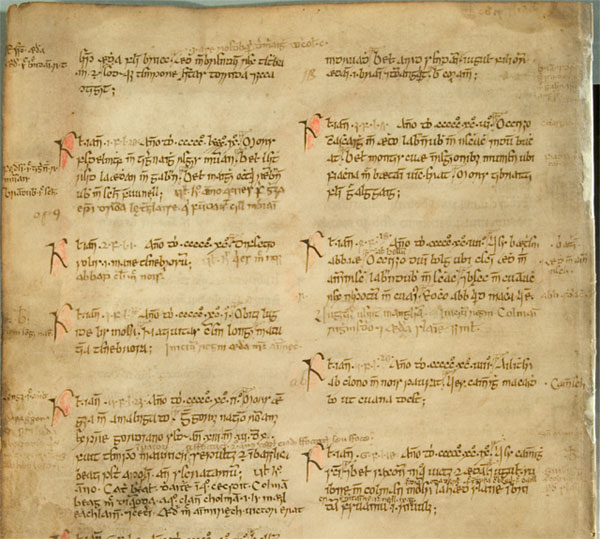
- Original title: (Irish: Annála Uladh)
- Subject: Medieval Ireland
- Publication place: Ireland

The Annals of Ulster (Irish: Annála Uladh) are annals of medieval Ireland. The entries span the years from 431 AD to 1540 AD. The entries up to 1489 AD were compiled in the late 15th century by the scribe Ruaidhrí Ó Luinín, under his patron Cathal Óg Mac Maghnusa, on the island of Senadh-Mic-Maghnusa, also known as Senad or Ballymacmanus Island (now known as Belle Isle, where Belle Isle Castle is located), near Lisbellaw, on Lough Erne in the kingdom of Fir Manach (Fermanagh). Later entries (up to AD 1540) were added by others.

Entries up to the mid-6th century are retrospective, drawing on earlier annalistic and historical texts, while later entries were contemporary, based on recollection and oral history. T. M. Charles-Edwards has claimed that the main source for its records of the first millennium A.D. is a now-lost Armagh continuation of the Chronicle of Ireland.

The Annals used the Irish language, with some entries in Latin. Because their sources were copied verbatim, the Annals are useful not just for historians, but also for linguists studying the evolution of the Irish language.

A century later, the Annals of Ulster became an important source for the authors of the Annals of the Four Masters. It also informs the Irish text Cogad Gáedel re Gallaib.

The Library of Trinity College, Dublin, possesses the original manuscript; the Bodleian Library in Oxford has a contemporary copy that fills some of the gaps in the original. There are two main modern English translations of the annals – Mac Airt and Mac Niocaill (1983) and MacCarthy (1893).

== Content ==
=== Kings ===
Several kings are mentioned throughout the Annals of Ulster. The Annals tend to follow the lives of the kings, including important battles, raids, and their ultimate death. Between the years of 847 and 879, three different kings are highlighted. For example: Máel Sechnaill mac Máele Ruanaid, the king of the southern Ui Neill clan from 846 to 862:

- 839.6 – First mentioned in the Annals of Ulster having killed Crunnmael son of Fiannamail.
- 841.2 – Kills Diarmait
- 843.1 – Mael Sechnaill's father, Mael Ruanaid, dies
- 845.7 – Kills his brother Flann
- 845.8 – Takes Tuirgéis prisoner
- 846.7 – Suffers heavy losses at hands of Tigernach
- 847.2 – Begins his reign.
- 847.3 – Destroys the Island of Loch Muinremor
- 848.4 – defeats Vikings at Forach
- 849.12 – conducts siege in Crupat
- 850.3 – Cinaed, king of Cianacht, with help from foreign forces rebels against Mael Sechnaill
- 851.2 – kills Cinaed, king of Cianacht
- 851.5 – attends a conference in Ard Macha
- 854.2 – took hostages from Mumu at Inneóin na nDéise
- 856.2 – took hostages from Mumu at Caisel
- 856.3 – battle against the Vikings
- 858.4 – marched against Mumu, took hostages from them and travelled with them "from Belat Gabráin to Inis Tarbnai off the Irish coast, and from Dún Cermna to Ára Airthir."
- 859.3 – attends a conference at Ráith Aeda Meic Bric "to make peace and amity between the men of Ireland"
- 860.1 – leads army into the north, attacked, but holds position
- 862.5 – Dies and is described as "king of all Ireland"

The same pattern is followed for Aed mac Neill, the king of the northern Ui Neill clan. Aed mac Neill appears in the following entries in the Annals of Ulster: 855.3, 856.5, 860.1, 861.1, 862.2, 862.3, 863.2, 864.1, 864.3, 866.4, 868.4, 870.2, 874.4, and finally 879.1

The final entry ends with the entry about his death and includes a poem. It reads "Aed son of Niall, king of Temair, fell asleep on the twelfth of the Kalends of 20 December Nov at Druim Inasclainn in the territory of Conaille.

1. (Twelve days before the melodious Kalends
Of December—a harsh company—
A wonderful person died to your loss(?),
Aed of Ailech, over-king of the Irish.

2. A generous prudent man of shields
Who brought plenty to landed Temair,
Against iron-tipped spears a buckler
From the forge-fire of the land of the sons of Mil.)"

Just as with the Irish kings, the Annals of Ulster follows the lives of the Viking kings of Dublin. For example, Amlaíb Conung (Olaf Konung) is mentioned in the following entries: 853.2, 857.1, 859.2, 863.4, 864.2, 866.1, 867.8, 869.6, 870.6, 871.2, and 875.4

The final entry deviates from the Irish kings and instead tells of the death of Amlaib's son, Oistín and reads: "Oistín son of Amlaíb, king of the Norsemen, was deceitfully killed by Albann."

=== Places ===
Along with kings and kingdoms, the entries in the Annals of Ulster focus on important places of Ireland such as Armagh, the ecclesiastical capital of Ireland, which appears several times throughout the text. Dublin, for example, referred to in the text as either Áth Cliath or Duiblinn, is described in the Annals of Ulster with entries ranging from the settlement of Dublin by Vikings ("The heathens still at Duiblinn" in 842.2 and "An encampment of the foreigners of Áth Cliath at Cluain Andobuir" in 845.12) to deaths of notable names ("Carlus son of Conn son of Donnchad was killed in Áth Cliath" in 960.2) to Dublin being ruled by the Irish ("The foreigners returned to Áth Cliath and gave hostages to Brian" in 1000.4).

The town appears 66 different times in the Annals of Ulster and can be found in the following entries: 770.1, 790.2, 841.4, 842.2, 842.7, 845.12, 851.3, 870.2, 871.2 893.4, 895.6, 902.2, 917.4, 919.3, 920.5, 921.5, 921.8, 924.3, 926.6, 927.3, 930.1, 936.2, 938.5, 938.6, 939.1, 942.3, 942.7, 944.3, 945.6, 946.1, 947.1, 950.7, 951.3, 951.7, 956.3, 960.2, 961.1, 978.3, 980.1, 994.6, 995.2, 999.8, 1000.4, 1013.12, 1013.13, 1014.2, 1018.2, 1021.1, 1022.4, 1031.2, 1035.5, 1070.2, 1075.1, 1075.4, 1084.8, 1088.4, 1094.2, 1095.4, 1100.5, 1103.5, 1105.3, 1115.4, 1118.6, 1121.7, 1126.7, and 1128.6

== Historical context ==
=== Vikings in Ireland ===
The Annals of Ulster contains a large amount of historical information on the invasions of the Vikings into Ireland and several specific events are mentioned that are paralleled in other Irish works such as the Cogad Gáedel re Gallaib. The Annals of Ulster documents the Viking invasions one year after the common starting event of the Viking Period, the raiding of Lindisfarne in 793, as mentioned by the Anglo-Saxon Chronicle. The first mention of the Vikings is very brief. "794.7 Devastation of all the islands of Britain by heathens," yet over the course of the annals their attacks become more specific "807.8 The heathens burned Inis Muiredaig and invade Ros Comáin."

The Vikings are called several different names throughout the annals: foreigners, dark or fair-foreigners, heathens, Norsemen, Norse-Irish and Danes. It is often unclear if these titles attribute nationalities or certain alliances as they are used intermixed throughout.

The annals mention the foreigners’ beginnings in Ireland as one of plunder and slave-taking. According to the annals, the Norsemen took many slaves in their raids. "821.3 Étar was plundered by the heathens, and they carried off a great number of women into captivity." However, eventually they established a permanent base in Áth Cliath or Dublin by 841. In "841.4 There was a naval camp at Linn Duachaill from which the peoples and churches of Tethba were plundered. There was a naval camp at Duiblinn from which the Laigin and the Uí Néill were plundered, both states and churches, as far as Sliab Bladma."

Although the Vikings are portrayed as heathens, the Annals describes strife between the Irish against each other and often the foreigners are depicted as allies to various Irish factions. The depiction of warfare involving the "heathens" is not one-sided; in the annals, they are often allied with the Irish against other Irish. Some Irishmen are even accused of doing the same sort of raiding as the Viking invaders. In "847.3 Mael Sechnaill destroyed the Island of Loch Muinremor, overcoming there a large band of wicked men of Luigni and Gailenga, who had been plundering the territories in the manner of the heathens."

Several famous battles and characters involving the Vikings can be found in the Annals of Ulster. The Battle of Brunanburh 937.6, the Battle of Tara 980.1, and the Battle of Clontarf 1014.1 are all described in brief detail. Some Viking individuals of note mentioned in the annals with parallels in other historical sources are the foreign chieftain Turgeis, beginning in 845, Ímar and Amlaíb, the later progenitors of the Uí Ímair, rulers of Áth Cliath or Dublin. Irish historical figures included within the text are Máel Sechnaill, Muirchertach son of Niall and Brian Boru.

== Editions ==
- Mac Airt, Seán and Gearóid Mac Niocaill (eds and trs.). The Annals of Ulster (to AD 1131). DIAS, Dublin, 1983. ISBN 0901282774. Available from CELT: edition in vol. 1 (AD 431–1131), pp. 38–578, which excludes the pre-Patrician sections (Irish World Chronicle), pp. 2–36.
- Mac Carthy, B. (ed. and tr.). Annala Uladh: Annals of Ulster otherwise Annala Senait, Annals of Senat: a chronicle of Irish affairs from A.D. 431 to A.D. 1540. 4 vols. Dublin, 1895. Available from the Internet Archive: vol. 1 (AD 431–1056), vol. 2 (AD 1057–1378) and vol. 3 (AD 1379–1588). Available from CELT, with notes of warning:
  - AD 1155–1201 (vols. 1 and 2): edition
  - AD 431–1201 (vols. 1 and 2): translation
  - AD 1201–1378 (in vol. 2): edition and translation.
  - AD 1379–1588 (vol. 3): edition and translation.

== See also ==
- Irish annals
- Chronicle of Ireland
