= Cavan Borough (Parliament of Ireland constituency) =

1611–1801 Irish constituency

Cavan
- Former borough constituency for the Irish House of Commons
- County: County Cavan
- Borough: Cavan

1611–1801
- Seats: 2
- Replaced by: Disfranchised

Cavan was a constituency represented in the Irish House of Commons from 1611 to 1801.

Between 1725 and 1793 Catholics and those married to Catholics could not vote.

== Borough ==
This constituency was the borough of Cavan in County Cavan.

== History ==
It returned two members to the Parliament of Ireland from 1611 to 1801. In the Patriot Parliament of 1689 summoned by King James II, Cavan Borough was represented by two members. The borough was disenfranchised under the terms of the Acts of Union 1800. £15,000 in compensation was divided between Theophilus Clements and Thomas Nesbitt.

== Members of Parliament, 1611–1801 ==
| Election | First MP | Second MP |
|---|---|---|
| 1613 | Hugh Culme | George Seaton |
| 1614 | Walter Brady | Thomas Brady |
| 1634 | Brockhill Taylor | Alan Cooke |
| 1639 | Alan Cooke | Edward Lake (expelled 1640) |
| Interregnum | Irish MPs sat in the Parliament of the Protectorate | |
| 1661 | William Moore | Thomas Ashe |
| 1689 | Philip Og O'Reilly | Hugh Reily |
| 1692 | Thomas Ashe | Robert Saunders |
| 1709 | Thomas Ashe | Joseph Addison |
| 1713 | Charles Lambart | Theophilus Clements |
| 1715 | Thomas Nesbitt | Theophilus Clements |
| 1729 | Thomas Nesbitt | Henry Clements |
| 1745 | Thomas Nesbitt | Robert Clements |
| 1747 | Thomas Nesbitt | Edward Weston |
| 1750 | Cosby Nesbitt | Edward Weston |
| 1761 | Cosby Nesbitt | Nathaniel Clements (Note: Also elected for County Leitrim in 1768, for which he chose to sit.) |
| 1768 | Cosby Nesbitt | Thomas Nesbitt |
| 1769 | Henry Theophilus Clements | Thomas Nesbitt |
| 1776 | Nathaniel Clements (Note: Also elected for Carrick in 1776, for which he chose to sit.) | Thomas Nesbitt |
| 1777 | John Clements | Thomas Nesbitt |
| 1783 | Henry Theophilus Clements | Thomas Nesbitt |
| 1790 | Lord Charles James FitzGerald | Thomas Nesbitt |
| 1798 | Viscount Clements (Note: Also elected for County Leitrim in 1798, for which he chose to sit.) | Thomas Nesbitt |
| 1798 | George Cavendish | Thomas Nesbitt |
| 1801 | Disenfranchised | |

== Bibliography ==
- O'Hart, John (2007). The Irish and Anglo-Irish Landed Gentry: When Cromwell came to Ireland. Vol. II. Heritage Books. ISBN 978-0-7884-1927-0.
- Leigh Rayment's historical List of Members of the Irish House of Commons. Cites: Johnston-Liik, Edith Mary (2002). The History of the Irish Parliament 1692-1800 (6 volumes). Ulster Historical Foundation.
