= Lord Lieutenant of Londonderry =

Lord Lieutenant of Londonderry may refer to two different offices:

- Lord Lieutenant of County Londonderry
- Lord Lieutenant of the City of Londonderry (originally formally the County of the City of Londonderry, later County Borough of Londonderry
