= Theophilus Jones (Royal Navy officer) =

Irish Royal Navy Admiral (1760–1835)

Theophilus Jones (September 1760 – 8 November 1835) was an Irish officer in the British Royal Navy. As a captain, he commanded a series of warships during the French Revolutionary Wars, and experienced two mutinies during his command of HMS Defiance in the late 1790s. He was promoted to the ranks of rear admiral in 1802, vice admiral in 1809, and full admiral in 1819.

== Early life and family ==
Jones was the second son of Theophilus Jones (1729–1811), a member of the Irish House of Commons from 1761 to 1800, and then of the House of Commons of the United Kingdom from 1801 to 1802. Their mother Catherine Beresford (died 1763) was a daughter of the 1st Earl of Tyrone.

His older brother Walter (1754–1839) was governor of County Leitrim, and an MP for Coleraine in the latter years of the Irish Parliament, and then sat for Coleraine at Westminster for most of the period until 1809. His younger brother Reverend James Jones (died 1825) was a Church of Ireland clergyman in County Londonderry, father of Admiral Theobald Jones, and brother-in-law of Admiral Henry Blackwood.

The family traced their ancestry to Bryan Jones (died 1681), a Welshman who had been granted lands in Ireland by King James VI and I in 1622. Bryan's grandson Theophilus Jones (1666–1742), grandfather of Admiral Theophilus Jones, was a member of the Irish House of Commons from 1692 to 1742, for Sligo and then County Leitrim.

== Career ==
Jones was promoted to the rank of captain on 4 September 1782, and took command of the 74-gun HMS Hero, commanding her in the 1783 Battle of Cuddalore under Admiral Sir Edward Hughes. He was one of the first British officers engaged in the French Revolutionary Wars, commanding HMS Andromache in 1793, then the 64-gun HMS Trident. In 1796, Jones took command of the 74-gun HMS Defiance. Defiance had already seen a mutiny in 1795, which had been ended by Captain William Bligh. Bligh had taken 200 troops on board his Calcutta (formerly the East Indiaman Warley), and bringing them alongside Defiance had been enough to end the mutiny without a boarding.

The crew mutinied again while under Jones's command, as part of the Channel mutinies in 1797. In 1798, during the Irish Rebellion, Defiance was in Portsmouth. A plot was discovered amongst Catholic crewmen, who had taken an oath to seize control of the ship and take her to Brest under a green ensign with a harp on it, killing all the officers except the captain.

Twenty-five men were court-martialled aboard HMS Gladiator in a hearing which began on 9 September under Captain Holloway. Jones conducted the prosecution, and on 13 September the court adjourned to deliberate. The following day, 14 September, all but one were found guilty. Holloway pronounced them traitors, and Judge Advocate General Greetham read the sentences. Nineteen were sentenced to death by hanging aboard a ship, though eight were recommended for mercy, to be transported for life. Two men were sentenced to 200 lashes and 12 months solitary imprisonment, two to 100 lashes and six months imprisonment, and one to 12 months imprisonment. A government order was received in Portsmouth on 26 September, setting the following day for execution of 11 men. The hangings took place as ordered on Thursday 27 September. At 9am on board HMS St George off Spithead, seven men were (in the words of The Morning Post and Gazetter) "launched into eternity". At 11:15 am, the remaining four were hanged on board HMS Resolution, in Portsmouth harbour. All but one of the condemned men maintained their innocence to the end, and The Observer newspaper reported that "every means was adopted to make the execution on Thursday as awful and impressive as possible".

Jones later commanded the three-deckers HMS Atlas and HMS Queen, but did not hold a command after the 1802 Treaty of Amiens temporarily ended hostilities between the French First Republic and the United Kingdom. He was promoted to rear admiral in 1802, vice admiral in 1809, and full admiral in 1819.

He died on 8 November 1835 in Maidstone.
