= Henry Theophilus Clements =

Anglo-Irish soldier, politician and official (d. 1795)

Henry Theophilus Clements PC(I) (1734 – 26 October 1795) was an Anglo-Irish soldier, politician and official in the Dublin Castle administration in Ireland.

== Early life ==
Clements was the second son of Nathaniel Clements and Hannah (née Gore). He was the younger brother of Robert Clements, 1st Earl of Leitrim. He had four sisters, through whom he was the brother-in-law of Francis Conyngham, 2nd Baron Conyngham, George Leslie Montgomery, Eyre Massey, 1st Baron Clarina and Ralph Gore, 1st Earl of Ross. He was raised at the family seat at Ashfield Lodge, County Cavan and at Woodville, Lucan, Dublin.

== Career ==
In 1757, Clements was commissioned into the 30th Regiment of Foot. By 1764, he was lieutenant colonel of the 69th Regiment of Foot. In 1766 he served as High Sheriff of Cavan. In 1769, he was elected as a Member of Parliament for Cavan Borough in the Irish House of Commons. In 1772 he succeeded his father as agent to regiments serving abroad, with an income of £800 per year, and in 1777 Clements also became deputy vice-treasurer and paymaster of pensions, together worth a further £2,000 per year. Although not the eldest son, he inherited his father's estate at Ashfield Lodge, with a rental income of around £3,000 per year. In 1773 he was appointed High Sheriff of Leitrim and in 1776 he was elected to represent County Leitrim.

In parliament, Clements was a staunch supporter of the Dublin Castle administration, voting against legislative independence and parliamentary reform. He did, however, vote in favour of Roman Catholic relief bills in 1774 and 1778. He was appointed to the Privy Council of Ireland in 1777. In 1783, he was unseated from Leitrim by a popular petition after being accused of bribing voters; he returned to representing Cavan Borough instead. In the early 1780s, Clements was colonel of the Leitrim Rangers Volunteers.

On 25 December 1783, Clements was appointed paymaster and receiver general of Ireland. In this role he reformed the financial administration in Ireland and was closely involved in developing a national lottery in 1686. In 1785 it was estimated that he held government positions worth £2,400 a year. He was a member of the committee that prepared the draft bill for the establishment of the Bank of Ireland in 1781, and he subscribed the maximum permissible sum of £10,000 to the bank's capital on its foundation in 1783. In 1790 he was elected again to represent Leitrim; he held the seat until his death.

He died on 26 October 1795 at his home in County Leitrim and was buried in St. Michan's Church, Dublin.

== Family ==
Clements was married twice. On 2 June 1770, he married firstly Mary, daughter and heiress of Daniel Webb, with whom he had two daughters. After Mary's death in 1777, he married secondly Catherine, eldest daughter of John Beresford, on 7 August 1778. This marriage produced three sons and two daughters.

Parliament of Ireland
Preceded by Cosby Nesbitt; Thomas Nesbitt	Member of Parliament for Cavan Borough; 1769–1776; With: Thomas Nesbitt	Succeeded by Nathaniel Clements; Thomas Nesbitt
Preceded by Nathaniel Clements; William Gore	Member of Parliament for County Leitrim; 1776–1783; With: Theophilus Jones (1776–1783); Peter La Touche (1783)	Succeeded by John Gore; Peter La Touche
Preceded by John Clements; Thomas Nesbitt	Member of Parliament for Cavan Borough; 1783–1790; With: Thomas Nesbitt	Succeeded by Lord Charles FitzGerald; Thomas Nesbitt
Preceded by John Gore; Peter La Touche	Member of Parliament for County Leitrim; 1790–1795; With: Theophilus Jones	Succeeded by Peter La Touche; Theophilus Jones
