= Edward Weston (politician) =

British politician

- Portrait by Jean-Baptiste van Loo

Member of Parliament for Cavan Borough
- In office 1747–1760 Serving with Thomas Nesbitt (1747-50); Cosby Nesbitt (1750-60)
- Preceded by: Thomas Nesbitt; Robert Clements
- Succeeded by: Cosby Nesbitt; Nathaniel Clements

Personal details
- Born: 1703 Eton, England
- Died: 15 July 1770 (aged 66–67) Buxton, Derbyshire, England
- Education: Eton College
- Alma mater: King's College, Cambridge
- Occupation: Politician
- Spouse: Penelope Patrick (m. 1730)
- Father: Stephen Weston

Edward Weston (1703–1770) was an English didactic writer and politician.

== Early life and education ==
He was the second son of Stephen Weston, bishop of Exeter. He was born at Eton in 1703 and was educated at Eton College and at King's College, Cambridge, where he was admitted in 1719, graduating B.A. in 1723 and M.A. in 1727.

Horace Walpole states that he went in 1725 to Bexley in Kent with his cousins, "the four younger sons of Lord Townshend, and with a tutor, Edward Weston ... and continued there some months." (The first date is considered a misprint for 1723, since Walpole was under Weston's charge in July 1724.

== Career ==
Weston was secretary to Lord Townshend during the king's residence at Hanover in 1729, and, on his retirement from office, lost "a very generous friend and patron". In May 1730 he offered his services to Lord Harrington, and when that peer was made secretary of state for the northern department, Weston became under-secretary, remaining in the position until 1746. He was appointed on 8 September 1741 to be editor of the London Gazette, with a salary of £500 per annum, and held that post until his death. In November 1746 Harrington went to Ireland as Lord Lieutenant, and Weston accompanied him as chief secretary, where he was a member of parliament for Cavan Borough from 1747 to 1760 and was created a privy councillor for Ireland. He remained there until 1751, and then through ill-health went into retirement for ten years.

He had purchased from his relative, Mr. Rossiter, the parish of Somerby, and the greater part of the next parish of Searby, in Lincolnshire. He lived at Somerby Hall, as did many of his descendants until the 1930s. The house was demolished in 1964.

At Lord Bute's request returned in March 1761 to his old post in the northern department. He was a clerk of the signet and was allowed to perform his duties by deputy. In August 1762 he received a grant for 31 years of the office of alnager in Ireland, and next August resigned it on receiving a pension of £500 per annum for the same period. On 1 September in that year, he was appointed one of the commissioners to execute the office of privy seal. In July 1763 he addressed a letter to George Grenville on his ill-health and his sole reward "of £275 per annum, with the honourable title of gazetteer" in the secretary's department.

Weston then served under Lord Halifax in the southern department and recommended the issue of a general warrant against John Wilkes. Next May his health broke down, and he retired from office, a pension of £750 per annum being granted to him for his services. He died at Buxton, Derbyshire on 15 July 1770, and was buried at St Margaret's church, Somerby, Lincolnshire, where a monument recorded his memory.

== Family ==
Weston married, early in 1730, Penelope, granddaughter of Bishop Simon Patrick, and eldest daughter and coheiress of the Rev. Symon Patrick of Dalham, Suffolk, by Anne, daughter of Thomas Fountayne of Melton, Yorkshire. Weston's second wife was Anne, younger daughter of John Fountayne of Melton. Both his wives were nieces of the wife of Thomas Sherlock, Bishop of London. Weston had several children. Anne, one of his daughters, married Sir Jacob Wolff.

== Works ==
Junius, under the impression that Weston was the author of A Vindication of the Duke of Grafton, assailed him in his tenth letter, calling him comptroller of the salt office, a clerk of the signet, and a pensioner on the Irish establishment; but Weston denied the authorship. He also disclaimed in 1769 a pamphlet entitled The Political Conduct of the Earl of Chatham.

- The Englishman directed in the Choice of his Religion, 1740, 4th e. 1767 (anon.)
- The Country Gentleman's Advice to his Son on Coming of Age, 1755 (anon.)
- The Country Gentleman's Advice to his Neighbours, 1755 (anon.), 3rd e. by Edward Weston, with a letter to the Bishop of London, 1756; 4th e., with a second addition to the letter, 1756.
- Family Discourses by a Country Gentleman, 1768 (anon.), 2nd e. by the late Edward Weston, 1776, edited by his son, Charles Weston, prebendary of Durham. Weston wrote on the Jew Bill (1753) and replied to Bishop Warburton (Letters to Hurd, 1759, in 2nd e. pp. 280 and 284).

Weston was a good Classical scholar, and composed a Latin ode on the marriage of George III. He also drew up the long epitaph in Fulham churchyard to Bishop Sherlock.

Parliament of Ireland
Preceded by Thomas Nesbitt; Robert Clements	Member of Parliament for Cavan Borough; 1747–1760; With: Thomas Nesbitt to 1750; Cosby Nesbitt from 1750	Succeeded by Cosby Nesbitt; Nathaniel Clements
Political offices
Preceded by Sewallis Shirley	Chief Secretary for Ireland; 1746–1750	Succeeded by Lord George Sackville
