= 92nd Regiment of Foot (disambiguation) =

92nd Regiment of Foot may refer to:

- 92nd Regiment of Foot (Donegal Light Infantry), a British Army regiment 1760–1763
- 92nd Regiment of Foot (1779), a British Army regiment 1779–1783
- 92nd Regiment of Foot (1793-1795), a British Army regiment 1793–1795
- 92nd (Gordon Highlanders) Regiment of Foot, a British Army regiment, renumbered from 100th Regiment in 1798
