= Somerby (Juxta Bigby) =

Hamlet and civil parish in the West Lindsey district of Lincolnshire, England

Coordinates: 53.54575200°N 0.40017074°W

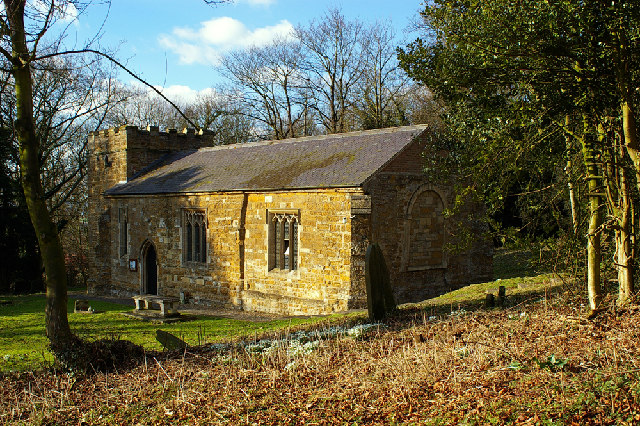
- St Margaret's Church, Somerby

- Location within Lincolnshire
- OS grid reference: TA061066
  - London: 145 mi (233 km) S
- Civil parish: Somerby
- District: West Lindsey
- Shire county: Lincolnshire
- Region: East Midlands
- Country: England
- Sovereign state: United Kingdom
- Post town: Barnetby
- Postcode district: DN38
- Police: Lincolnshire
- Fire: Lincolnshire
- Ambulance: East Midlands
- UK Parliament: Gainsborough

Somerby (also known as Somerby juxta Bigby or Somerby by Brigg) is a hamlet and civil parish in the West Lindsey district of Lincolnshire, England. It is situated approximately 4 miles (6 km) east from the town of Brigg and in the ecclesiastical parish of Somerby. Somerby lies in the Lincolnshire Wolds, a designated Area of Outstanding Natural Beauty, between the villages of Bigby and Searby.

== Church ==
The parish church, once described as a "small uninteresting edifice", is a Grade II* listed building. It is dedicated to Saint Margaret and dates from the 13th century with later additions. It was restored in 1884-85 by H M Townsend of Peterborough. An effigy of a knight dating from the late 13th century lies on the south side of the nave. In chancel niches are two marble urns dedicated to two sons of the Weston family who died in the service of the East India Company in 1762 and 1767, respectively. Another Weston, Edward, is commemorated by a large marble wall plaque on the north wall of the chancel. He died in 1770, and was a member of the Privy Council of Ireland.

About 1834 the value of the living, based at the rectory and in the grant of the Crown, was £7. 7s. 6d. A few years earlier, in 1821, the hamlet comprised 13 houses, with a population of 76.

== Somerby Hall and Somerby Grange ==
Somerby Hall was for many years the home of the Weston family, and was purchased in the 1740s by Edward Weston the son of the Bishop of Exeter, the Rt. Rev. Stephen Weston. It was demolished in 1964.

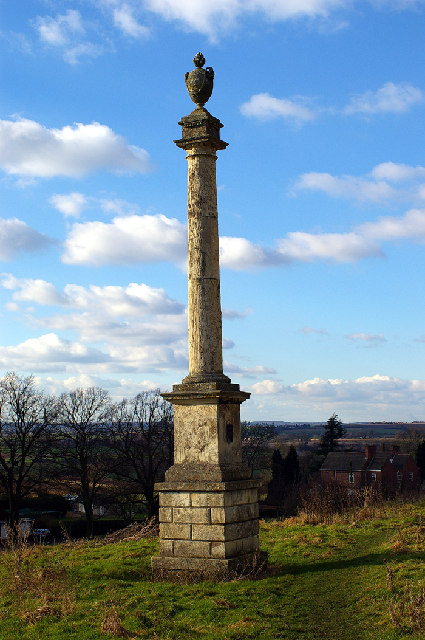
Somerby Monument

Somerby Grange Farmhouse is a Grade II listed building dating from 1756 with 19th-century additions.

== The Monument ==
Overlooking Somerby village, there is a monument that was commissioned in 1770 by Edward Weston and built by John Carr to commemorate 29 years of marriage for Edward and Ann Weston of Somerby Hall. It is an ashlar Doric column topped by an urn. It is Grade II listed.

== Vineyard ==
Today, Somerby has a vineyard. The owners state that they have unearthed several medieval artefacts and Roman coins.

== Community ==
Today, the Ecclesiastical parish of Somerby is part of The North Wolds Group of the Deanery of Yarborough.

The nearest primary schools are in Barnetby le Wold or Grasby
