= John Ussher (died 1749) =

Irish MP for Dungarvan

John Ussher (1703 – 3 January 1749) was an Irish Member of Parliament.

He represented Dungarvan from 1747 to 1749.

His uncle John Ussher, nephew Richard Musgrave and first cousins Beverley Ussher and St George Ussher also served in the Irish House of Commons.
