= Searby cum Owmby =

Civil parish in Lincolnshire, England

Coordinates: 53.53°N 0.39°W

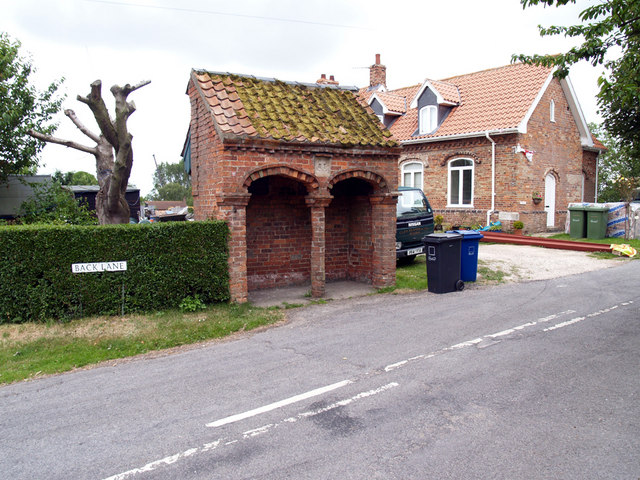
Detached Church Porch, Searby

Searby cum Owmby is a civil parish situated to the north of the West Lindsey district of Lincolnshire, England. The only parish settlements are Searby village and Owmby hamlet, separated by 1,000 yards (900 m), and approximately 4 miles (6 km) east from Brigg and 3.5 miles (6 km) north-east from Caistor. The A1084 Brigg to Caistor road runs through the centre of the parish.

In 1872 White's Directory reported that Searby-with-Owmby was a parish containing the small village of Searby and the adjacent hamlet of Owmby. Searby-with-Owmby had a population of 261 within a parish of 1,860 acres (8 km^{2}). The lady of the manor of Searby was a Mrs Dixon of Holton le Moor, she owning "a great part" of parish land. Smallholders and freeholders held other parish land from Mrs Dixon, who had leased that land from the Dean and Chapter of Lincoln, the appropriators of the rectory and patrons of the living (incumbency). There were 61 acres (0.25 km^{2}) of glebe land—an area of land used to support a parish priest—and a tithe-rent. The earlier tithes—tax income from parishioners derived from their profit on sales, or extraction of produce and animals, typically to the tenth part— had been commuted under the 1836 Tithe Commutation Act. A vicarage was built in 1847 for £800. The parish church of St Nicholas (rebuilt in 1832) was described as "of white brick, with stone dressings, in the Gothic style... with a tower containing five bells and a clock. The latter and two of the bells are the gift of the vicar." New "open oak benches" costing £60, and carved with emblems of the twelve apostles and the twelve tribes of Israel, were added to the church in 1858. The church at the time seated 100. The parish school was built in 1855 for £170, and on the site of the previous vicarage; it was attended by 80 children. Professions and traders resident at Searby in 1872 were the parish vicar, a schoolmistress, the curate of [All Saints' Church] Grasby (1 mile to the southeast), a tailor, a bricklayer, a wheelwright, a blacksmith, a cow keeper, and three farmers. Listed at Owmby in 1872 were five farmers, one of whom was also a land & estate agent.
