= Donal Keegan =

British physician and public servant

Sir Donal Arthur John Keegan, KCVO, OBE (born 1938) is a Northern Irish physician and public servant.

Born in 1938, Keegan studied medicine at Queen's University Belfast, graduating in 1961 with a BSc degree and three years later with an MB BCh BAO degrees. In 1970, he became a consultant physician on the Highland and Western Isles Health Board; five years later, he moved to Altnagelvin Hospital, where he worked until 2003. In 1999, he was appointed an Officer of the Order of the British Empire "for services to rehabilitation services". He has also been a Fellow of the Royal College of Physicians of Ireland since 1973 and a Fellow of the Royal College of Physicians since 1990.

Keegan served on a number of organisations, including as chairman of the Regional Advisory Committee on Cancer from 1997 to 2005. Between 2002 and 2013, he was Lord Lieutenant of the City of Londonderry. For this service, he was appointed a Knight Commander of the Royal Victorian Order in the 2012 Birthday Honours.
