= Belle Isle Castle =

18th-century historic house in County Fermanagh, Northern Ireland

Coordinates: 54.2678°N 7.5564°W

Belle Isle Castle is an 18th-century house on Belle Isle, an island previously known, in Gaelic times, as Ballymacmanus Island or Senadh-Mic-Maghnusa or, simply, Senad. The Belle Isle Estate stretches over 470-acres near Lisbellaw in County Fermanagh, Northern Ireland.

== History ==
Belle Isle Castle originated as a house, first built and inhabited by Sir Ralph Gore, 4th Bt., in about 1700, after his grandfather Sir Paul Gore came into possession of Belle Island. Sir Ralph Gore's grandson, General The 1st Earl of Ross, was born in the house in 1725 and throughout his life further expanded it, adding cottages, a tower, and with the help of designer Thomas Wright, together created the magnificent garden that surrounds the estate and extends to the Lough Erne shore. Upon Lord Ross's death in 1801, the now expanded castle was left to his only surviving child, Lady Mary Hardinge, wife of Sir Richard Hardinge, 1st Baronet.

After Lady Hardinge's death in 1824, and her husband's death two years later, the estate was left to the nephew of Hardinge, The Rev. Sir Charles Hardinge, 2nd Baronet, of Tonbridge, Kent, whom deemed no interest in owning the castle. In 1830, he sold the estate for £68,000 to The Rev. John Grey Porter of Kilskeery, whose descendants owned the property up until 1991. During the ownership, the Porters worked to further expand the castle, adding various office wings and cottage houses. In 1991, Porter descendant Miss Lavinia Baird sold the estate to The 5th Duke of Abercorn, who purchased the estate for his youngest son, Lord Nicholas Hamilton.

In 1991, Belle Isle Castle was expanded and refurbished and is now a hotel and wedding venue. The estate has welcomed the public since 1760 when it began hosting events.

== The building ==
The castle contains a gallery, an overlook tower, a courtyard, and a grand banquet hall. It also has coach houses and cottages, now used as guest rooms. There are English and Irish furnishings, a grand fireplace, works by Russian, Irish and English painters, and floor-to-ceiling windows that overlook the garden, established in the 18th century.

== Grounds ==
Situated behind the castle, the Belle Isle Cookery School opened in 2004.

Also on the grounds are activities available to guests that include shooting, sailing, and hiking.

Since 2018, pine martens were reintroduced, in order to aid with population control of the grey squirrel.

== See also ==
- Castles in Northern Ireland
