= Ralph Gore, 1st Earl of Ross =

Anglo-Irish soldier and politician

General The Right Honourable The Earl of Ross
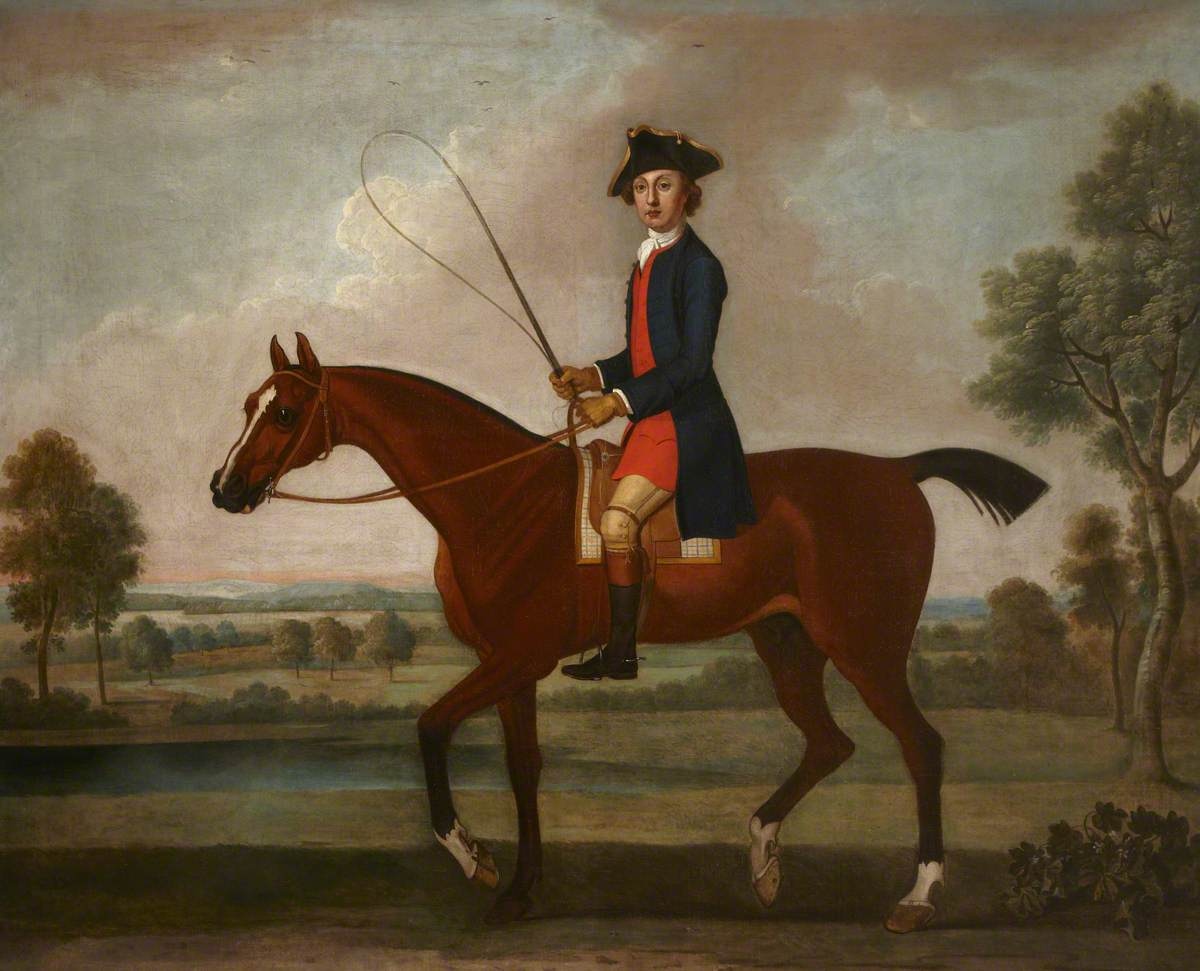
- Equestrian portrait of Ross on his bay hunter
- Born: 23 November 1725
- Died: September 1802 (aged 76)
- Spouse(s): Katherine Conolly (m.1754); Alicia Clements (m.1773)
- Military career
- Allegiance: Great Britain
- Branch: British Army
- Rank: General
- Conflicts: War of the Austrian Succession

Ralph Gore, 1st Earl of Ross (23 November 1725 – September 1802), known as Sir Ralph Gore, 6th Baronet, from 1746 until 1764, subsequently as The Baron Gore until 1768, and then as The Viscount Belleisle until 1772, was an Anglo-Irish soldier, politician and peer.

== Background ==
Born at Belle Isle Castle in County Fermanagh in Ulster, he was the second son of Sir Ralph Gore, 4th Baronet, and his second wife Elizabeth, only daughter of St George Ashe, at that time Church of Ireland Bishop of Clogher. Gore was educated at Trinity College Dublin and, in 1744, he purchased a lieutenancy in the 33rd Regiment of Foot. In 1746, he succeeded his older brother St George as baronet.

== Military career ==
In the middle of the War of the Austrian Succession, Gore joined the regiment in Flanders in 1745 and took over a company. At the Battle of Fontenoy on 11 May, he was hit on his right arm by a shot, however quickly recovered. During the Battle of Lauffeld on 2 July 1747 all his superior officers were killed or severely wounded, so command of the battalion fell to Gore, who performed so well, that on the following day he received the thanks of the British commander, The Duke of Cumberland.

In 1760, he raised the 92nd Regiment of Foot (Donegal Light Infantry) and became its lieutenant-colonel until the regiment's dissolution three years later. Viscount Belleisle, as he was by this time, was promoted to colonel in 1772 and to major-general in 1777. Two years thereafter he was admitted to the Irish general staff and in 1781 obtained colonelship of the 32nd (Cornwall) Regiment of Foot. In the following year, he was made a lieutenant-general and in 1788, during the absence of Sir William Augustus Pitt, was acting Commander-in-Chief, Ireland. Lord Ross, as he was now, was promoted to a full general in 1796.

== Political career ==
In 1747, Gore entered the Irish House of Commons, sitting for County Donegal, the same constituency his father and brother had represented before, until 1764, when on 30 June, he was ennobled in the Peerage of Ireland with the title Baron Gore, of Manor Gore, in the County of Donegal. He took his seat in the Irish House of Lords in 1767 and was created Viscount Belleisle, of Belleisle, in the County of Fermanagh on 25 August 1768. Gore was finally advanced as Earl of Ross, in the County of Fermanagh, on 4 January 1772. He served as High Sheriff of Donegal in 1755 and as High Sheriff of Fermanagh in 1760.

== Family ==
On 23 February 1754, Sir Ralph Gore married, firstly, Katherine, eldest daughter of William Conolly and Lady Anne Wentworth. After her death in 1771, Lord Belleisle, as he was by this time, remarried Alicia Clements, youngest daughter of Nathaniel Clements and Hannah Gore, on 22 August 1773. His only son by his second marriage predeceased him in 1789. Alicia died in 1795 and was buried, like her son, at Clifton Church in Bristol. Lord Ross, as he was now, survived her until 1802 and was succeeded in the baronetcy by his nephew Ralph; his other titles became extinct.

== Belle Isle ==
Belle Isle (previously known, in Gaelic times, as Ballymacmanus Island or Senadh-Mic-Maghnusa or, simply, Senad), near Lisbellaw, had been in the Gore family for generations, but it was Lord Ross's father who built the castle. His son, who was born there, spent many years improving and expanding Belle Isle Castle and creating a magnificent garden.

Parliament of Ireland
Preceded by Sir St George Gore-St George, 5th Bt; Andrew Knox	Member of Parliament for County Donegal; 1747–1764; With: Andrew Knox	Succeeded by Robert Clements; Andrew Knox
Military offices
New regiment	Lieutenant-Colonel of the 92nd Regiment of Foot (Donegal Light Infantry); 1760–1763	Regiment disbanded
Preceded by William Amherst	Colonel of the 32nd (Cornwall) Regiment of Foot; 1781–1802	Succeeded by James Ogilvie
Peerage of Ireland
New creation	Earl of Ross; 1772–1802	Extinct
New creation	Viscount Belleisle; 1768–1802	Extinct
New creation	Baron Gore; 1764–1802	Extinct
Baronetage of Ireland
Preceded by St George Gore-St George	Baronet (of Magherabegg); 1746–1802	Succeeded by Ralph Gore
