= Nathaniel Clements =

Irish politician and financier (1705–1777)

Nathaniel Clements (1705 – May 1777) was an Irish politician and financial figure, important in the political and financial administration of Ireland in the mid-18th century.

== Early history ==
Clements was the fifth son of Robert Clements (1664–1722). He married Hannah Gore, daughter of William Gore, D.D., Dean of Down, on 31 January 1730.

== Career ==
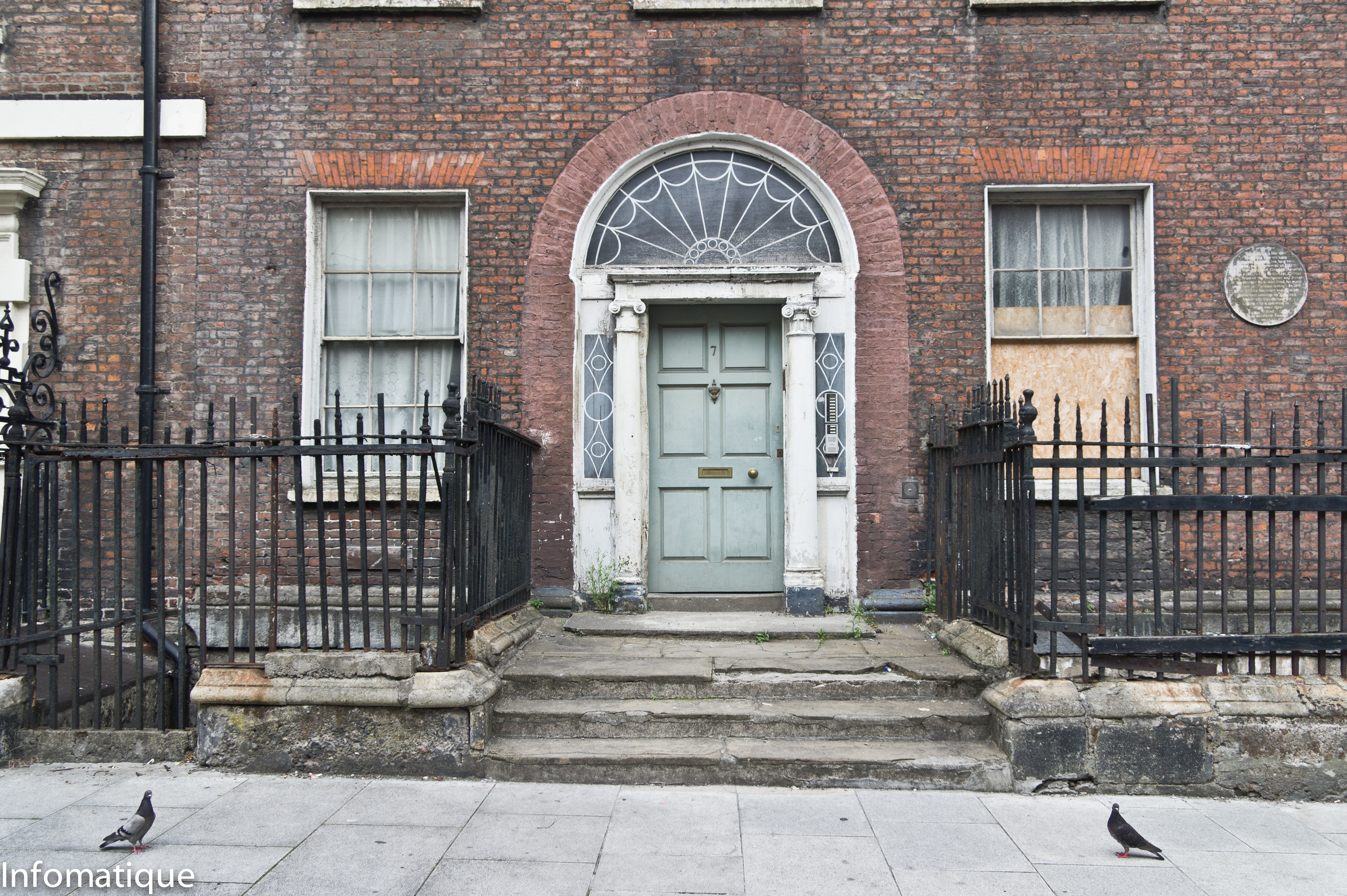
Entrance to Clements' house where he lived many years in "Parisian luxury" 7 Henrietta Street, Dublin July 2011

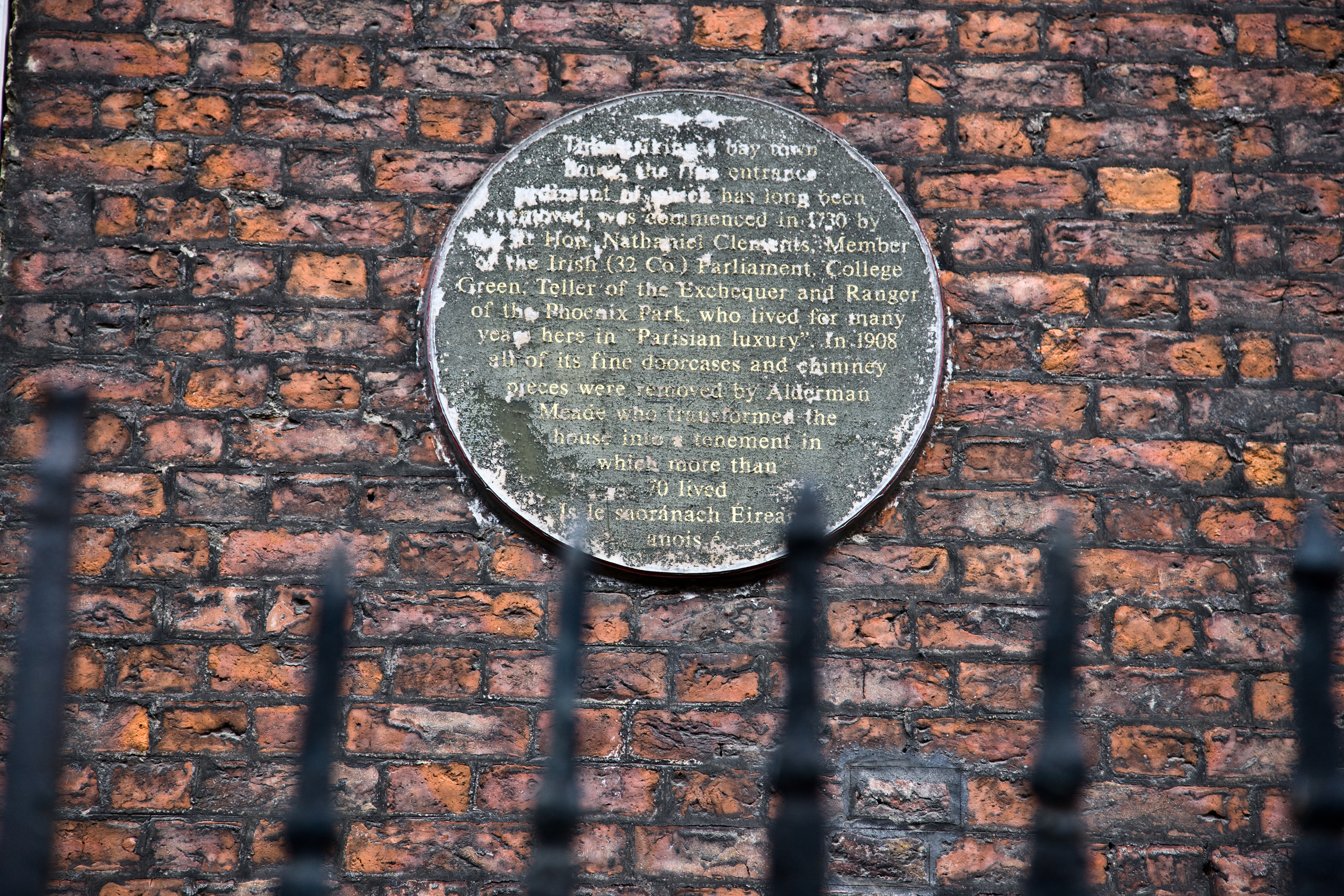

Clements became Member of Parliament (MP) for Duleek in 1727 under the patronage of Luke Gardiner, a powerful political and business figure in Dublin. He commenced as a junior at the Irish Treasury in 1720 and held extensive offices there. He became the main financial manager of the British and Irish Government in Ireland during the period, and was de facto Minister for Finance from 1740 to 1777. He assumed the offices of Deputy Vice-Treasurer and Deputy Paymaster General on Gardiner's retirement in 1755. In 1761, Clements was returned for Cavan Borough in, holding this seat until 1768. In this year, he was elected for Roscommon as well as County Leitrim, and chose to sit for the latter. In 1776, Clements stood for again for Cavan Borough as well as Carrick and represented the latter constituency until his death in 1777.

== Property development ==
Clements was appointed by King George II to the office of Chief Ranger of the Phoenix Park and Master of Game and built the Ranger's lodge (subsequently the Viceregal Lodge) to his own design in 1751. He had an extensive property portfolio, including Abbotstown, County Dublin, estates in County Leitrim and County Cavan. He was a developer of property in Georgian Dublin, including part of Henrietta Street where he lived at No. 7 from 1734 to 1757, and Sackville Mall (now Upper O'Connell Street).

He was one of the richest commoners in Ireland, notwithstanding his involvement in a failed banking venture in 1759.

== Charitable activities ==
Clements was involved in many charitable activities including Dr Steevens' Hospital, the Erasmus Smith Educational Foundation, the Royal Hospital Kilmainham for retired soldiers, and others.

== Family ==
Nathaniel Clements and Hannah Gore had six children:

1. Robert Clements (1732–1804), created Earl of Leitrim in 1795, elected as an Irish representative peer in 1800
2. Rt. Hon. Henry Theophilus Clements, MP
3. Elizabeth, m. 1750, Francis Burton, second Baron Conyngham
4. Hannah, m. 1752, George Montgomery, Ballyconnell, MP
5. Catherine, m. Eyre Massey, 1st Baron Clarina
6. Alice, m. 1773, Gen. Sir Ralph Gore, sixth Baronet, created Earl of Ross.

== See also ==
- Irish House of Commons
- Áras an Uachtaráin

Parliament of Ireland
Preceded by Thomas Trotter; Stephen Ram	Member of Parliament for Duleek; 1728–1761; With: Stephen Ram 1728–1747; Thomas Cooley 1747–1755; Henry Monck 1755–1761	Succeeded by Andrew Ram; Henry Monck
Preceded by Cosby Nesbitt; Edward Weston	Member of Parliament for Cavan Borough; 1761–1768; With: Cosby Nesbitt	Succeeded by Cosby Nesbitt; Thomas Nesbitt
Preceded by Sir Marcus Lowther-Crofton; Sir FitzGerald Aylmer	Member of Parliament for Roscommon; 1768–1769; With: Robert Sandford	Succeeded by Robert Tighe; Robert Sandford
Preceded by Theophilus Jones; John Wynne	Member of Parliament for County Leitrim; 1768–1776; With: William Gore 1768–1769; William Gore 1789–1776	Succeeded by Henry Theophilus Clements; Theophilus Jones
Preceded by Henry Sandford; Robert Clements	Member of Parliament for Carrick; 1776–1777; With: Robert Clements	Succeeded by Edward Sneyd; Robert Clements
Preceded by Thomas Nesbitt; Henry Theophilus Clements	Member of Parliament for Cavan Borough; 1776–1777; With: Thomas Nesbitt	Succeeded by Thomas Nesbitt; John Clements
