= John McCausland (politician) =

- Born: 14 May 1735; Strabane
- Died: November 1804 (aged 69)
- Occupation: Member of the Parliament of Ireland
- Years active: 1768-1776

John McCausland (1735 – November 1804) was an Irish Member of Parliament.

== Early years ==
He was born in Strabane on 14 May 1735 to Oliver McCausland and Anne Jane Hamilton of Strabane.

== Parliament ==
McCausland represented County Donegal in the Parliament of Ireland from 1768 to 1776.

== Family life ==
He had married Elizabet Span, daughter of William Span in Ballmacove on 29 January 1757. They had 3 children: Oliver (born 6 November 1767), William (born 1759) and Catherine (born 1761). His daughter Catherine married William Plunket, 1st Baron Plunket, the crown prosecutor at the trial of Robert Emmet, and later Lord Chancellor of Ireland.

== Death ==
He died in November 1804, aged 69.

Parliament of Ireland
Preceded by Robert Clements; Andrew Knox	Member of Parliament for County Donegal; 1768–1776; With: Alexander Montgomery	Succeeded by Robert Clements; Alexander Montgomery
