= John Wynne (1720–1778) =

John Wynne (1720 – January 1778) was an Irish politician.

He sat in the House of Commons of Ireland from 1751 to 1776, as a Member of Parliament for Sligo 1751–60, for County Leitrim 1761–68, and for Sligo again 1768–76.

Parliament of Ireland
Preceded by Owen Wynne I Francis Ormsby	Member of Parliament for Sligo; 1751–1761; With: Owen Wynne I William Ormsby	Succeeded by William Ormsby; John Folliot
Preceded by William Gore; Hugh Crofton	Member of Parliament for County Leitrim; 1761–1768; With: Theophilus Jones	Succeeded by Nathaniel Clements; William Gore
Preceded by Robert Scott; William Ormsby	Member of Parliament for Sligo; 1768–1776; With: William Ormsby	Succeeded by Owen Wynne II; Richard Hely-Hutchinson
