= Owen Wynne (1687–1756) =

Irish politician

Owen Wynne (1687 – 1 June 1756) was an Irish Member of Parliament. He sat in the House of Commons of Ireland from 1713 to 1756.

He was an MP for Sligo from 1713 until 1756.

He resided at Hazelwood House, Sligo and number 3 Henrietta Street, Dublin.

Parliament of Ireland
Preceded by Samuel Walton; Percy Gethin	Member of Parliament for Sligo; 1713–1756; With: Samuel Burton 1713–27; Francis Ormsby 1727–51; John Wynne from 1751	Succeeded by John Wynne; William Ormsby
