= Hugh Crofton =

Irish politician

Hugh Crofton (died 20 October 1767) was an Irish politician.

Croften was the Member of Parliament for County Leitrim in the Irish House of Commons between 1743 and 1760. He was the father of Sir Morgan Crofton, 1st Baronet.

1753 Revenue Dispute medal awarded to Hugh Crofton

Parliament of Ireland
Preceded by William Gore; Theophilus Jones	Member of Parliament for Leitrim; 1743–1760; With: William Gore	Succeeded by Theophilus Jones; John Wynne
