= John Ussher (died 1741) =

Irish soldier and Member of Parliament

John Ussher (circa 1682 – 1741) was an Irish soldier and Member of Parliament.

He was the son of Lieutenant-Colonel Beverley Ussher by his wife Grace, daughter of Sir Richard Osborne, 2nd Baronet. His nephews John Ussher and Beverley Ussher were also MPs.

He reached the rank of captain in General Lumley's Regiment of Horse, seeing action at the Battle of Blenheim.

On 20 December 1714 he married Mary St George, daughter and heiress of Sir George St George, later Lord St George.

In November 1715 he was elected to the Irish House of Commons for his father-in-law's former constituency of Carrick, sitting until his death. He later also served as Governor of Galway and, from 1735, Vice-Admiral of Connaught.

His son St George Ussher succeeded to his seat in Parliament. He later adopted the surname St George and was created Baron St George. His daughter Olivia married Arthur French and their son Christopher adopted the surname St George in 1774; he was the grandfather of Christopher St George.
