= Owmby =

Hamlet in Lincolnshire, England

Coordinates: 53.530411°N 0.375391°W

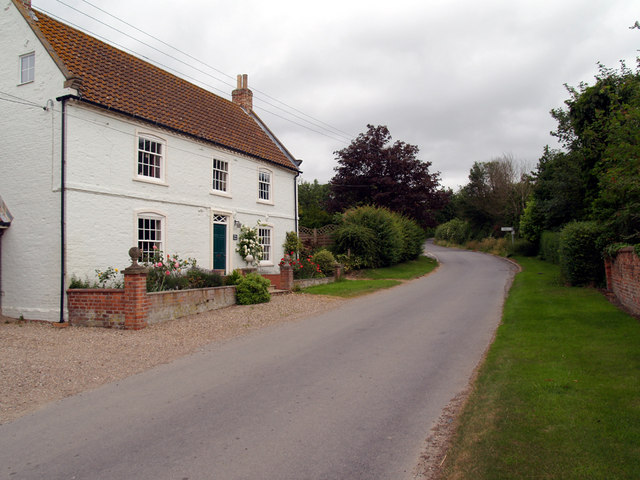
- Tithe House, Owmby

- Location within Lincolnshire
- OS grid reference: TA077049
  - London: 135 mi (217 km) S
- Civil parish: Searby cum Owmby
- District: West Lindsey
- Shire county: Lincolnshire
- Region: East Midlands
- Country: England
- Sovereign state: United Kingdom
- Post town: Barnetby
- Postcode district: DN38
- Police: Lincolnshire
- Fire: Lincolnshire
- Ambulance: East Midlands
- UK Parliament: Gainsborough

Owmby is a hamlet in the civil parish of Searby cum Owmby, in the West Lindsey district of Lincolnshire, England. It is less than 1 mile (1.6 km) south from the A1084 road, 3 miles (5 km) north-west from Caistor, 4 miles (6 km) south-east from Brigg, and in the Lincolnshire Wolds, a designated Area of Outstanding Natural Beauty. The parish village of Searby is less than 1 mile to the north-east.

== History ==
According to A Dictionary of British Place Names, Owm could be "a farmstead or a village of a man called Authunn" or Old Scandinavian for "uncultivated land or deserted farm", and "by", a "farmstead, village or settlement".

Owmby is mentioned in the Domesday Book of 1086 as " Odenebi", in the Lindsey Hundred, and the Wapentake of Yarborough. It comprised 19 households, 7 villagers, 2 smallholders and 11 freemen, with 5 ploughlands, a meadow of 40 acres (0.16 km^{2}), and a mill. In 1066 the Lord of the manor was Grimkel. By 1086 a man named William was Lord, and William of Percy was Tenant-in-chief. The Domesday entry does not indicate the two Williams are the same man.

Remains of a possible medieval settlement defined by identifiable earthworks of crofts (homesteads with land) lie 80 yards (73 m) east from the junction of the road to Searby with Station Lane and Owmby Hill.

The 1872 White's Directory listed five farmers at Owmby, one of whom was also a land & estate agent.

In 1885 Kelly's Directory noted five farmers and Owmby Mount, a now Grade II listed c.1840 country house at the north-west edge of the hamlet. Living at Owmby Mount in 1885 was the Caistor Rural Sanitation Authority inspector of nuisances and registrar of births marriages and deaths for Caistor sub-district.

A further Owmby listed building is the Grade II Tithe House on Station Lane, a late 18th-century farmhouse with a 20th-century extension.
