= Stephen Weston =

English bishop and educator

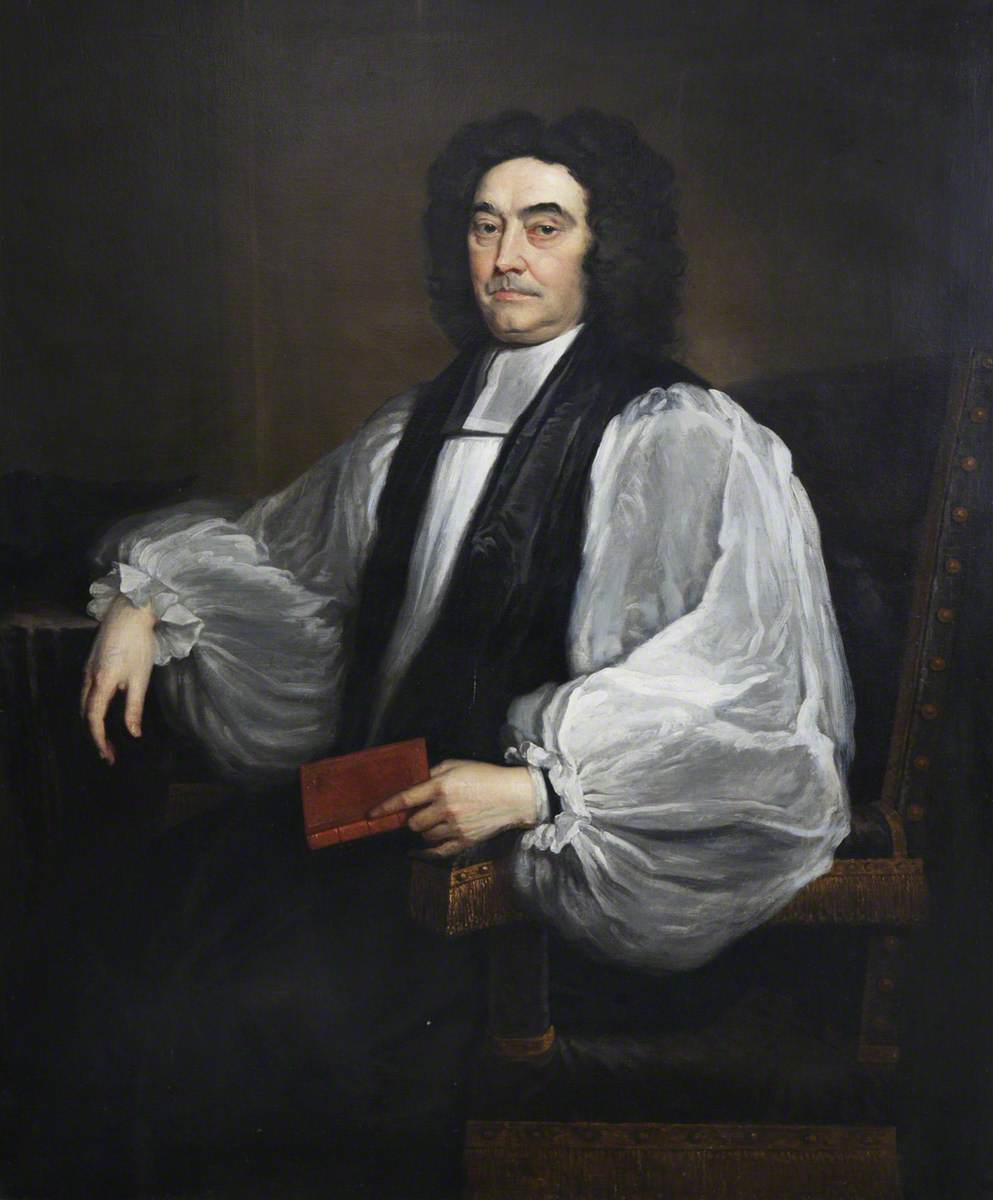
Stephen Weston by Arthur Pond

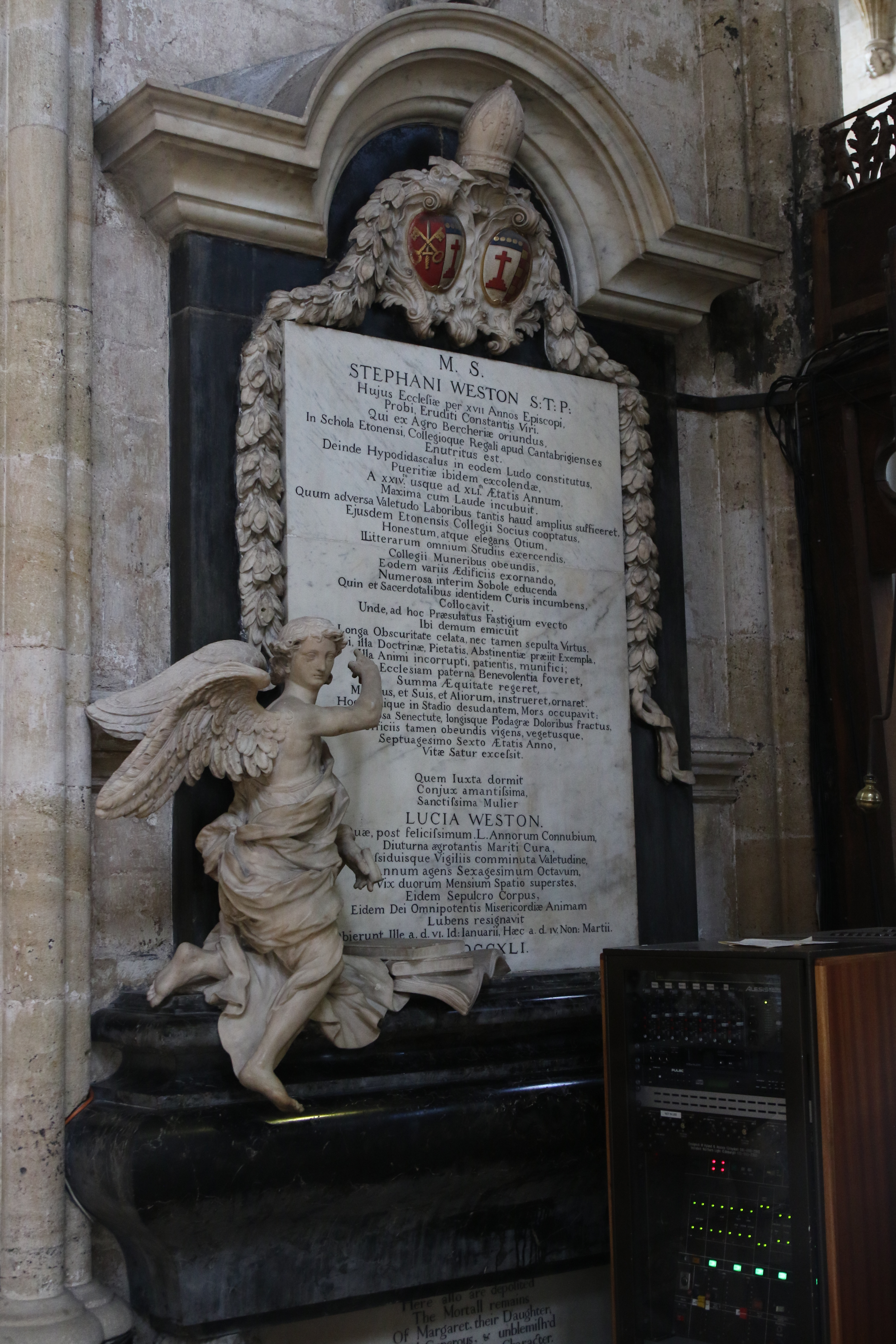
Memorial in Exeter Cathedral

Stephen Weston (1665–1742) was an English bishop and educator.

== Life ==
He was born at Farnborough. He was educated at Eton College and King's College, Cambridge, where he was admitted in 1683, graduated B.A. in 1687, M.A. in 1690, and became a Fellow. He was an assistant-master at Eton from about 1690, and second master, 1693 to 1707. He was Fellow of Eton in 1707, and was awarded the degree of D.D. at Oxford, in 1711. He served as canon of Ely, from 1715 to 1717; and became vicar of Mapledurham in 1716.

He became Bishop of Exeter in 1724, through the influence of Robert Walpole who was a pupil of his at Eton. In 1732 he also assumed the title of Archdeacon of Exeter. He has a monument in the south aisle of Exeter Cathedral.

== Family ==
His second son was the politician Edward Weston.

The physician Sir George Baker was his grandson.

== Notes ==
Church of England titles
| Preceded by Lancelot Blackburne | Bishop of Exeter; 1724 – 1742 | Succeeded by Nicholas Clagett |
