= Oliver St George =

Irish politician

Oliver St George (1661 – 15 April 1731) was an Irish politician.

The son of Sir Oliver St George, 1st Baronet and Olivia Beresford, he married Mary, daughter of Thomas Knox and Mary Bruce, in 1701.

He was elected to the Irish House of Commons for both Carrick and Dungannon in September 1703, and chose to sit for Carrick. In the next general election in November 1713 he was elected again for Dungannon, and sat there until his death. He was appointed to the Irish Privy Council on 9 October 1714.
