= Theophilus Clements =

Irish politician

Theophilus Clements was an Irish politician. He was born in County Meath and educated at Trinity College, Dublin. Clements represented Cavan Borough from 1729 to 1745.
