= George St George, 1st Baron St George =

Anglo-Irish politician, soldier and peer

George St George, 1st Baron St George (c. 1658 – 4 August 1735) was an Anglo-Irish politician, soldier and peer.

St George was the son of Sir Oliver St George, 1st Baronet and Olivia Beresford, daughter of Michael Beresford, of Coleraine, County Londonderry.

He represented County Roscommon in the Irish House of Commons between at least 1692 and 1715. He succeeded his father in the baronetcy in 1695. He held the post of Vice-Admiral of Connaught from 1696 to his death. In 1715 he was elevated to the Peerage of Ireland as Baron St George, of Hatley Saint George in the Counties of Roscommon and Leitrim.

St George gained experience as a soldier. In 1689 he took command of Solomon Richards' infantry regiment which had just taken part in a failed expedition under John Cunningham to rescue the besieged city of Derry, the failure of which led to the dismissal of both Cunningham and Richards. Under St George, the regiment took part in the more successful relief operation of General Percy Kirke in July 1689.

== Family ==
Lord St George married Margaret Skeffington, daughter of John Skeffington, 2nd Viscount Massereene, in 1681. They had two daughters. St George died in August 1735 when the baronetcy and barony became extinct. One of his daughters, the Honourable, Mary St George, married John Ussher. Their son St George assumed the surname of St George and was created Baron St George in 1763.

Peerage of Ireland
New creation	Baron St George; 1715–1735	Extinct
Baronetage of Ireland
Preceded by Oliver St George	Baronet (of Carrickdrumrusk); 1695–1735	Extinct
