= John Reynolds (Leitrim politician) =

Irish politician

John Reynolds (1670–1699) was an Irish Member of Parliament.

== Biography ==
He was the son of James Reynolds of Loughscur, County Leitrim, and was educated at Kilkenny College and Trinity College, Dublin. A major in the Army, he was elected to Parliament for County Leitrim in 1692 and 1695. In 1695 he married Jane, daughter of Captain Edward Pottinger of Carrickfergus; they had two children, John and Mary. He died in 1699 and his widow later remarried, firstly to Sir Thomas Butler, 3rd Baronet, and secondly to Agmondisham Vesey.
