= List of vice-admirals of Connaught =

Vice Admiral of Connaught
- Country: United Kingdom
- Type: Naval administration
- Role: Admiralty court and Naval Jurisdiction.

This is a list of the vice-admirals of Connaught, the province of Connacht in the west of Ireland.

Prior to 1585 the whole of Ireland was served by a single vice-admiral, namely Thomas Radcliffe, 3rd Earl of Sussex (1558–1565), Gerald Fitzgerald, 11th Earl of Kildare (1564–1573) and Thomas Butler, 10th Earl of Ormonde (1585). Separate vice-admiralties were then established for Munster in 1585, for Ulster by 1602, for Leinster by 1612 and for Connaught by 1615.

== Vice-admirals of Connaught ==
Source (1615–1661)

Source (1661 onwards)

- 1615–1627 Sir Oliver St John
- 1628–1639 Sir George St George
- no appointment known
- 1660 Sir Oliver St George
- 1691–1695 Sir Oliver St George, 1st Baronet
- 1695–1696 John Eyres (Revoked 1696)
- 1696–1735 Sir George St George, 2nd Baronet
- 1735–?1741 John Ussher (died 1741)
- 1747–?1768 Stratford Eyre
- 1768–>1788 Charles Molyneux, 1st Earl of Sefton (died 1794)
- 1794– William Molyneux, 2nd Earl of Sefton (died 1838)
- 1822– Richard Le Poer Trench, 2nd Earl of Clancarty (died 1837)
- <1841–>1847: Marquess of Clanricarde (died 1874)
- 1889– George Bingham, 4th Earl of Lucan (died 1914)
