= Charles Clements, 5th Earl of Leitrim =

Irish noble (1879–1952)

Charles Clements, 5th Earl of Leitrim (23 June 1879 – 9 June 1952), styled Viscount Clements until 1892, was an Irish nobleman and Unionist. He was commissioned into the British Army after college, and served in the Second Boer War, during which he was made a prisoner of war in the debacle at Lindley, Free State. He was appointed Lord Lieutenant of the City of Londonderry in 1904, shortly after the close of the war. During the Home Rule crisis, he commanded the Ulster Volunteers in County Donegal and smuggled arms into the country for their use. He held a commission in the Royal Inniskilling Fusiliers during World War I, recruiting Volunteers into the regiment, and served as Private Secretary to fellow-Unionist Walter Hume Long, Secretary of State for the Colonies. The Earl had no children by either of his two marriages; his only heir, his brother Francis, went to America under an assumed name, disappeared, and was pronounced dead in 1917. Accordingly, Leitrim's titles became extinct on his death in 1952.

== Biography ==
Clements was the eldest son of Robert Clements, 4th Earl of Leitrim, whom he succeeded in 1892. He was educated at Eton and Christ Church, Oxford. Leitrim was commissioned a second lieutenant in the 5th (Militia) Battalion, Rifle Brigade (The Prince Consort's Own) on 9 February 1898 and promoted to lieutenant on 7 December 1898. Following the outbreak of the Second Boer War in late 1899, he volunteered for active service in the Imperial Yeomanry, where he was commissioned a lieutenant on 3 March 1900, leaving Liverpool for South Africa on the SS Cymric later the same month. He transferred to a regular army commission in the 9th (Queen's Royal) Lancers as a second lieutenant on 21 April 1900. While serving with the 13th Imperial Yeomanry, Leitrim was captured at Lindley. He was promoted lieutenant in the 9th Lancers on 5 July 1901, but returned to the United Kingdom when the war was drawing to a close in March 1902, and resigned his commission on 21 June 1902.

Leitrim married at St Andrew's church, Nuthurst, on 22 October 1902 Violet Lina Henderson, the daughter of Robert Henderson, a director of the Bank of England, and sister of the ambassador Sir Nevile Henderson. He was appointed Lord Lieutenant of the City of Londonderry in 1904.

Leitrim commanded the Ulster Volunteer Force in County Donegal, and arranged to run guns into the county in his yacht, SS Ganiamore, in 1913. During World War I, Leitrim was commissioned a major in the 11th Service Battalion, Royal Inniskilling Fusiliers but resigned due to ill health on 10 January 1917. He was Private Secretary to the Secretary of State for the Colonies, Walter Hume Long, in 1917.

Later in life, he divorced Violet, and married Hon. Anne Mary Chaloner Vanneck, sister of William Vanneck, 5th Baron Huntingfield, on 29 April 1939. Leitrim had no children by either of his marriages. His sometime heir presumptive, his brother Hon. Francis Patrick Clements, disappeared in 1907, and was declared dead in 1917. Reports from the New York Times dated 12 July 1907, and 20 August 1911, suggested that he had gone to the US and worked as a stoker. The Earl was said to have spent thousands of dollars trying to establish his whereabouts. With no heir, the Earldom of Leitrim became extinct upon the Earl's death in 1952.

Honorary titles
Preceded by William Tillie	Lord Lieutenant of the City of Londonderry; 1904–1921	Succeeded by Charles Fitzpatrick Cooke
Peerage of Ireland
Preceded by Robert Clements	Earl of Leitrim; 1892–1952	Extinct
