= Theophilus Jones (1666–1742) =

Irish politician

Theophilus Jones (2 September 1666 – 14 March 1742) was an Irish Member of Parliament. He sat in the House of Commons of Ireland from 1692 until his death in 1742.

He lived in Headfort, near Drumsna, County Leitrim.

He was a Member of Parliament for Sligo from 1692 to 1695, and then for County Leitrim from 1695 to 1742.

His grandson Theophilus Jones (1729–1811) was a member of Parliament and a Privy Councillor.

Parliament of Ireland
Preceded by ??	Member of Parliament for Sligo; 1692 – 1695; With: Percy Gethin	Succeeded by Percy Gethin; Roger Smith
Preceded by John Reynolds; James Wynne	Member of Parliament for County Leitrim; 1695 – 1742; With: John Reynolds to 1703; William Gore 1703–30; William Gore II from 1730	Succeeded by William Gore II; Hugh Crofton
