= 92nd Regiment of Foot (Donegal Light Infantry) =

- Active: 1760–1763
- Country: Kingdom of Great Britain (1707–1800)
- Branch: British Army
- Type: Infantry

Commanders
- Colonel of the Regiment: Gen. Sir Ralph Gore, 1st Earl of Ross

The 92nd Regiment of Foot (Donegal Light Infantry) (1760–1763) was a short-lived infantry regiment in the British Army which was raised in Ireland in 1760 by the Earl of Ross at his own expense to help counter the Spanish Invasion of Portugal of 1762, an offshoot of the Seven Years' War.

The colonel-commandant of the regiment was General Sir Ralph Gore, 1st Earl of Ross himself.

After being posted to the Iberian Peninsula in 1762, the regiment was disbanded in England following the Treaty of Paris in 1763.
