= Searby, Lincolnshire =

Village in the West Lindsey district of Lincolnshire, England

Coordinates: 53.537760°N 0.38399°W

Searby
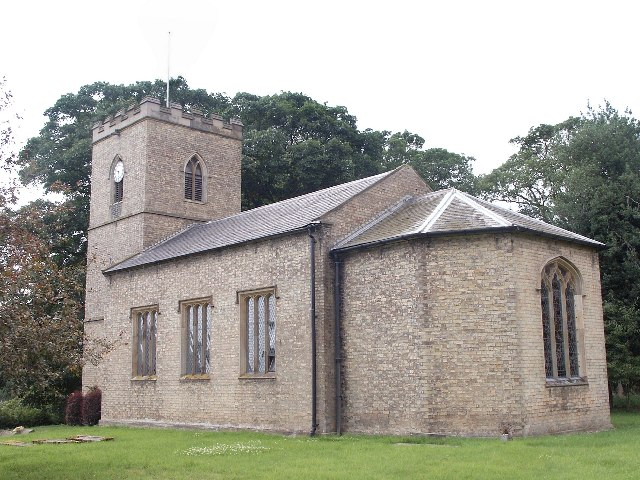
- Church of St Nicholas, Searby

- Location within Lincolnshire
- Population: (2001)
- OS grid reference: TA071057
  - London: 140 mi (230 km) S
- Civil parish: Searby cum Owmby
- District: West Lindsey
- Shire county: Lincolnshire
- Region: East Midlands
- Country: England
- Sovereign state: United Kingdom
- Post town: Barnetby
- Postcode district: DN38
- Police: Lincolnshire
- Fire: Lincolnshire
- Ambulance: East Midlands
- UK Parliament: Gainsborough

Searby is a village in the West Lindsey district of Lincolnshire, England, situated 4 miles (6.4 km) south-east from Brigg and 5 miles (8.0 km) north-east from Caistor. The village is in the civil parish of Searby cum Owmby, between the villages of Somerby and Grasby, and in the Lincolnshire Wolds, a designated Area of Outstanding Natural Beauty. Less than 1 mile (1.6 km) to the south is the parish hamlet of Owmby.

Searby is mentioned in the Domesday Book as "Seurebi", in the Lindsey Hundred, and the Wapentake of Yarborough. It comprised 23 households, 4 villagers, 2 smallholders and 15 freemen, with 5 ploughlands, a meadow of 80 acres (0.32 km^{2}), a mill, and a church. In 1066 the Lord of the manor was Rolf son of Skjaldvor. After 1086 Lordship transferred to Durand Malet, who also became Tenant-in-chief.

Saint Nicholas church is a Grade II listed building. It was rebuilt in 1832, although the base of the tower is of stone and could be medieval.

In 1872 White's Directory stated that the parish church was "of white brick, with stone dressings, in the Gothic style... with a tower containing five bells and a clock. The latter and two of the bells are the gift of the vicar." New "open oak benches" costing £60, and carved with emblems of the twelve apostles and the twelve tribes of Israel, were added to the church in 1858. The church at the time seated 100. The Dean and Chapter of Lincoln were the appropriators of the rectory and patrons of the living (incumbency). A vicarage was built in 1847 for £800. The parish National School was built in 1855 for £170 on the site of the previous vicarage; it was attended by 80 children. Professions and traders resident at Searby in 1872 were the parish vicar, a schoolmistress, the curate of [All Saints' Church] Grasby (1 mile to the southeast), a tailor, a bricklayer, a wheelwright, a blacksmith, a cow keeper, and three farmers.

The deserted medieval village of Audewelle was reputedly in the vicinity.
