= Sir Oliver St George, 1st Baronet =

Irish politician

Sir Oliver St George, 1st Baronet (died October 1695) was an Irish Member of Parliament. (Note: His name is spelt in different ways including Sir Oliver St. George, Sir Oliver Saint-George and Sir Oliver Saint George)

== Biography ==
Oliver St George was the son of Sir George St George of Carrickdrumrusk and Katherine Gifford, and grandson of Richard St George, Clarenceux King of Arms,

In February 1658 he was knighted by Henry Cromwell, Lord Deputy of Ireland (this honour passed into oblivion with the Restoration in May 1660). In January 1659 Lord Montgomery, Sir Oliver and others took control of Dublin Castle and made Jones and two of his colleagues prisoners. They set up a Council of Officers assumed the government of Ireland, and summoned a Convention of Estates (or Convention Parliament). The Convention accepted Charles's Declaration of Breda and proclaimed him King of Ireland.

After the Restoration St George was knighted by Charles II in Whitehall on 11 July 1660, and was appointed a Commissioner of Irish Affairs. Later the same year on 5 September he was created a Baronet, of Carrickdrumrusk in the county of Leitrim, in the Baronetage of England. King Charles II also made him a member of the Irish Privy Council.

From 1691 to his death he held the post of Vice-Admiral of Connaught.

Between 1692 and 1693 Sir Oliver represented County Galway in the Irish House of Commons. He died in October 1695.

== Family ==
St George married, before 1652, Olivia, widow of George Thornton and daughter of Michael Beresford of Coleraine and Mary, daughter of John Leak, by whom he had four children.

He was succeeded in the baronetcy by his son George St George, who was later created Baron St George. Another son, Oliver St George, was also appointed to the Irish Privy Council. He also had two daughters, Olivia and Katherine. Olivia married firstly after 1693, as his fourth wife, the prominent landowner and statesman Sir Robert Colville of Newtown House, Newtownards, who died in 1697, secondly Pierce Butler, 4th Viscount Ikerrin, who died in 1711, and thirdly a Mr. Wroth, or Booth of Epsom, Surrey. She died in 1724. Katherine married Sir Edward Crofton, 2nd Baronet, by whom she had two sons, and died c.1689/90.

== Sources ==
- Burke, John; Burke, Sir Bernard (1838). A Genealogical and Heraldic History of the Extinct and Dormant Baronetcies of England, Ireland and Scotland (2 ed.). J. R. Smith. p. 461.
- Cokayne, George Edward (1903). Complete baronetage: 1649–1664. Vol. 3. Exeter: W. Pollard & Company. p. 120.
- Brewer, James Norris (1825). The beauties of Ireland: being original delineations, topographical, historical, and biographical, of each county. London: Sherwood, Jones and Company.
- Lundy, Darryl (23 January 2009). "Rt. Hon. Oliver St. George". p. 33204 § 332040.
- Lundy, Darryl (22 August 2013). "Sir Oliver St. George, 1st Bt". p. 12957 § 129568.
- Mosley, Charles, ed. (2003). Burke's Peerage, Baronetage & Knightage (107th in 3 volumes ed.). Wilmington, Delaware, U.S.A.: Burke's Peerage (Genealogical Books).

Baronetage of Ireland
New creation	Baronet (of Carrickdrumrusk); 1660–1695	Succeeded by George St George
