= Lord Lieutenant of the City of Londonderry =

Ceremonial officer in Londonderry, Northern Ireland

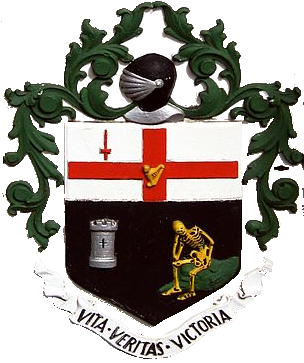
- Derry City Coat of Arms
- Incumbent; Ian Crowe since 12 January 2023
- Appointer: King Charles III
- Inaugural holder: William Tillie
- Formation: 1900

People to have served as Lord Lieutenant of the City of Londonderry (originally formally "County of the City of Londonderry", later the "County Borough of Londonderry") include:

== County of the City of Londonderry ==
- William Tillie: 20 February 1900 – 1904
- Charles Clements, 5th Earl of Leitrim: 29 June 1904 – February 1921
- Thomas Fitzpatrick Cooke: 1 March 1921 – 1926
- William Maxwell Scott Moore: 26 November 1926 – 1939

== County Borough of Londonderry ==
- Sir Basil McFarland, 2nd Baronet: 20 September 1939 – 1975
- Thomas Fitzpatrick Cooke: 13 June 1975 – 1985
- James Eaton: 15 April 1986 – 2002
- Donal Keegan: 2 August 2002 – 8 October 2013
- Angela Garvey: 9 October 2013 – March 2022
- Ian Crowe: 12 January 2023 - Present

== See also ==
- Lord Lieutenant of County Londonderry
