= St George St George, 1st Baron St George =

Irish politician

St George Ussher St George, 1st Baron Saint George (circa 1715 – 2 January 1775), was an Irish politician.

Born St George Ussher, he was the son of John Ussher by his wife Mary St George, daughter of the 1st Baron St George.

On 25 May 1734, by Royal Licence, his name was legally changed to St. George Ussher St. George. In 1737, he held the office of High Sheriff of County Roscommon.

He succeeded his father as Member of Parliament for Carrick in the Irish House of Commons from 1741 until he was raised to the Irish House of Lords. He was created Baron Saint George of Hatley St George, in the Peerage of Ireland, on 19 April 1763; this was a revival of the title held by his grandfather.

He married Elizabeth Dominick, daughter of Sir Christopher Dominick (died 1743), a wealthy Dublin doctor who began the laying out of Dominick Street, Dublin.

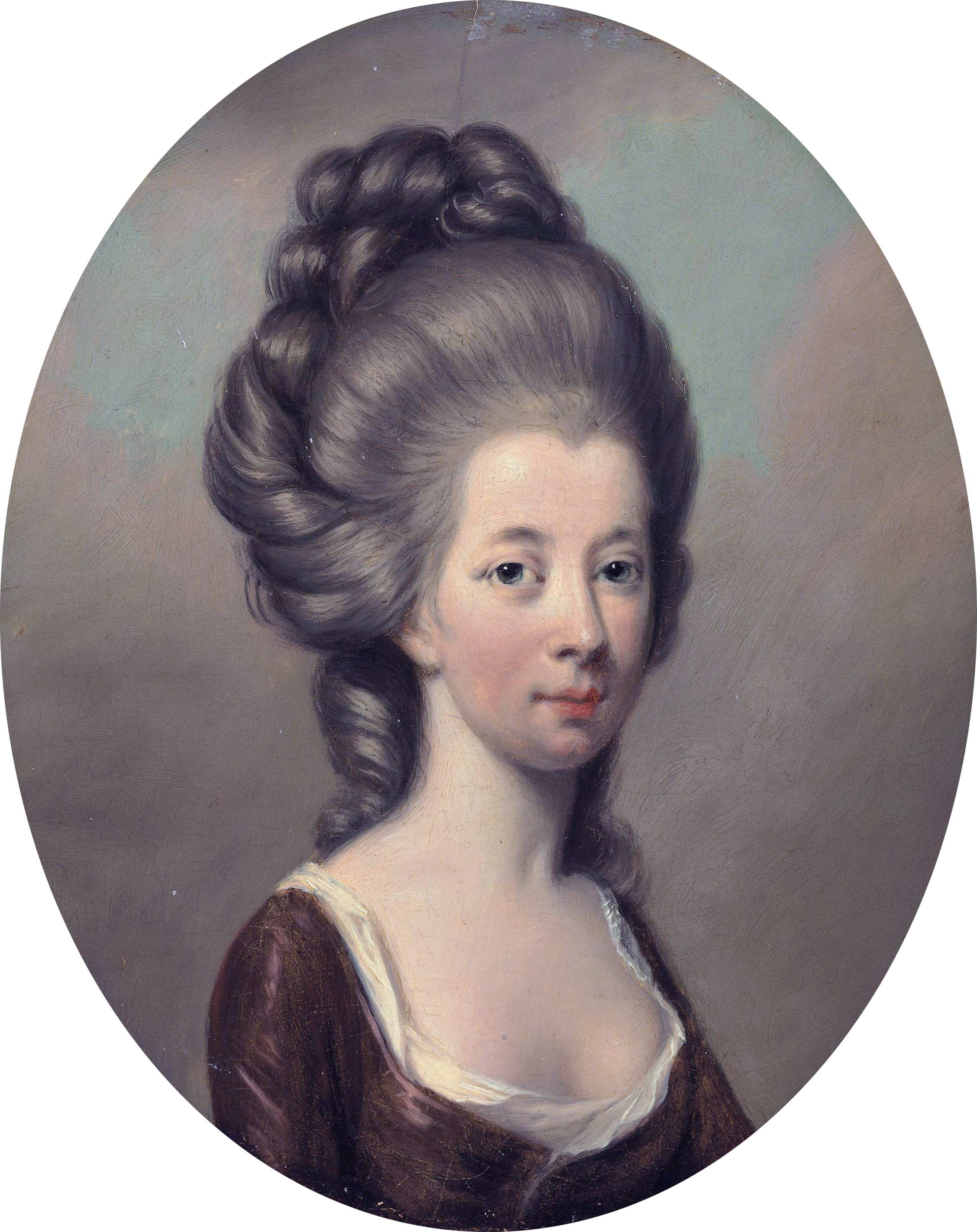
Emilia Olivia St George (Hugh Douglas Hamilton)

He died in Naples without a male heir, so his title became extinct. His daughter Emilia later married William FitzGerald, 2nd Duke of Leinster. His widow Lady St George died in 1813.
