= Robert Clements, 1st Earl of Leitrim =

Irish politician (1732–1804)

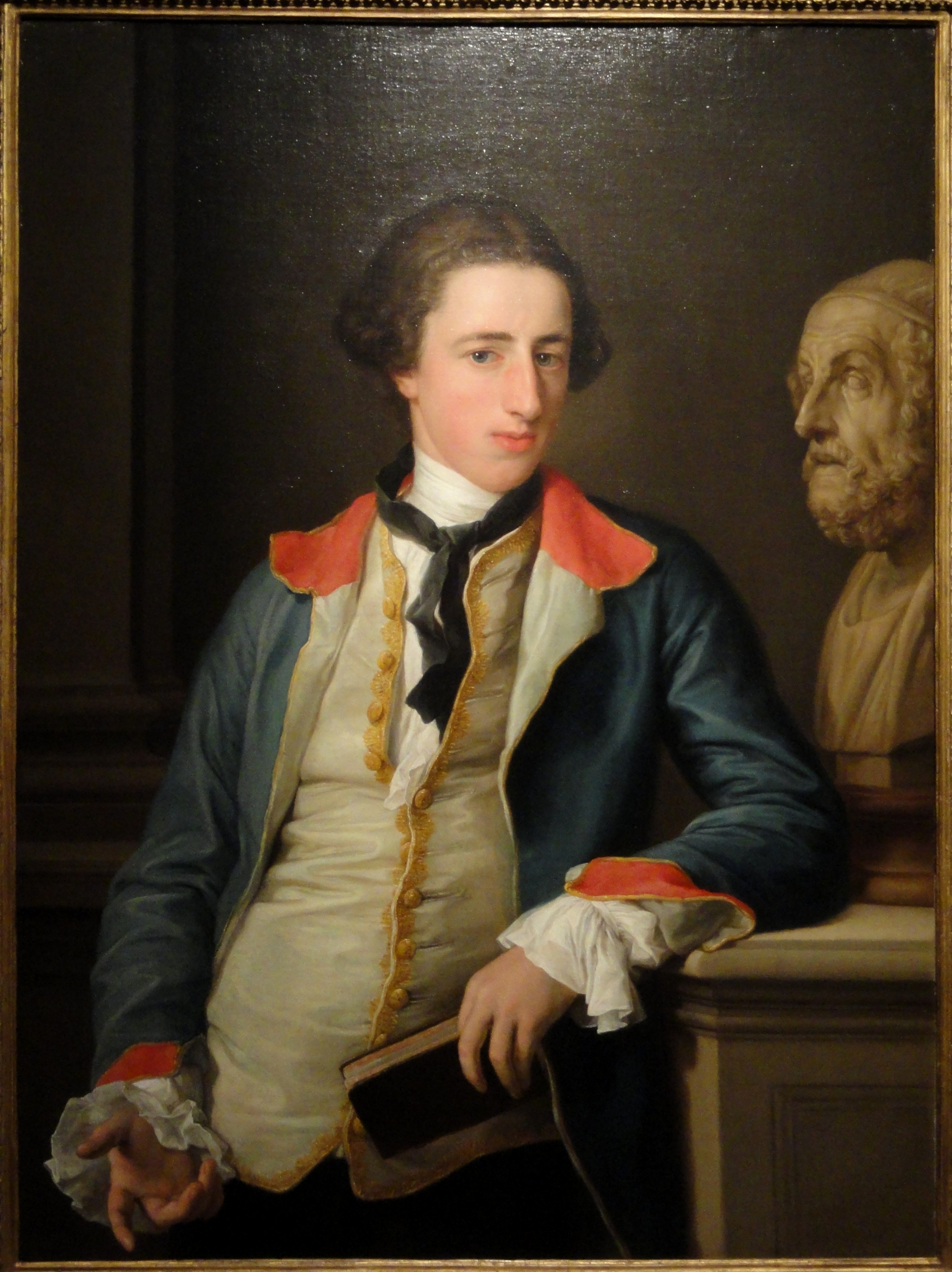
Robert Clements, later First Earl of Leitrim, by Pompeo Batoni, about 1753–1754

Robert Clements, 1st Earl of Leitrim (25 November 1732 – 27 July 1804) was an Irish nobleman and politician.

Son of Cavan Borough MP Nathaniel Clements, Deputy Vice Treasurer and Teller of the Irish Exchequer, Clements served as High Sheriff of Leitrim in 1759, having been the previous year appointed as Controller of the Great and Small Customs for the Port of Dublin.

In 1765, he was elected to the Irish House of Commons for County Donegal, exchanging this seat for that of Carrick in 1768. In the former year he also married Lady Elizabeth Skeffington, eldest daughter of Clotworthy Skeffington, 1st Earl of Massereene. He was subsequently Commissioner of the Revenue between 1772 and 1773, and three years later returned MP for County Donegal again.

Having been appointed governor of Counties Leitrim and Donegal in 1777 and 1781 respectively, Clements was ennobled as Baron Leitrim, of Manor Hamilton, in 1783. He was subsequently created Viscount Leitrim in 1794, and Earl of Leitrim in 1795. In 1801, he was elected as one of the original Irish representative peers, and was admitted to the Privy Council of Ireland the following year.

Lord Leitrim died aged 71 in London, and was buried in Dublin.

Parliament of Ireland
Preceded by Sir Ralph Gore, 6th Bt; Andrew Knox	Member of Parliament for County Donegal; 1765–1768; With: Andrew Knox	Succeeded by John McCausland; Alexander Montgomery
Preceded by Robert French; Dudley Cosby	Member of Parliament for Carrick; 1768–1777; With: Henry Sandford 1768–1776; Nathaniel Clements 1767–1777; Edward Sneyd 1777	Succeeded by Edward Sneyd; Robert Tighe
Preceded by John McCausland; Alexander Montgomery	Member of Parliament for County Donegal; 1776–1783; With: Alexander Montgomery	Succeeded by Henry Vaughan Brooke; Alexander Montgomery
Parliament of the United Kingdom
New title	Representative peer for Ireland; 1800–1804	Succeeded by The Earl of Enniskillen
Peerage of Ireland
New creation	Earl of Leitrim; 1795–1804	Succeeded by Nathaniel Clements
New creation	Viscount Leitrim; 1793–1804	Succeeded by Nathaniel Clements
New creation	Baron Leitrim; 1783–1804	Succeeded by Nathaniel Clements
