= Theophilus Jones (1729–1811) =

Irish politician

Member of the Irish Parliament for County Leitrim
- In office: 1761–1768; 1776–1783; 1790–1800

Member of the Irish Parliament for Coleraine
- In office 1769–1776

Member of the Irish Parliament for Monaghan
- In office 1783–1790

Member of the British Parliament for County Leitrim
- In office 1801–1802

Personal details
- Died: 8 December 1811
- Spouses: Catherine Beresford; Anne Murray
- Children: 6, including Walter and Theophilus Jones
- Parent(s): Walter Jones and Olivia Coote

Theophilus Jones (1729? – 8 December 1811) was an Irish MP and administrator.

He was born the eldest son of Walter Jones of Headfort and Olivia, the daughter and coheiress of the Hon. Chidley Coote of Coote Hall, County Roscommon.

He served three periods as MP for County Leitrim in the Parliament of Ireland, sitting from 1761 to 1768, 1776 to 1783 and 1790 to 1800. He also sat for Coleraine (1769 to 1776) and Monaghan Borough (1783 to 1790).

He was appointed secretary to Augustus Hervey, 3rd Earl of Bristol when the latter was Chief Secretary of Ireland in 1766, holding the post until 1799. He was appointed a Privy Counsellor in 1767 and Collector of Excise at the Port of Dublin from 1767 to 1799. After the Union with Great Britain in 1800, he was MP for County Leitrim in the Parliament of the United Kingdom from 1801 to 1802.

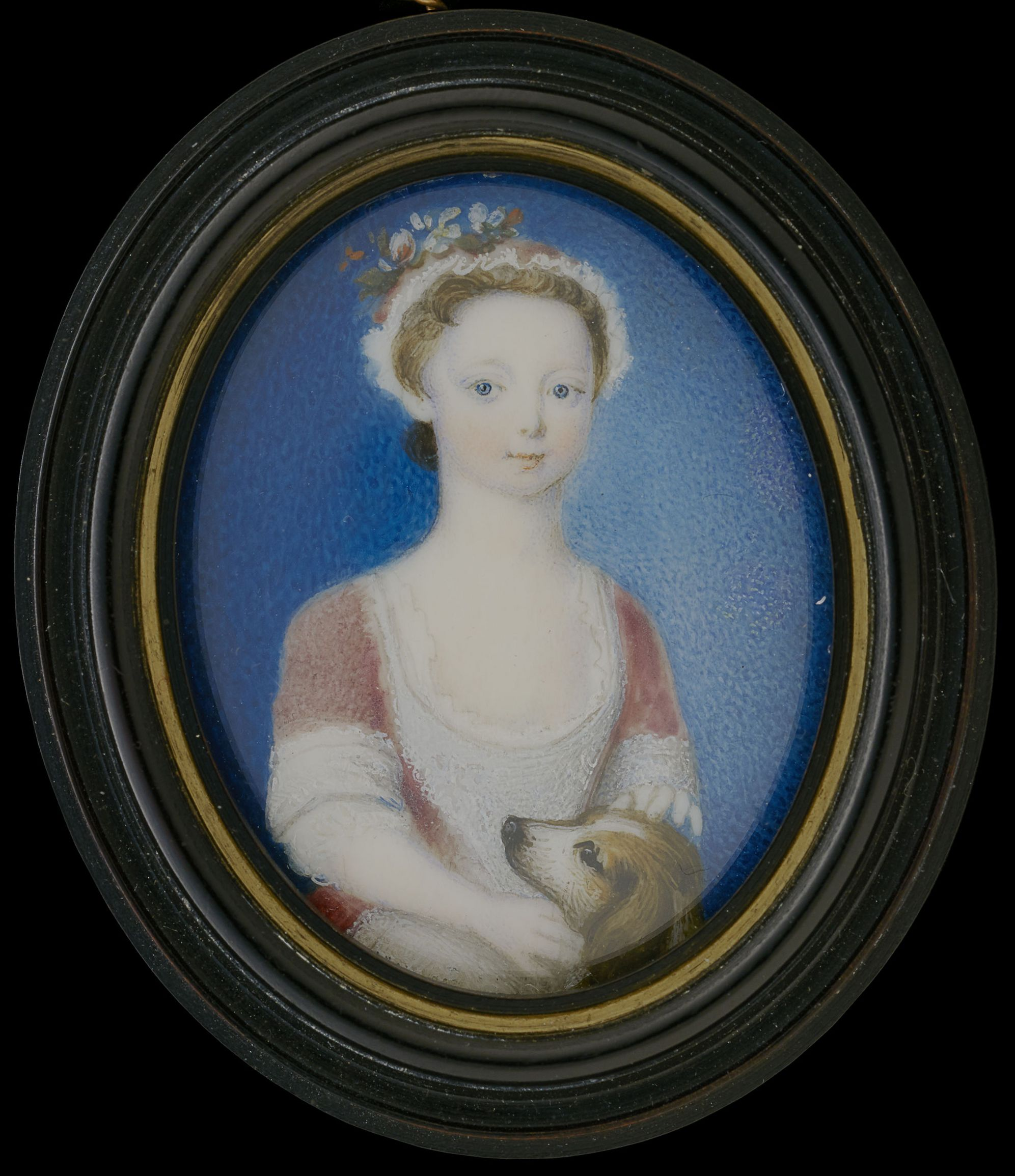
Catherine Beresford

Jones married three times, firstly in 1754 to the Hon. Catherine Beresford, daughter of 1st Earl of Tyrone, and widow of Thomas Christmas MP of Whitefield, County Waterford. They had 3 sons:

- Walter Jones (1754–1839), governor of County Leitrim, and an MP for Coleraine
- Theophilus Jones, a Royal Navy admiral
- Reverend James Jones (died 1825), a Church of Ireland rector in County Down

After Catherine 's death in 1763, he remarried in 1768 to Anne Murray, daughter of Colonel John Murray MP from Monaghan, with whom he had one son and two daughters:

- Henry, who died young
- Maria, died unmarried
- Anne, died in infancy

He served as collector of customs at Dublin Port for a period ending in 1799, however, for much of this period he farmed out the position.

Parliament of Ireland
Preceded by Hugh Crofton; William Gore	Member of Parliament for County Leitrim; 1761–1768; With: John Wynne	Succeeded by William Gore; Nathaniel Clements
Preceded by Richard Jackson; John Beresford	Member of Parliament for Coleraine; 1768–1776; With: Richard Jackson	Succeeded by Hon. Richard Annesley; Richard Jackson
Preceded by Nathaniel Clements; William Gore II	Member of Parliament for County Leitrim; 1776–1783; With: Henry Theophilus Clements	Succeeded by Henry Theophilus Clements; Peter La Touche
Preceded by Robert Cuninghame; Thomas James Fortescue	Member of Parliament for Monaghan Borough; 1783–1790; With: Robert Cuninghame	Succeeded by Cromwell Price; Robert Cuninghame
Preceded by John Gore; Peter La Touche	Member of Parliament for County Leitrim; 1790–1800; With: Henry Theophilus Clements 1790–96; Peter La Touche 1796–98; Viscount Clements 1798–1800	Act of Union
Parliament of the United Kingdom
New constituency Act of Union	Member of Parliament for County Leitrim; 1801–1802; With: Viscount Clements	Succeeded by Viscount Clements; Peter La Touche II
Political offices
Preceded by Hon. Augustus Hervey	Chief Secretary for Ireland; 1767	Succeeded by Lord Frederick Campbell
