= Carrick (Parliament of Ireland constituency) =

Pre-1801 Irish constituency

- Former borough constituency for the Irish House of Commons
- County: County Leitrim
- Borough: Carrick-on-Shannon

1614–1801
- Seats: 2
- Replaced by: Disfranchised

Carrick (also known as Carrigdrumruske or Carrick-on-Shannon Borough) was a constituency represented in the Irish House of Commons from 1614 to 1800. It returned two members.

== Borough ==
This constituency was the borough of Carrick-on-Shannon in County Leitrim.

== History ==
In the Patriot Parliament of 1689 summoned by James II, Carrick was not represented. Under the terms of the Acts of Union 1800, the constituency was disenfranchised and abolished.

== Members of Parliament, 1614–1801 ==
- 1613–1615 Maurice Griffith and Thomas Bellot
- 1639–1649 Sir George St George and John Jackson
- 1661–1666 Richard Barrett and Thomas Carr

=== 1689–1801 ===
Election	First MP	Second MP
1689	Carrick was not represented in the Patriot Parliament	
1692	Roger Smith	Owen Wynne
August 1695	Richard St George (Note: Also elected for Galway Town in 1695, for which he chose to sit)	John French
1695	Arthur Cooper	John French
1703	Sir George St George	Oliver St George
1713	Sir George St George	John French
1714	Edward Ormsby	John French
1715	John Ussher	Richard St George
1741	St George St George	Richard St George
1755	St George St George	John Pomeroy
1761	St George St George	Robert French
1763	Dudley Alexander Sydney Cosby	Robert French
1768	Henry Sandford	Robert Clements (Note: Also elected for County Donegal in 1776, for which he chose to sit.)
1776	Nathaniel Clements	Robert Clements
1777	Edward Sneyd	Robert Clements
1777	Edward Sneyd	Robert Tighe
1781	Edward King	Robert Tighe
October 1783	Hon. Thomas Pelham	George Sandford (Note: Also elected for Roscommon in 1783, for which he chose to sit.)
1783	Hon. Thomas Pelham	Edward King
1790	Hon. Nathaniel Clements (Note: Styled as Viscount Clements from 1795) (Note: Also elected for County Leitrim in 1798, for which he chose to sit.)	Edward King
1794	Hon. Nathaniel Clements	Nathaniel Sneyd
1798	William Gore	Nathaniel Sneyd
1800	William Gore	Robert Tighe
1801	Disenfranchised	

== Bibliography ==
- O'Hart, John (2007). The Irish and Anglo-Irish Landed Gentry: When Cromwell came to Ireland. Vol. II. Heritage Books. ISBN 0-7884-1927-7.
- Leigh Rayment's historical List of Members of the Irish House of Commons. Cites: Johnston-Liik, Edith Mary (2002). The History of the Irish Parliament 1692-1800 (6 volumes). Ulster Historical Foundation.
