= Henry Clements (1704–1745) =

Irish politician

Henry Clements was an Irish politician.

Clements was born in County Cavan and educated at Trinity College Dublin. He represented County Cavan from 1729 to 1745.
