= Lisbellaw =

Coordinates: 54.317°N 7.537°W

Lisbellaw: Lios Béal Átha
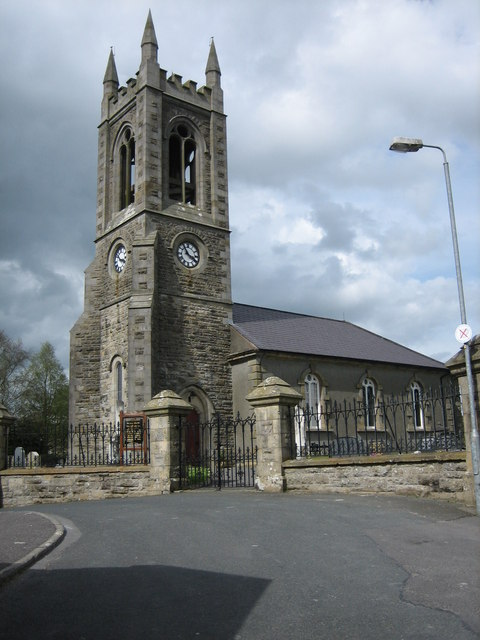
- Lisbellaw Parish Church

- Location within Northern Ireland
- Population: 1,106 (2011 census)
  - Belfast: 78 miles
- District: Fermanagh and Omagh
- County: County Fermanagh
- Country: Northern Ireland
- Sovereign state: United Kingdom
- Post town: ENNISKILLEN
- Postcode district: BT94
- Dialling code: 028, +44 28
- UK Parliament: Fermanagh and South Tyrone
- NI Assembly: Fermanagh and South Tyrone

Lisbellaw (from Irish Lios Béal Átha, meaning 'ringfort at the ford-mouth') is a village in County Fermanagh, Northern Ireland, about 5 miles (8.0 km) east of Enniskillen. In 2008 it had an estimated population of 1,277 people.

The village is built around the Church of Ireland parish church, which was built in the 18th century. The steep main street houses two grocery shop, a hairdressing salon, two pubs, a post office, a dentist's surgery, a beauty salon, a butcher, two mechanics, a pharmacy, a health store distributor, a chip shop, and a hardware store, as well as the Church of Ireland parish centre, the Methodist and Presbyterian churches. The Catholic church and a Plymouth Brethren gospel hall lie just off the main street. Just outside the village is Carrybridge, a marina on Upper Lough Erne.

Lisbellaw railway station opened on 16 August 1858 and shut down on 1 October 1957.

== Population ==
=== 2001 census ===
Lisbellaw is classified as a village by the Northern Ireland Statistics and Research Agency. A census performed on 29 April 2001 revealed a population of 1,046 people living in Lisbellaw. Of these:

- 24.0% were aged under 16 years and 16.7% were aged 60 and over
- 48.7% of the population were male and 51.3% were female
- 91.9% were from a Protestant and other Christian background (including Christian related community background)
- 7.3% of the population were from a Catholic Community Background
- 5.7% of people aged 16–74 were unemployed

=== 2011 census ===
On census day (27 March 2011) the usually resident population of Lisbellaw Settlement was 1,106 accounting for 0.06% of the NI total.

- 99.64% were from the white (including Irish Traveller) ethnic group;
- 13.47% belong to or were brought up in the Catholic religion and 83.00% belong to or were brought up in a 'Protestant and Other Christian (including Christian related)' religion; and
- 72.42% indicated that they had a British national identity, 10.85% had an Irish national identity and 26.13% had a Northern Irish national identity. Respondents could indicate more than one national identity.
- 3.90% had some knowledge of Irish;
- 7.03% had some knowledge of Ulster-Scots; and
- 0.38% did not have English as their first language.

== See also ==
- Market houses in Northern Ireland
