= County Leitrim (Parliament of Ireland constituency) =

Pre-1801 Irish constituency

- Former county constituency for the Irish House of Commons
- County: County Leitrim

–1801
- Seats: 2
- Replaced by: County Leitrim (UKHC)

County Leitrim was a constituency represented in the Irish House of Commons until its abolition on 1 January 1801

== County constituency ==
County Leitrim was represented by two MPs in the Irish House of Commons. It continued to be represented by two MPs in the United Kingdom House of Commons after 1801.

== Members of Parliament ==
- 1613–1615 William Reynolds and Gerald Nugent
- 1634–1635 Charles Reynolds and __ Crofton
- 1639–1649 Humphrey Reynolds and Sir Charles Coote
- 1661–1666 Sir Oliver St George, 1st Baronet (sat for Galway and replaced by Sir George St George) and Robert Parke

=== 1689–1801 ===
| Election | First MP | Second MP |
|---|---|---|
| 1689 | Edmond Reynolds | Iriel Farrell |
| 1692 | John Reynolds | James Wynne |
| 1695 | John Reynolds | Theophilus Jones I |
| 1703 | William Gore I | Theophilus Jones I |
| 1730 | William Gore II | Theophilus Jones I |
| 1743 | William Gore II | Hugh Crofton |
| 1761 | Theophilus Jones II | John Wynne |
| 1768 | Nathaniel Clements | William Gore II |
| 1769 | Nathaniel Clements | William Gore III |
| 1776 | Henry Theophilus Clements | Theophilus Jones II |
| 1783 | Henry Theophilus Clements | Peter La Touche |
| 1784 | John Gore | Peter La Touche |
| 1790 | Henry Theophilus Clements | Theophilus Jones II |
| 1796 | Peter La Touche | Theophilus Jones II |
| 1798 | Nathaniel Clements, Viscount Clements | Theophilus Jones II |
| 1801 | Succeeded by Westminster constituency of County Leitrim | |

== See also ==
- List of Irish constituencies
