= Clements (surname) =

Clements is an English surname. Notable people with the surname include:

- A. J. Clements (Andrew Jackson; 1832–1913), American politician
- Alexander J. Clements (c. 1866–1933), American politician accused of graft
- Allen Clements (born 1978), American filmmaker
- Andrew Clements (disambiguation)
- Ashley Clements, American actress
- Bailey Clements (born 2000), English footballer
- Bill Clements (1917–2011), Governor of Texas
- Billy Clements (fl. 1920s), English rugby league footballer
- Brett Clements (born 1973), Australian rugby league footballer
- Charles Clements (disambiguation)
- Charlie Clements (born 1987), British actor
- Charlotte Clements (born 1979), British ice dancer
- Chris Clements (disambiguation)
- Christopher Clements (born 1954), English cricketer
- Chuck Clements (born 1973), American football player
- Courtney Clements (born 1989), American basketball player
- Dave Clements (born 1945), North Irish football player
- David Clements (disambiguation)
- Dawn Clements (1958–2018), American artist
- Douglas Clements, American educator
- Earle Clements (1896–1985), Governor of Kentucky
- Edith Clements (1874–1971), American botanist
- Ernie Clements (1922–2006), English road racing cyclist
- Frederic Clements (1874–1945), American plant ecologist
- George Clements (disambiguation)
- Gilbert Clements (1928–2012), Lieutennant Governor of Prince Edward Island
- Harry Clements (footballer) (1883–1939), English footballer
- Harry R. Clements (1929–2023), American engineer and businessman
- James Clements (disambiguation)
- Jeff Clements (born 1962), American attorney
- Jeremy Clements, American stock car racing driver
- Jesse Clements (1927–1991), American football and basketball coach
- Jimmy Clements (c. 1847–1927), Australian Aboriginal elder
- Joe Clements (disambiguation)
- Joseph Clements (actor), Australian actor
- John Clements (disambiguation)
- Jonathan Clements (born 1971), British author and scriptwriter
- Jonathan Clements (columnist) (1963–2025), British financial journalist
- Judith Clements, Australian medical researcher
- Kendall Clements, New Zealand biologist and ecologist
- Kennedi Clements (born 2007), Canadian child actress
- Kenneth Clements (1905–1992), Australian Anglican bishop
- Kenny Clements (born 1955), English footballer
- Kirstie Clements (born 1962), Australian author
- Leo Clements (1907–1979), Australian rules footballer
- Mark Alwin Clements (born 1949), Australian botanist and orchidologist
- Marie Clements (born 1962), Canadian Métis dramatist
- Nate Clements (born 1979), American NFL cornerback
- Nathaniel Clements (1705–1777), Irish politician and financial figure
- Nathaniel Clements, 2nd Earl of Leitrim (1768–1854), Irish nobleman and politician
- Nick Clements (1940–2009), American linguist and phonologist
- Pat Clements (born 1962), American baseball player
- Phil Clements (born 1952), Australian rugby union player
- R. E. Clements (Ronald Ernest; 1929–2024), British theologian
- Richard Clements (journalist) (1928–2006), English journalist
- Richard Clements (painter) (1951–1999), Australian painter
- Rita Crocker Clements (1931–2018), First Lady of Texas
- Robert Clements (disambiguation)
- Rod Clements (born 1947), British guitarist
- Ron Clements (born 1953), American animation director
- Rory Clements, British author
- Roy Clements (born 1946), British author and former clergyman
- Reuben Clements (1783–1868), Nova Scotian politician
- Rhiannon Clements (born 1994), English actress
- Sasha Clements (born 1990), Canadian actress and model
- Sean Clements (born 1981) is an American writer and comedian
- Shane Clements (1958–2001), Australian cricketer
- Stan Clements (1923–2018), English footballer
- Stanley Clements (1926–1981), American actor and comedian
- Stiles Clements (1883–1966), American architect
- Sylvester G. Clements (born 1936), American politician
- TC Clements (born 1969), American politician
- Theophilus Clements (fl. 1729–1745), Irish politician
- Tom Clements (disambiguation)
- Tony Clements (born 1954), American musician
- Vassar Clements (1928–2005), American fiddle player
- William Clements (disambiguation)
- Zeke Clements (1911–1994), American musician
- Clements twins (Ava Marie and Leah Rose; born 2010), American models and social media influencers
