= Victim of Modern Age =

American musical group

- Origin: Lake Charles, Louisiana
- Genres: alternative music
- Years active: 2001–2004
- Labels: Universal Warning Records
- Past members: Bobby Nixon; Jacob Vantiger; Allen Clements; Jason Decou; David Leonard
- Website: www.VictimofModernage.com

Victim of Modern Age was a musical group originating circa 2002 in Lake Charles, Louisiana. They disbanded in December 2004.

== History ==
Self-titled EP (2001)

After recording their first EP Self-titled, the band was scooped up by Philadelphia Indie Label Universal Warning Records in 2001. The contract put them in touch with nationally spread label mates which opened up to several national tours. Similarly, this opportunity gave a seemingly wide distribution for their follow album through Revelation Records and the now merged Lumberjack Distribution. Around this time the group was joined by Allen Clements of Lafayette, LA-based band Claymore. Allen was to begin writing with the band immediately and help with booking tours.

Channels Like Capillaries (2003)

A 2003 web bio mentioned that their music was of "independent expression and also draws from other musical stylings, including some massive jazz roots." Channels Like Capillaries was the band's second release on Universal Warning Records. During their 2003 recording sessions, the band worked closely with long-time friend and Grammy Award Winning engineer, Ivan Klisanin. The album includes piano interlude and layered vocals.

Throughout the years, the rhythm section was changed many times due originally to the vocationally related departure of bassist Nathan Carnes and soon following, Drummer Dan Robertson.

After many member changes followed by a several month hiatus, Singer/Guitarist Allen Clements decided to accept an offer of touring guitarist position for ex label-mates Sadaharu residing in Lancaster, Pennsylvania.

During their two-year lifetime, Victim of Modern Age had performed with GoGoGo Airheart, Benton Falls, Hey Mercedes, Liars Academy, Avec, We are Childhood Equals, Mae, Bright and Hollow Sky, Red Animal War, Jet By Day, Snakes and Music, Twothirtyeight, The Movie Life, Brand New, The North Atlantic, Brandston and many others. The band featured members from Ponder, Claymore, & One Common Voice.

=== After VOMA ===
Bobby Nixon aka Bobby Missile moved to Hot Springs, Arkansas with a bandmate from his side-project Ballistic Missile. There, he and Zak Mouton turned an old restaurant called The Exchange into a local music venue. Bobby and Zak started the band Attractive and Popular. The band toured quite frequently and ran all ages shows out of The Exchange when home. The band eventually hooked up with GSL (Gold Standard Labs) label and in 2007 released their first national record entitled Money Equals Magic. Bobby took part in helping to establish a music festival in Hot Springs which is known as the Valley of the Vapors Independent Music Festival. After touring as a stage manager/tech for the UK based band alt-J from 2012 to 2014 he became a founding member of the currently active band GHOST BONES with Ashley Hill, Ryan Jolly, and Adam Walton.

After the loss of their third drummer, Allen Clements decided to move to Lancaster, Pennsylvania and take a position as touring guitarist in CI Records band "Sadaharu." After a few short tours, Allen called it quits, opened a video production company and still plays occasionally under the moniker, "A. Premise." and can also be found randomly at the occasional open-mic night.

== History ==
- February 2002 - First Performance
- July 22, 2002 - First tour (Central US)
- August 2002 - Joined by Allen Clements (Claymore) on Guitar.
- December 2002 - Second Tour (East Coast)
- October 2003 - David Leonard joins as drummer.
- December 11, 2003 - Released first full-length/second UDUB record, "Channels Like Capillaries"
- May 2004 - Shawn Gachassin joins as drummer.
- July 15, 2004 - Leave for Third Tour (West Coast/central US)
- December 28, 2004 - Last show. Performed at Renaissance Cafe & Nightclub in Lafayette, LA

== Members ==
- Bobby Nixon: Guitar, Vocals
- Allen Clements: Guitar, Vocals
- Jacob Vantiger: Guitar (2000-2002)
- Nathan Carnes: Bass (2000-2003)
- Jason Decou: Bass (2003-2004)
- Dan Robertson: Drums (2000-2003)
- David Leonard: Drums (2003)
- Shawn Gachassin: Drums (2004)

== Discography ==
- S/T EP (July 4, 2002)
- Channels Like Capillaries (December 11, 2003)

Compilations

- As it Plays (Thinker Thought Records) - VOMA Track : "Silt City
- Singularity, The Awareness Program - VOMA Track : "Last Night"
