= Universal Records (disambiguation) =

Universal Music Group is the largest music corporation in the world.

Universal Records may also refer to:

- Universal Records (1995), a record label owned by Universal Music Group
- List of Universal Music Group labels
- Show Dog-Universal Music, an American independent record label
- Universal Records (Philippines), a Filipino record label
- Universal Classics Records
- Universal Motown Records
- Universal Warning Records, a record label and video production company in Philadelphia
- Universal Records (1988), a country music label owned by Jimmy Bowen and merged into Capitol Records

== See also ==
- Universal Recording Corporation, a recording studio in Chicago founded by Bill Putnam, Sr.
- United Western Recorders, a recording studio in Hollywood in the 1960s
