= Hudson County Courthouse =

Beaux-Arts courthouse in Jersey City, USA

- U.S. National Register of Historic Places
- New Jersey Register of Historic Places
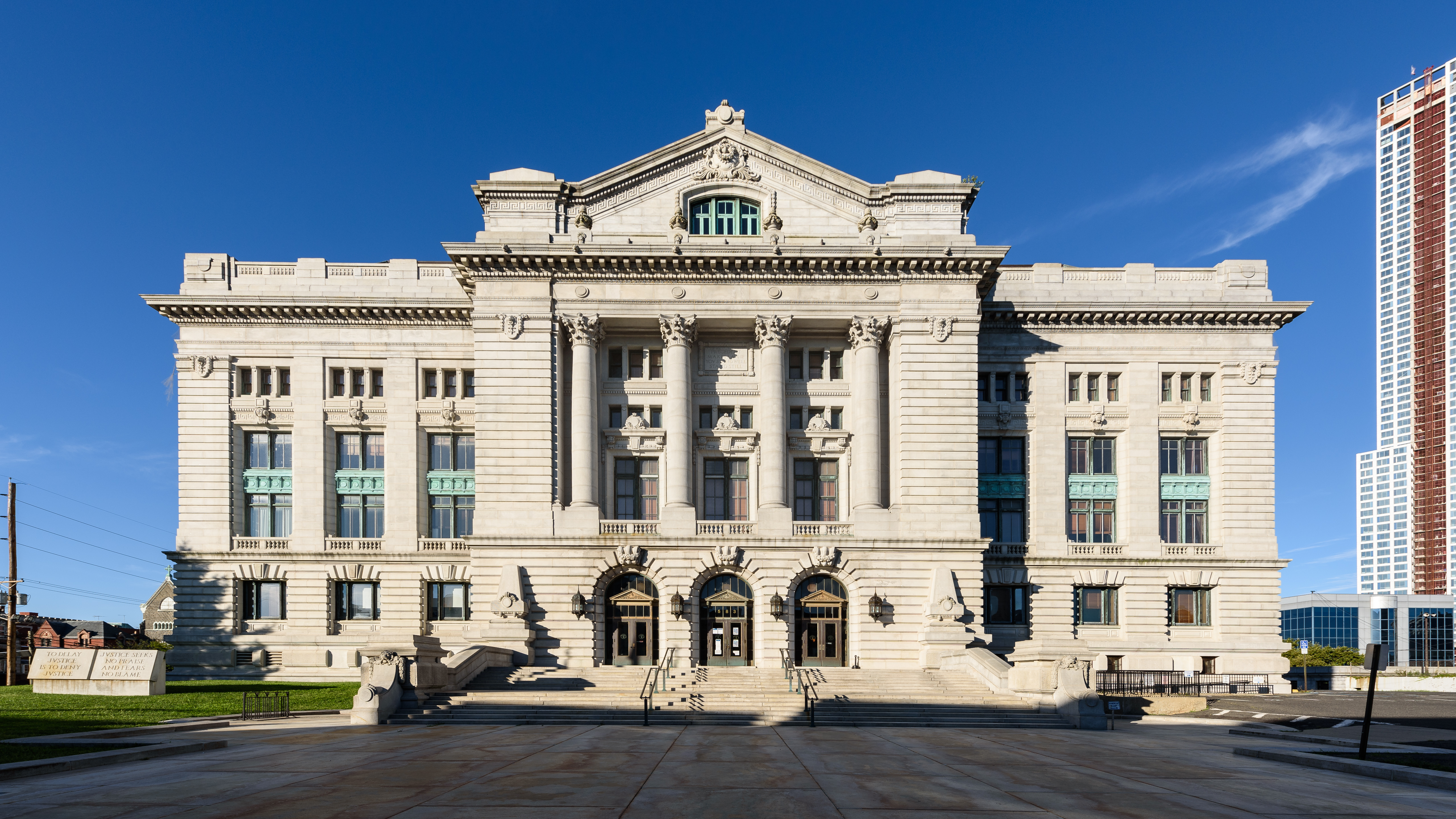

- Location within Hudson County, New Jersey Location within New Jersey Location within the United States
- Location: 583 Newark Avenue, Jersey City, Hudson County, New Jersey USA
- Coordinates: 40°43′54.2″N 74°3′26.1″W
- Area: 2 acres (0.81 ha)
- Built: 1910
- Architect: Hugh Roberts
- Architectural style: Beaux-Arts
- NRHP reference No.: 70000385
- NJRHP No.: 1510

Significant dates
- Added to NRHP: August 25, 1970
- Designated NJRHP: June 12, 1970

The Hudson County Courthouse or Justice William J. Brennan Jr. Courthouse is located in Jersey City, Hudson County, New Jersey, United States. The six-story structure was originally built between 1906 and 1910 at a cost of $3,328,016.56. It is considered to be an outstanding example of the Beaux-Arts architectural style in the United States.

The courthouse was used as the primary seat of government for Hudson County from its opening on September 20, 1910 until the construction of the Hudson County Administration Building in 1966. The courthouse was vacant for many years and was scheduled for demolition. The building was added to the National Register of Historic Places on August 25, 1970. Restoration began in the mid-1970s, and the building was reopened in 1985. In 1984, the Hudson County Board of Chosen Freeholders renamed the building in honor of Supreme Court Justice William J. Brennan Jr. The restoration of the courthouse was acknowledged by a Victorian Society in America Preservation Award in 1988.

As of 2019 the courthouse has eight working courtrooms and also houses the offices of the County Executive, the Hudson County Surrogate and the Hudson County Bar Association; in the past it has been used in a number of television programs and movies, including scenes in the television series Law & Order and the movie Joker, as well as in commercials.

== Construction ==
The Courthouse was designed by Jersey City native Hugh Roberts, twice a president of the New Jersey Chapter of the American Institute of Architects. Roberts, brother-in-law of future United States Senator and New Jersey Governor Edward I. Edwards, received a direct appointment as architect. No competition or bidding for designs was held, causing controversy among local architects. The property on which the courthouse stands was obtained from fourteen separate property owners between 1905 and 1914. The chairman of the Court House Commission, Alexander J. Clements and several other local politicians were later indicted for graft. The groundbreaking took place on March 21, 1906 and the cornerstone was laid on December 12, 1906. Construction of the building was done by Wells Brothers of New York City and construction of the interiors and finishes were by John Gill & Son of Cleveland, Ohio.

The courthouse is constructed of granite quarried in Hallowell, Maine. The front of the building is visually dominated by four Corinthian columns and a frieze above the main entrance bearing the inscription "Precedent Makes Law; If You Stand Well, Stand Still."

== Interiors ==
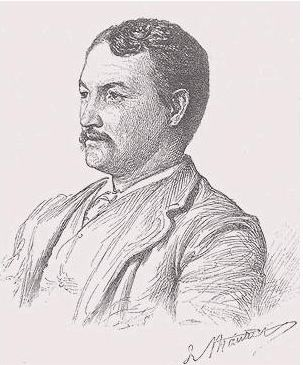
Francis Millet, portrait by George du Maurier, 1889

Roberts delegated the assignment of artwork to the muralist Francis David Millet, noted for his work as decorations director for the 1893 World's Columbian Exposition in Chicago; Millet assigned himself two lunettes on the third floor and a dozen small panels in the second floor corridors. Also on the third floor, Millet assigned two lunettes to Charles Yardley Turner, as well as eight more to Kenyon Cox. Cox also provided the groined ceilings. Edwin Blashfield painted the glass dome and the four pendentives between its supporting arches. The Tudor-style legislative chamber of the Board of Freeholders on the second floor was adorned with murals by Howard Pyle depicting early life of the Dutch and English in New Jersey. This room has been called "one of the handsomest legislative chambers in the United States."

David G. Lowe, writing in American Heritage magazine, described the interior of the building:

The courthouse interior is a rush of color—pearl gray and green-veined marbles, golden light fixtures, yellow, green, and blue paint. Standing in the great central court, one looks up the three stories of the magnificent rotunda to a dome whose outer rim is painted with the signs of the zodiac and whose center is an eye of stained glass worthy of Tiffany. One feels—as one does in the rotunda at the heart of the Capitol in Washington—the dignity of government and the permanence of law.

== Restoration ==
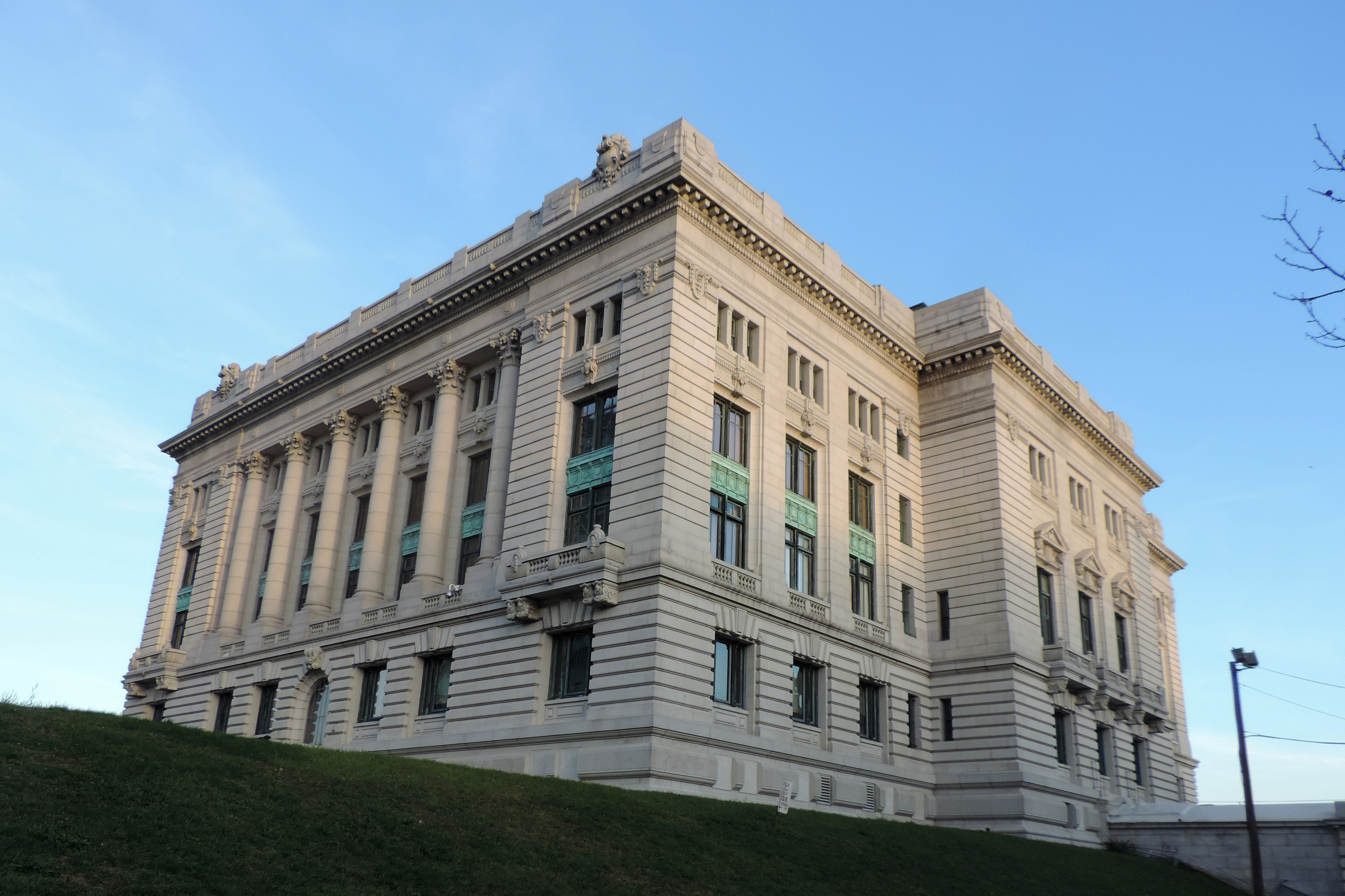
Southwest and northwest faces

Plans for restoring the courthouse had been proposed even before it fell into disuse. In 1961, the architectural modelist Theodore Conrad proposed converting the building into a new city hall for Jersey City. The plan would have created a mall in front of the building and surrounded it with additional city buildings and a museum. Another proposal would house a branch of the New Jersey State Museum in the building. Conrad led a citizens group that lobbied for the preservation of the building, and got it listed on the National Register of Historic Places. The award-winning restoration project resulted in the courthouse being reopened in 1985 for the use of the civil courts and other county offices.

== Renaming ==
The Hudson County Board of Chosen Freeholders renamed the courthouse in 1984 in honor of Associate Supreme Court Justice William J. Brennan, who had served in the building as Hudson County Assignment Judge from 1947 through 1951. Following the 1989 Supreme Court decision in Texas v. Johnson, which Brennan authored, veterans groups petitioned unsuccessfully to have the name removed, but the Freeholders unanimously voted to retain the name.

== See also ==
- County courthouses in New Jersey
- Federal courthouses in New Jersey
- Richard J. Hughes Justice Complex
- National Register of Historic Places listings in Hudson County, New Jersey
