= Charles Clemens =

Charles Clemens may refer to:

- Cal Clemens (Charles Calvin Clemens Jr., 1911–1965), American football player
- Herbert Clemens (Charles Herbert Clemens Jr., born 1939), American mathematician
- Charles P. Clemens (1842–1895), American politician

== See also ==
- Charles Clements (disambiguation)
- Chuck Clemons (born 1957), American politician
