= David Clemens (disambiguation) =

David Clemens (fl. from 2016) is an an American politician.

David Clemens may also refer to:

- Priya David Clemens (born 1974), American journalist
- David Clemens, fictional characer in a 1962 American drama film David and Lisa
- David Clemens, an early settler of Blossburg, Pennsylvania

== See also ==
- David Clements (disambiguation)
