= Hugh Roberts (architect) =

American architect

- Born: 1867
- Died: 1928 (aged 60–61)
- Education: Brooklyn Polytechnic Institute
- Occupation: Architect
- Children: 1 daughter, 3 sons
- Practice: American Institute of Architects

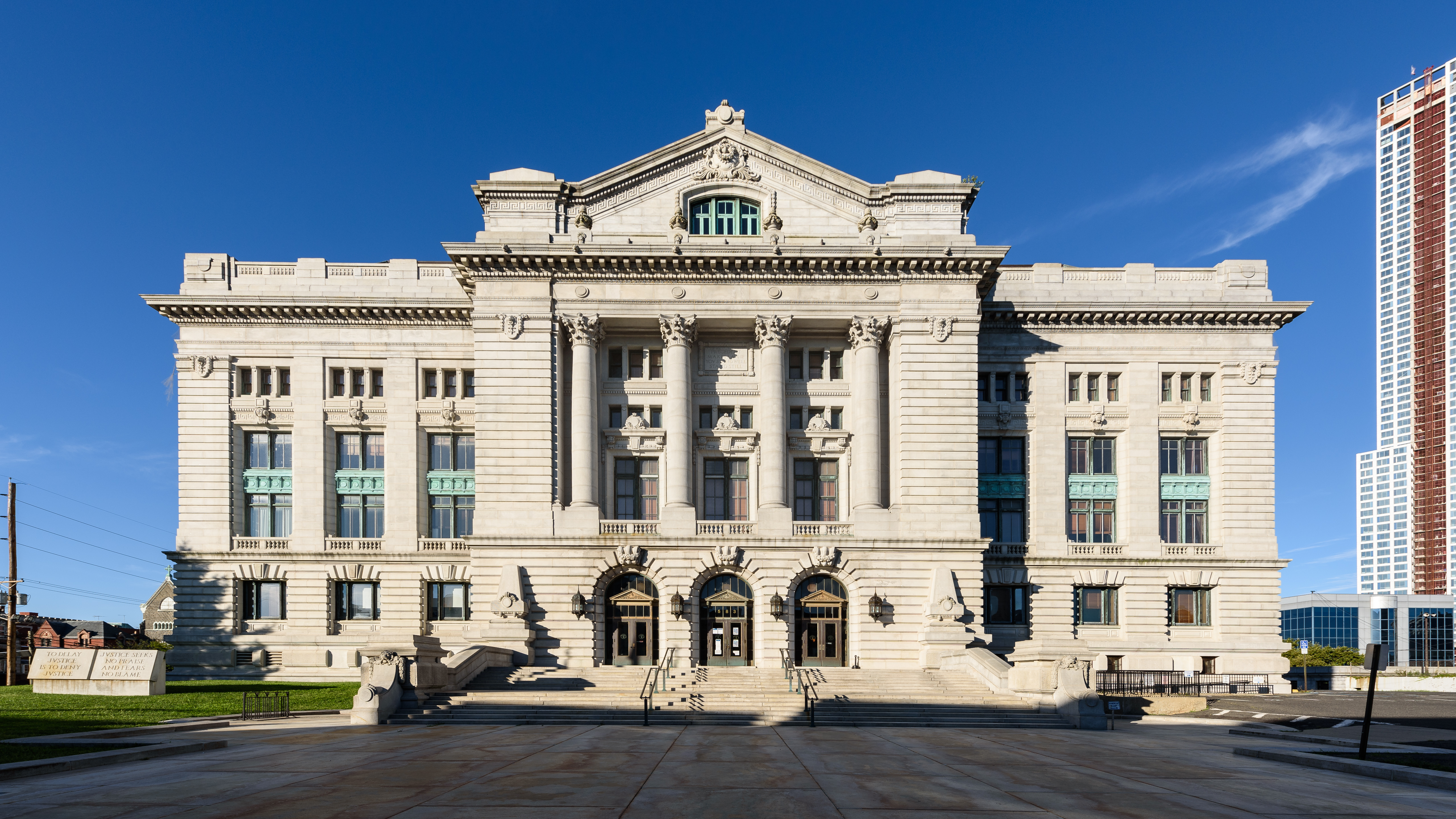
The Hudson County Courthouse in Jersey City, designed by Roberts and completed in 1910.

Hugh Roberts (1867–1928) was an architect in Jersey City, New Jersey. He designed the Hudson County Courthouse, built from 1906 to 1910. Roberts served two terms as president of the New Jersey Chapter of the American Institute of Architects.

He was born in Brooklyn, New York and studied at the Brooklyn Polytechnic Institute.

A corruption scandal followed completion of the courthouse in 1910 and damaged his career. He also designed several homes in what is now the West Bergen - East Lincoln Park Historic District

He married and had a daughter and three sons.

== See also ==
- John T. Rowland
