= John Clement =

John Clement may refer to:

- John Clement (Ontario politician) (1928–2014), politician in Ontario, Canada
- John Clement (physician) (c. 1500–1572), English Roman Catholic physician and humanist
- John Clement, baseball player in the 1956 Olympics
- John Clement Gordon (1644–1726), bishop of Galloway, Scotland
- Johnny Clement (1919–1969), American football player
- Jack Clement (1931–2013), American singer/songwriter and record/film producer
- John Clement, Count of Branicki (1689–1771), Polish nobleman, magnate and Hetman
- John Clement (MP), in 1539, MP for Bath

== See also ==
- John Clements (disambiguation)
