= George Clements (disambiguation) =

George Clements (1932–2019) was an American Roman Catholic priest and social activist.

George Clements may also refer to:

- George H. Clements (newspaper manager), newspaper manager in Texas
- George H. Clements (artist) (1854–1935), American artist
- Nick Clements (George Nick Clements, 1940–2009), American theoretical linguist
