= Theodore Conrad =

American architect

- Born: May 19, 1910; Jersey City, New Jersey, U.S.
- Died: August 19, 1994 (aged 84); Jersey City, New Jersey, U.S.
- Occupations: Architect, preservationist and model maker

Theodore Conrad (May 19, 1910 – August 19, 1994) was an American architect, preservationist and a leading architectural model maker, often referred to as the Dean of Models. Conrad was one of the first independent architectural model makers in the United States and contributed significantly to modern architecture through his collaborations with architects such as Harvey Wiley Corbett, Wallace Harrison, Skidmore, Owings & Merrill and Edward Durell Stone. His most notable projects include models for the Metropolitan Life North Building, Rockefeller Center, Lever House, Seagram Building, the Manufacturers Trust Company Building and the John F. Kennedy Eternal Flame.

== Career ==
Theodore Conrad was born in Jersey City, New Jersey, as the great-grandson of German immigrants. Trained as an architect at the Pratt Institute in Brooklyn, Conrad turned towards architectural model making in 1929 when he began an internship in Harvey Wiley Corbett's office in New York City. Conrad established his own modeling studio in Jersey City in 1931. Initially working in wood and cardboard, Conrad became one of the first model makers to use Plexiglas and aluminum extensively for architectural models during the so-called miniature boom in the 1950s. After World War II, Theodore Conrad became one of the premier model makers in the United States collaborating on some of America's most highly publicized projects such as John F. Kennedy's grave and the John F. Kennedy Center for the Performing Arts in Washington D.C. as well as International Style high-rises such as the Seagram Building and Lever House. In 1962, Conrad was the only model maker to ever receive the Craftsmanship Medal from the American Institute of Architects for his lifetime achievement with architectural models.

Aside from his work as a model maker, Theodore Conrad was a pioneering preservationist in North Jersey who was active in the Citizens Committee of Hudson County. He was an instrumental voice in the successful campaigns to rescue the Hudson County Courthouse and Loew's Theater in Jersey City as well as an advocate for the creation of Liberty State Park. In 1994, a street in Liberty State Park was named in his honor.

== Legacy ==
Theodore Conrad's work has received renewed interest in recent years. His models have since been included in a number of exhibitions, most recently at the German Architecture Museum in Frankfurt in the 2012 exhibition “The Architectural Model—Tool, Fetish, Small Utopia," and in museums such as the Museum of Modern Art in New York and the Heinz Architectural Center in Pittsburgh. A detailed study of Conrad's oeuvre in the context of American mid-century model making was prepared by Teresa Fankhänel.
