= Charles Yardley Turner =

American artist (1850–1919)

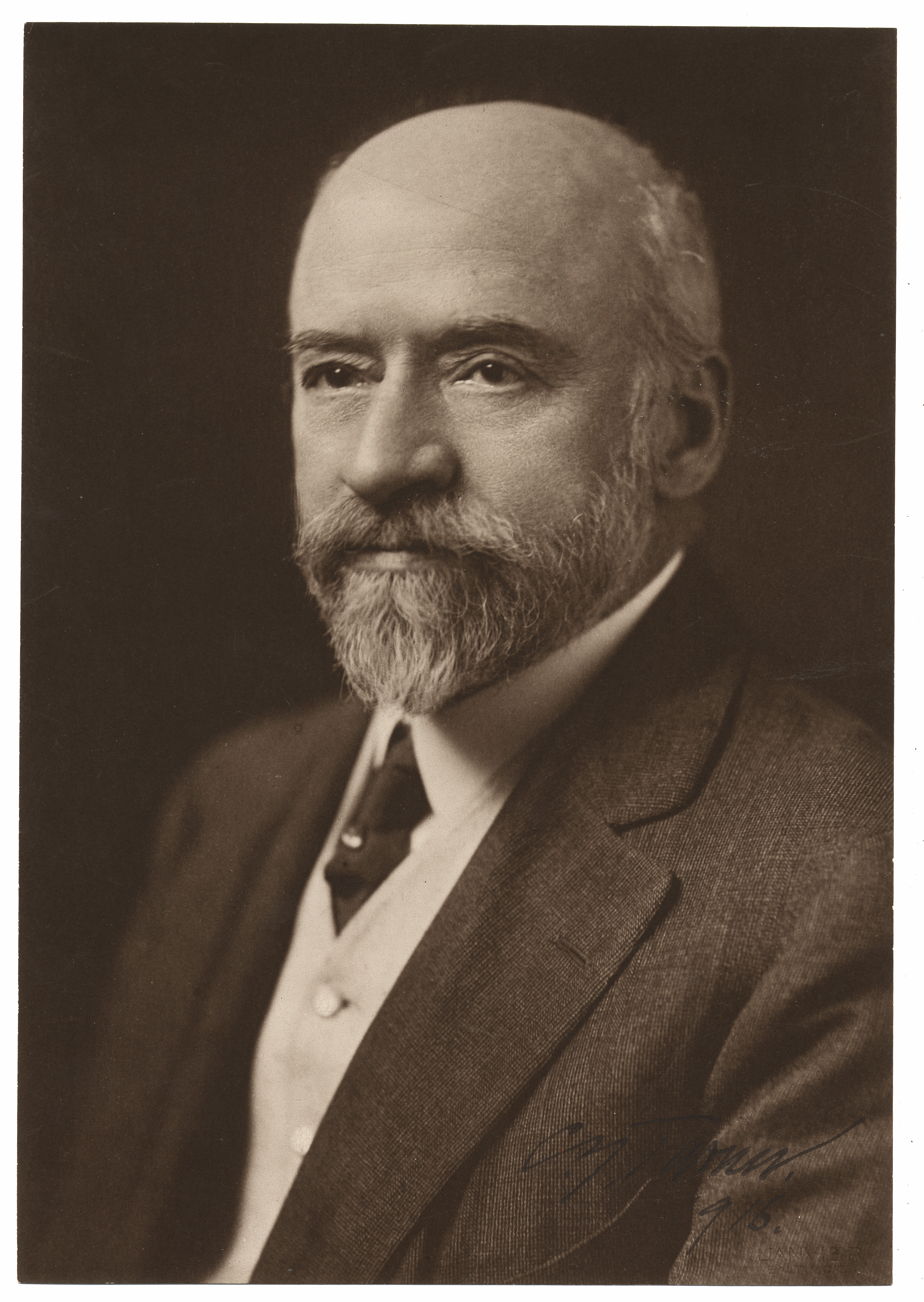
- C. Y. Turner (1916)
- Born: November 25, 1850; Baltimore, Maryland
- Died: January 1, 1919 (aged 68); Manhattan, New York City
- Education: Maryland Institute; National Academy of Design; Art Students' League of New York
- Known for: historical paintings, murals
- Notable work: The Courtship of Miles Standish (1883); The Burning of the "Peggy Stuart" (1903); Molly Pitcher at the Battle of Monmouth (1907); General Washington at Fort Lee (1910)
- Awards: 1884 Second Hallgarten Prize (NAD); 1893 Medal for Excellence (World's Columbian Exposition); 1912 Medal of Honor for Painting (Architectural League of New York)

Charles Yardley "C. Y." Turner (November 25, 1850 – January 1, 1919) was an American painter, illustrator, muralist and teacher. His genre scenes and American historical paintings were popularized through engravings and book illustrations.

== Biography ==
Turner was born in Baltimore, Maryland, the youngest son of lumber merchant John Comegys Turner (1816-1876) and Hanah Bartlett Turner (1817-1863). His parents were Quakers, and he and his eight siblings attended the school of the Lombard Street Meeting House. He continued as a member of the Baltimore Monthly Meeting until his death.

As a young man, he worked for Baltimore architect Frank M. Davis during the day, while studying drawing at the evening school of the Maryland Institute for the Promotion of the Mechanic Arts at night. He moved to New York City in 1872, where he worked as a colorist in a photographic studio during the day, and attended the National Academy of Design evening school at night. He was one of the founders of the Art Students League of New York in 1875, and studied there for three years under Walter Shirlaw. He moved to Paris in 1878, where he studied under Jean-Paul Laurens, Mihály Munkácsy and Léon Bonnat.

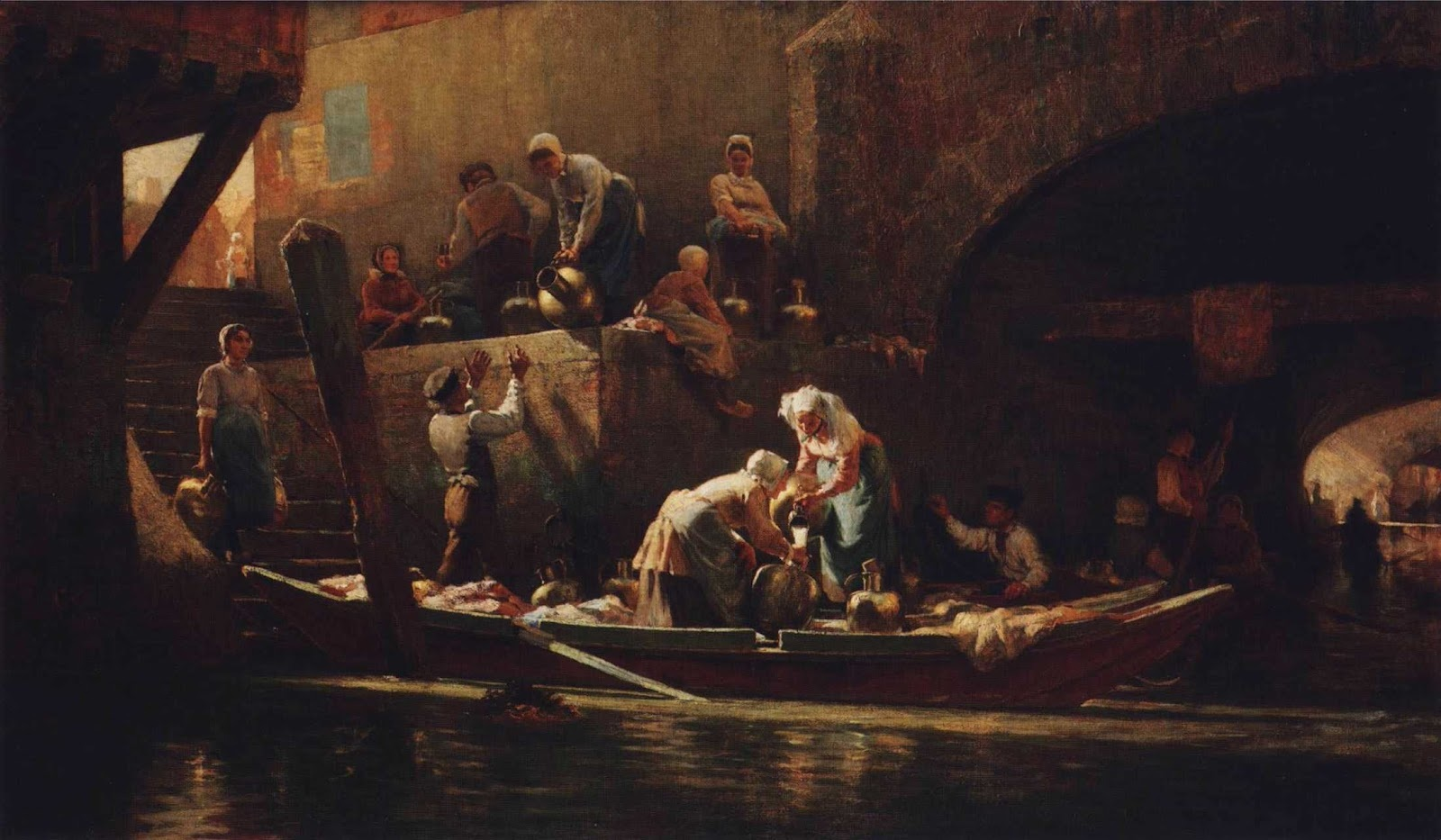
The Grand Canal, Dordrecht (1881)

He returned to New York in 1881, taught at a summer art school on Long Island, and began teaching at the Art Students League in the fall. He made a notable debut at the National Academy of Design's 1882 annual exhibition, exhibiting two works—The Grand Canal, Dordrecht (1881), that he had painted in the Netherlands, and The Days That Are No More (1882), that he had painted on Long Island. The latter depicted a young widow and small child leaving a country graveyard, and was inspired by a line from Tennyson—"O death in life, the days that are no more."

Turner painted three works based on the Henry Wadsworth Longfellow poem, The Courtship of Miles Standish. Engravings of two of these were best-sellers, and produced royalties for the artist. His second painting in the series, Bridal Procession of John Alden and Priscilla (1886), was bought for the Metropolitan Museum of Art.

Turner began teaching at the National Academy of Design in 1889. Among his NAD students were Zelma Baylos, Abraham Bogdanove, Mary Allison Doull, Harry Leith-Ross, Peter Béla Mayer, Frederick Ballard Williams and Arthur William Woelfle.

In 1912 he became director of his Baltimore alma mater, renamed the Maryland Institute School of Art and Design.

=== Muralist ===
Turner painted his first murals in the early 1890s. His philosophy was that a mural should complement the architecture, not compete with it:

When we come to mural painting the picture should neither project from the wall nor make a hole in it. The object must not be smothered, and the original form lost. When the decoration becomes more prominent than the object decorated, it is bad decoration. Such treatment would be as false as making the figures in a carpet stand up so prominently as to cause us to experience a sense of striking against them as we walk.

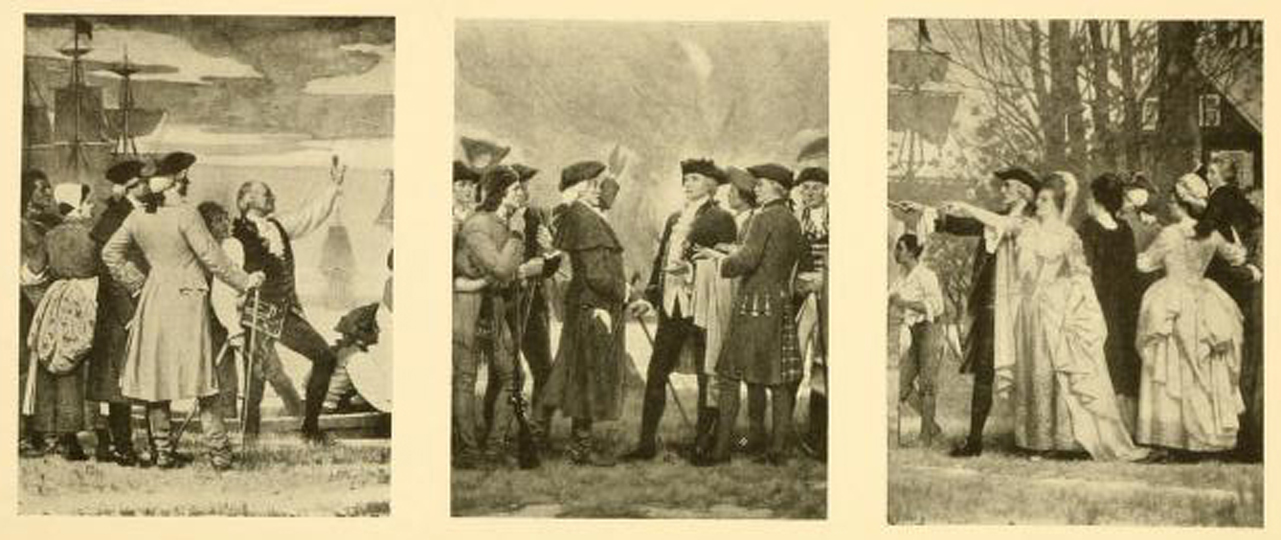
The Burning of the "Peggy Stewart" (1903), panels #1, #3 & #5, Baltimore City Courthouse

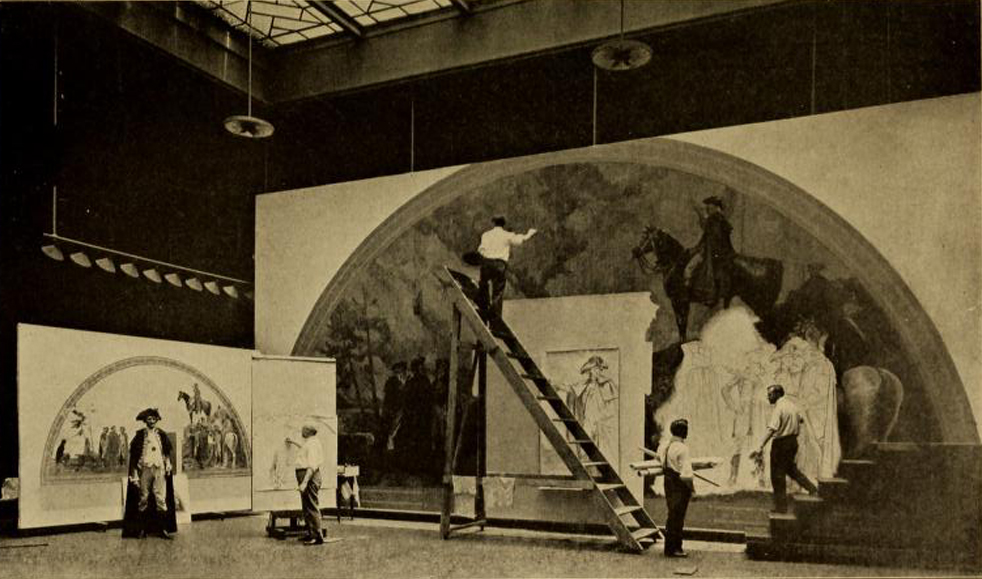
Turner and assistants at work on the General Washington at Fort Lee mural for Hudson County Courthouse, c.1910

His mural The Triumph of Manhattan (1896) was a cycloramic view of New York Harbor, that encircled the Hotel Manhattan's rotunda. In the foreground, it featured Native Americans, European colonists, and historical figures such as Benjamin Franklin, Washington Irving, Samuel Morse, Robert Fulton, and John Jay, all paying their respects to the Greek-gowned "Empress Manhattan," who was surrounded by female attendants. Turner later painted a mural of Greek gods and goddesses for the hotel's lobby.

One of Turner's most famous murals is The Burning of the "Peggy Stewart" (1903), painted for the Baltimore City Courthouse. It depicts an incident from 1774—often called the "Annapolis Tea Party"—when the American boycott against imported British tea was at its height. Loyalist merchant Anthony Stewart was awaiting the arrival of his ship Peggy Stewart at Annapolis. One of his business partners had tried to get around the boycott by loading more than a ton of tea aboard the Peggy Stewart in London, hidden in seventeen crates marked "Linen." The deception was supposedly discovered in mid-voyage, but when the ship arrived at Annapolis, the partner refused to pay the Crown tax on the tea. The Peggy Stewart was barred from docking at the city or unloading any of its cargo until the Crown tax was paid, so Stewart finally paid it himself. His action set off a riot outside his house, with a radical mob threatening to burn both Stewart's house and the ship. The mob's leaders forced Stewart into a devil's bargain, they would spare his house if he set fire to the ship himself. Turner's 5-panel mural features Stewart at far left, in shirt sleeves having just set the fire, and a tableau of life-size figures in the foreground, set against a background of flames. It is 10 ft (3.0 m) in height and 45 ft (14 m) in length.

In 1905, the New York City Board of Education instituted a policy of commissioning permanent works of art for its school buildings. The first commission went to Turner—two large murals depicting the 1825 opening of the Erie Canal, for the DeWitt Clinton High School at 10th Avenue & West 58th Street, Manhattan. The first mural, Entering the Mohawk Valley, depicted Governor DeWitt Clinton and other dignitaries aboard the first barge to transverse the canal from Lake Erie to the Hudson River. The second, Marriage of the Waters, depicted a famous ceremony in which Governor Clinton poured an urn of Lake Erie water into the Atlantic Ocean. Turner was paid $3,500, one half percent of the building's construction cost. The school relocated to The Bronx in 1929, and the murals were taken down and reinstalled in the library of the new building.

General Washington at Fort Lee (1910) was an unusual choice of subject for a mural, since it depicted one of the Continental Army's most humiliating defeats in the Revolutionary War. Fort Washington was located at the northern end of Manhattan Island, on a bluff of high land along the Hudson River. Fort Lee was located on the opposite side of the Hudson, atop the Palisades, in New Jersey. The twin forts were about 1 mi (1.6 km) apart—separated by the width of the river—and both had been built in Summer 1776 to prevent British warships from sailing any further north up the Hudson. On the morning of November 16, 1776, the British Army executed a massive assault on Fort Washington, with some 8,000 soldiers attacking from the north, east and south. Meanwhile, HMS Pearl bombarded the fort with cannon fire from the east, and prevented Washington from sending boats with reinforcements from New Jersey. The 3,000 Continentals garrisoned at the fort fought through most of the day, hoping that reinforcements would be able to cross the Hudson by night, but the British overwhelmed the garrison by mid-afternoon. The commander of the fort surrendered, and more than 2,800 Continentals were taken prisoner. Turner's mural depicts Washington (on horseback) and his staff monitoring the attack from the opposite side of the Hudson, but powerless to intervene. It was this defeat and Washington's subsequent retreat that inspired Thomas Paine to pen The American Crisis, and its famous opening sentence—"These are the times that try men's souls."

=== Colorist ===
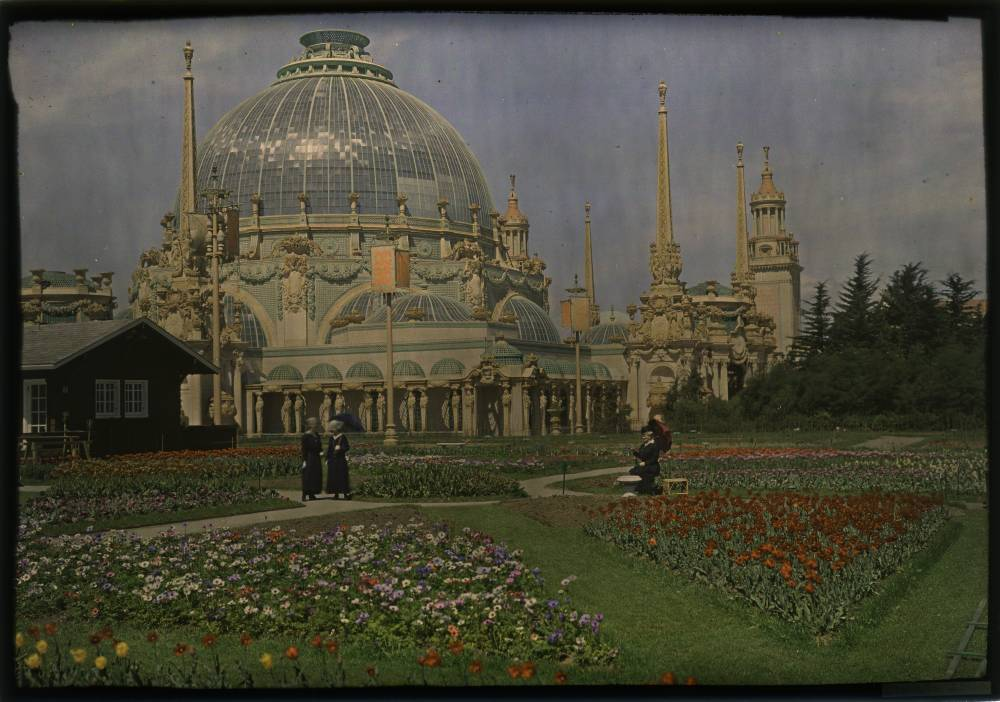
Horticulture Building, 1901 Pan-American Exposition, Buffalo, New York

Muralist Francis Davis Millet was selected to be director of decoration for the 1893 World's Columbian Exposition in Chicago, and Turner, who had been runner-up for the job, agreed to be his assistant. Eight years later, Turner was colorist for the entire 1901 Pan-American Exposition in Buffalo, New York. The Chicago exposition had been nicknamed "The White City," because of the color of all but one of its major buildings. Turner described his ambitious color scheme for the Buffalo exposition:

It was for us to make the color of the exposition tell something, the same story as the sculpture. Accordingly, we have used bright, brilliant hues on the buildings that are suggestive of the early life of man. The horticultural building, for instance, has orange ornaments, with details in brilliant blue, green, yellow and rose. The government building is prevailingly in rich yellow. As one goes up the esplanade, the decorations become more sober. The music hall has a scheme of dull red; the machinery building in green-gray. The electric tower is given over to a harmony of green and gold on an ivory ground. Here the color-key of the whole exposition is struck. The lovely green of Niagara water, rich as the green on the peacock's wing, appears in its purity on the electric tower, to be echoed in every structure of the show-city. Not a building is there which is without its notes of Niagara-green.

=== Awards and honors ===
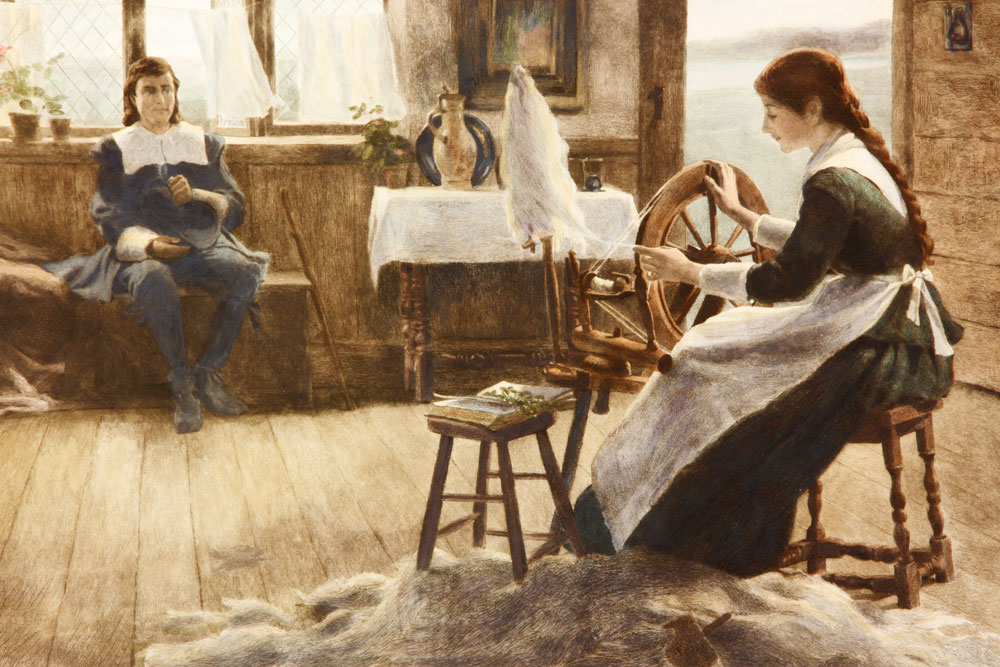
The Courtship of Miles Standish (1883)

The National Academy of Design awarded Turner the 1884 Second Hallgarten Prize (and $200 cash award) for The Courtship of Miles Standish, the first of his "Longfellow" paintings. He exhibited The Days That Are No More at the 1886 Paris Salon, and received an Honorable Mention. He exhibited The Days That Are No More at the 1889 Exposition Universelle in Paris, and again received an Honorable Mention. He exhibited eleven oil paintings at the 1893 World's Columbian Exposition—including The Grand Canal, Dordrecht, The Days That Are No More, and The Courtship of Miles Standish—and was awarded a Medal for Excellence. The Architectural League of New York awarded Turner its 1912 Medal of Honor for Painting, for his mural General Washington at Fort Lee, at the Hudson County Courthouse in Jersey City, New Jersey.

The National Academy of Design elected Turner an Associate in 1883, and an Academician in 1886. He served as NAD's vice-president, 1903–1904. He was a member of the American Water Color Society and the Society of American Etchers. He served as president the Art Students League of New York, 1884–1885 and 1900–1901. He was a founding member of the National Society of Mural Painters, and served as its president, 1904–1909. He was a member of the Architectural League of New York, and served as its vice-president.

Turner joined the Salmagundi Club in 1872, and served as its president, 1883–1889. He was a member of the Century Association for more than thirty years, and painted a group portrait of more than forty of its members—A Saturday Evening at the Century (1894)—that included a cameo of himself.

=== Personal ===
Turner never married. He preferred to be called "C. Y.," because, he said, his initials "made a combination that really had more individuality than 'Charles Yardley'."

He contracted Spanish flu, and died of pneumonia at Presbyterian Hospital, New York City, prior to dawn on January 1, 1919. Some sources list the year of his death as 1918, and others as 1919.

== Selected works ==
=== Murals ===
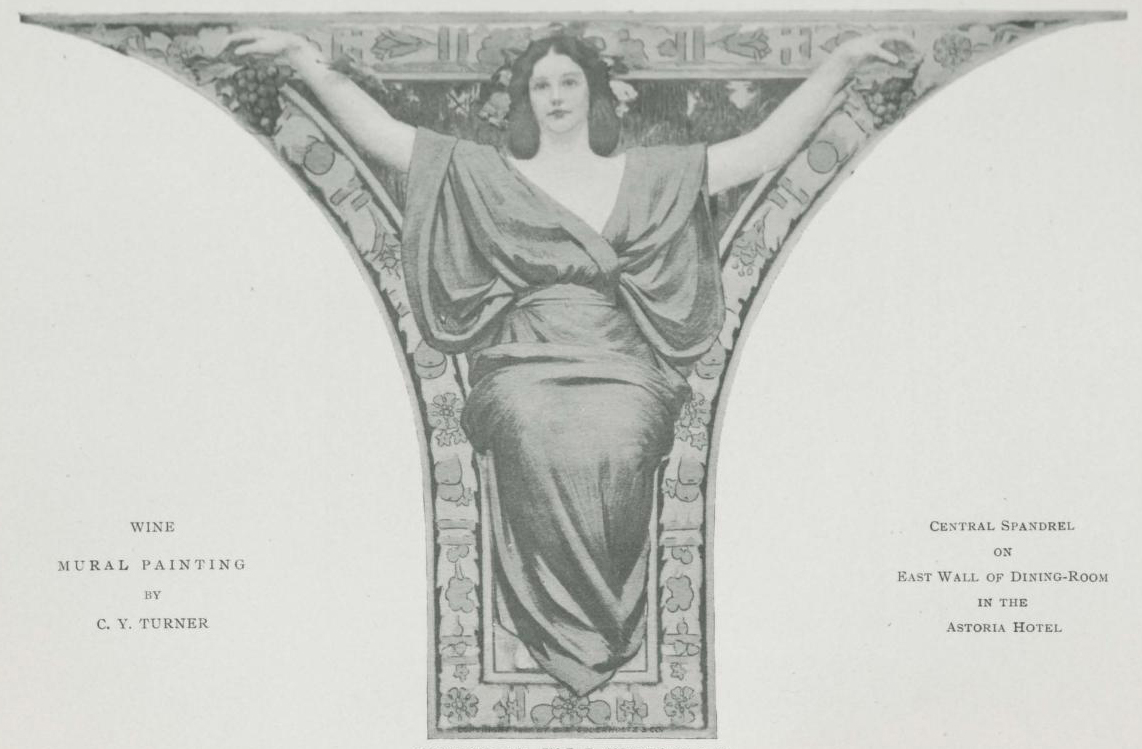
Wine (1897), spandrel mural for Astor Dining Room, Astoria Hotel, Manhattan, New York City

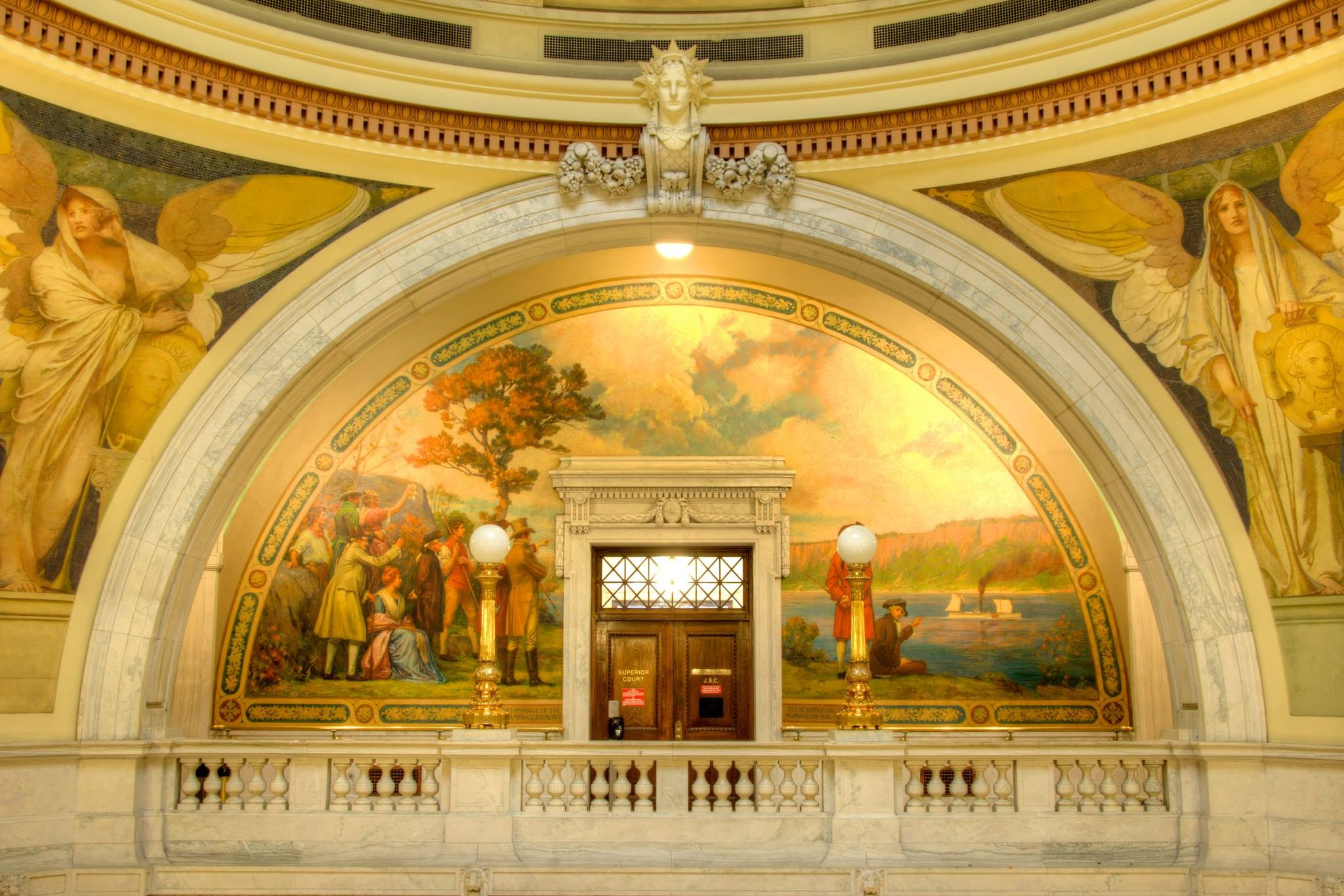
The First Passage of the Steamer Clermont to Albany, 1807 (1910), Hudson County Courthouse, Jersey City, New Jersey

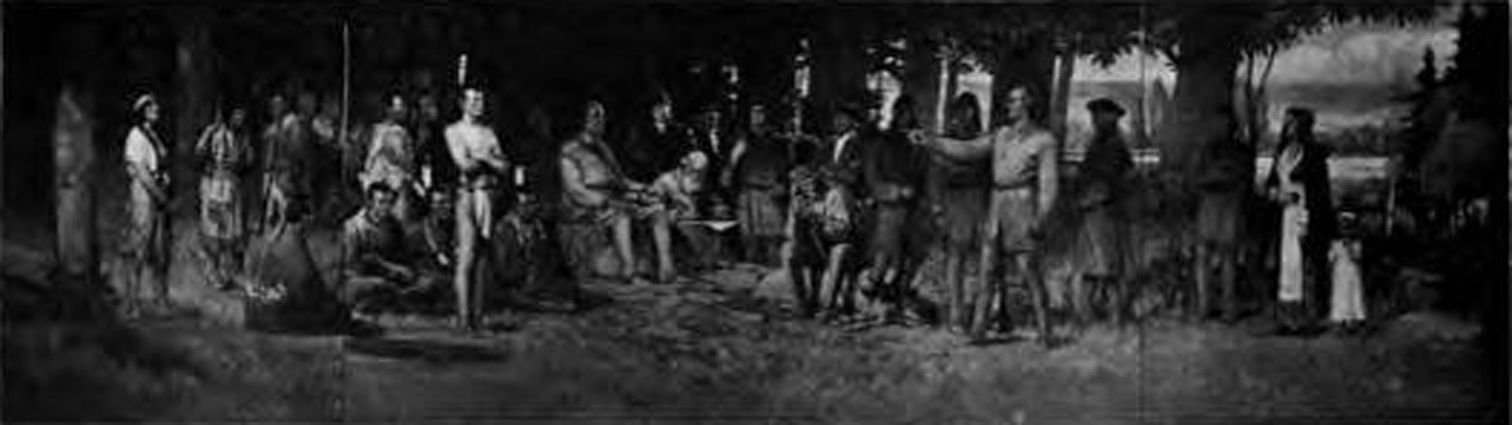
First Trial in the County (1911), Mahoning County Courthouse, Youngstown, Ohio

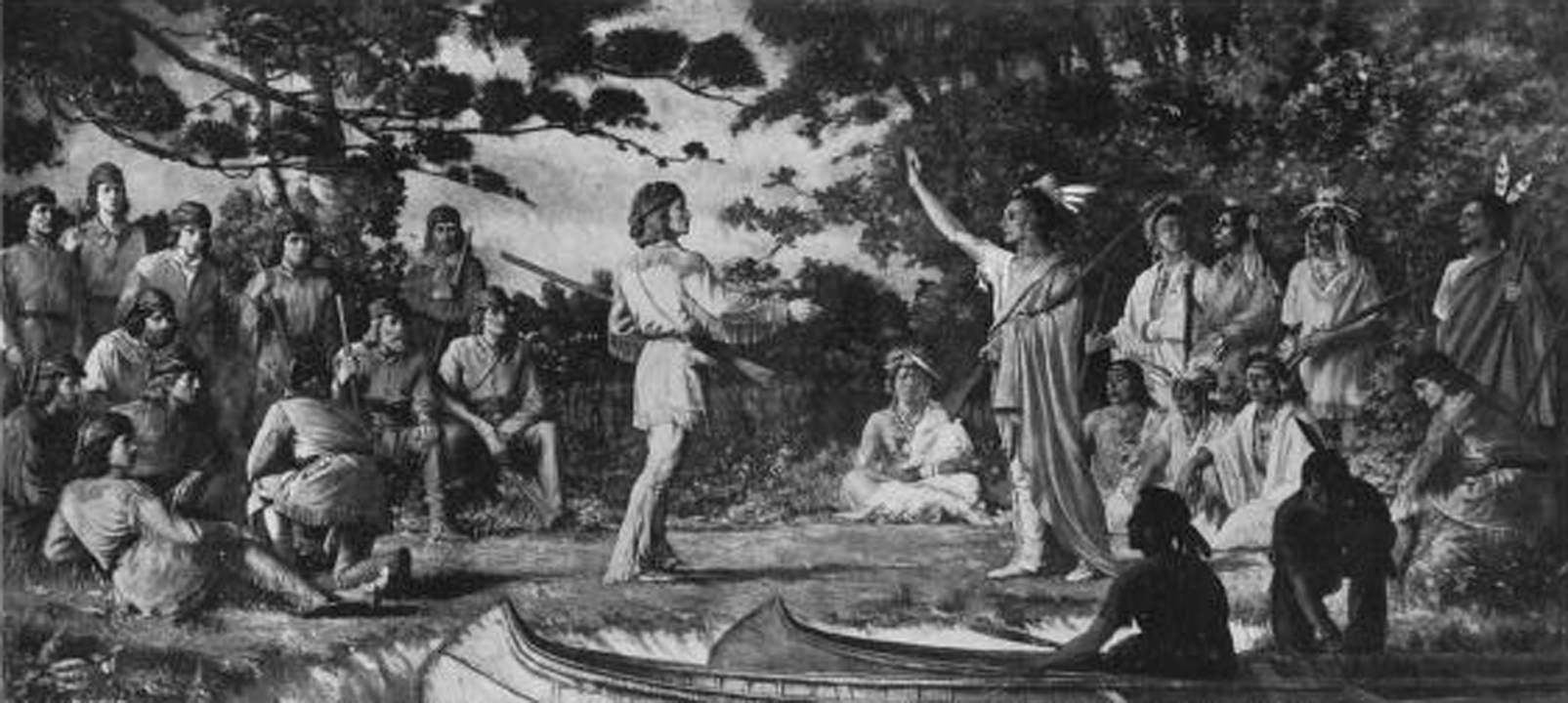
Conclave of Pontiac and Rogers' Rangers at the Cuyahoga River, 1760 (1912), Cuyahoga County Courthouse, Cleveland, Ohio

- Dining Room mural, Theodore Marburg house, 14 West Mount Vernon Place, Baltimore, Maryland, 1891-1896.
- Hotel Manhattan, New York City, demolished 1961.
  - The Triumph of Manhattan, 1896. The 3-part mural encircled the hotel's Rotunda.
  - The Gods of Greece, 1898, Lobby
  - The Four Seasons, 1900-1901
  - The Days, 1900-1901
- Astor Dining Room frieze and spandrels, Astoria Hotel, New York City, 1897, demolished 1929.
- Ceiling mural, National Bank of Commerce, 31 Nassau Street, Manhattan, New York City, 1897, demolished 1966
- History of the Island of Martinique, Hotel Martinque, 32nd Street and Broadway, New York City, 1898, 4 lunette murals
- Appellate Division Courthouse of New York State, Manhattan, New York City, 1899
  - Law
  - Equity
- "Sir Walter Raleigh" murals, Raleigh Hotel, Washington, D.C., demolished 1964.
  - Sir Walter Raleigh's Home in England, Lobby, 1899-1900
  - The Sailing of the Raleigh Expedition—1584, Lobby, 1899-1900
  - The Destruction of the Spanish Fleet—1588, Lobby, 1899-1900
  - Rathskeller mural: 9 panels, 1899-1900
- Baltimore Court House, Baltimore, Maryland
  - Barter with the Indians for Land in Southern Maryland, 1634, 1901-1902
  - The Burning of the "Peggy Stewart", 1903
- Interior decoration, New York Chamber of Commerce Building, 65 Liberty Street, Manhattan, New York City, 1903
- "Opening of the Erie Canal" murals, DeWitt Clinton High School, Manhattan, New York City, 1905
  - Entering the Mohawk Valley, 12.5 ft (3.8 m) X 15.75 ft (4.80 m)
  - Marriage of the Waters, 12.5 ft (3.8 m) X 15.75 ft (4.80 m)
  - The school relocated from Manhattan to The Bronx in 1929. The murals were taken down and installed in the library of the new building.
- Essex County Court House, Newark, New Jersey, 1906
  - Landing of the Milfordites at New England, May 17, 1666
- The Great Prophets, St. Andrew's Methodist Episcopal Church, 120 West 76th Street, Manhattan, New York City, 1906, 4 pendentive murals. Church interior
  - The building is now West Side Institutional Synagogue, and the murals are hidden above a drop ceiling.
- Rotunda murals, Hudson County Courthouse, Jersey City, New Jersey, 1910
  - General Washington at Fort Lee, November 16, 1776
  - The First Passage of the Steamer Clermont to Albany, 1807,
- First Trial by Law, Mahoning County, Mahoning County Courthouse, Youngstown, Ohio, 1911
  - Three of Turner's preparatory sketches, portraits of Native Americans, were his 1919 bequest to Youngstown's Butler Institute of American Art.
  - A fourth Turner preparatory sketch was a 1961 gift to the Institute.
- Court of Appeals Court Room, Cuyahoga County Courthouse, Cleveland, Ohio, 1912
  - The Conclave of Pontiac and Rogers’ Rangers at the Cuyahoga River, November 1760, 13 ft (4.0 m) X 28 ft (8.5 m)
  - The Trial of Captain John Smith at Jamestown, June 10, 1607, 13 ft (4.0 m) X 28 ft (8.5 m)
- "History of Transportation in Wisconsin" murals, North Hearing Room, Wisconsin State Capitol, 1917
  - Indians with Horses
  - Trappers in Canoes
  - Stage Coach
  - Steam and Motor

=== Paintings ===
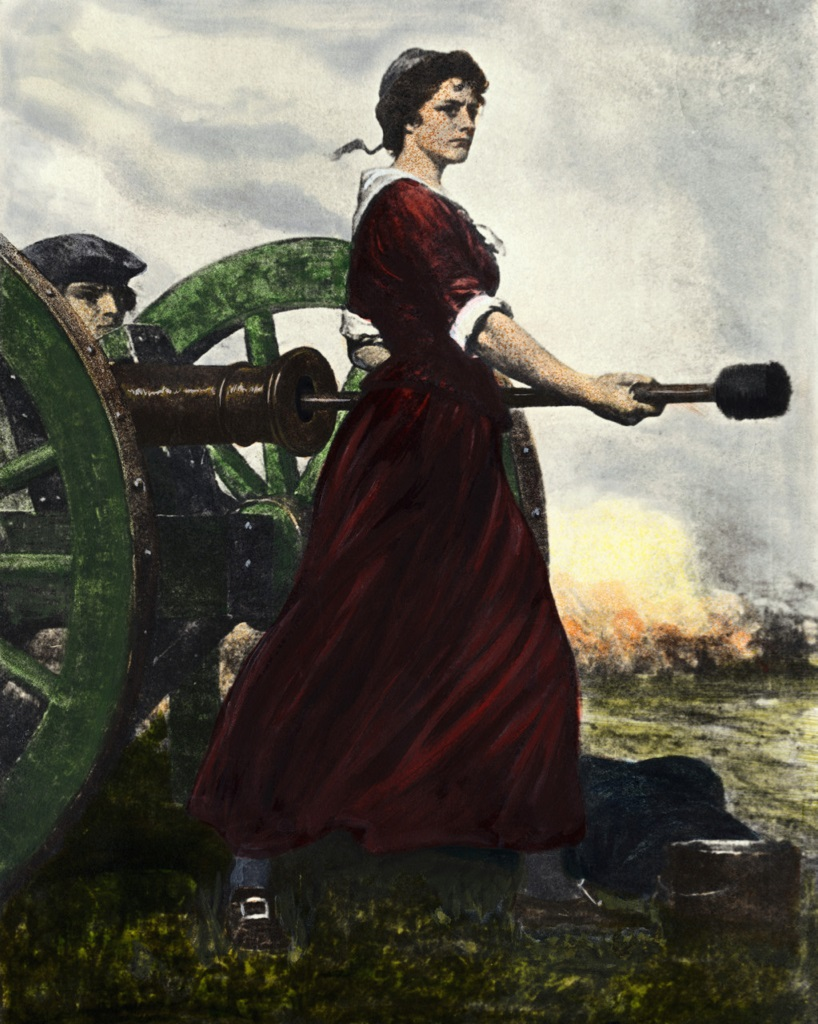
Molly Pitcher at the Battle of Monmouth (c.1907)

- The Grand Canal, Dordrecht, 1881. Exhibited at the 1893 World's Columbian Exposition.
- The Days That Are No More, 1882. Honorable Mention at the 1886 Paris Salon. Honorable Mention at the 1889 Exposition Universelle. Exhibited at the 1893 World's Columbian Exposition.
- The Courtship of Miles Standish, 1883. Winner of the 1884 Hallgarten Prize from NAD. Exhibited at the 1893 World's Columbian Exposition.
- Bridal Procession of John Alden and Priscilla, 1886. Deaccessioned from the Metropolitan Museum of Art, 1956.
- John Alden's Letter, Union League Club, Chicago, c.1888. Exhibited at the 1893 World's Columbian Exposition.
- An Emblem of Mortality, National Academy of Design Museum, Manhattan, New York City, 1888.
- The Pride of the Farm, c.1890. Exhibited at the 1893 World's Columbian Exposition.
- Saw Wood and Say Nothing, 1891. Exhibited at the 1893 World's Columbian Exposition.
- A Dordrecht Milkmaid, c.1892. Exhibited at the American Water Color Society in 1892.
- Modeling the First Staff Ornaments, World's Columbian Exposition, 1893, 1894. Deaccessioned from the DeYoung Memorial Museum, 2010.
- A Saturday Evening at the Century, Century Association, Manhattan, New York City, 1894. Depicts 40+ members of the Century Association (including a cameo of Turner) in conversation at the club.
- Chrysanthemums, 1907. Deaccessioned from Brooklyn Museum of Art
- Moved by the Spirit: Margaretta Walton Preaching, Stony Run Friends Meeting, Baltimore, Maryland, 1907.
- Molly Pitcher at the Battle of Monmouth, c.1907
- Portrait of Walter Shirlaw, c.1908. Turner had studied under Shirlaw at the Art Students League of New York.
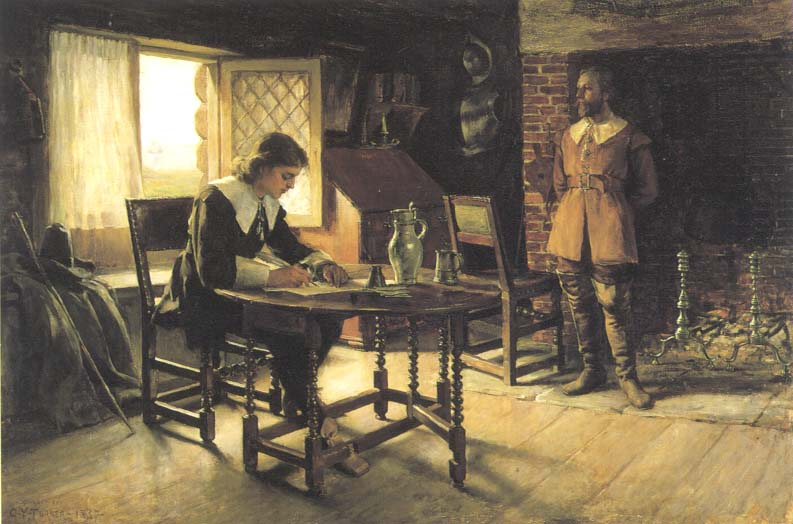
John Alden's Letter (c.1888), Union League Club of Chicago

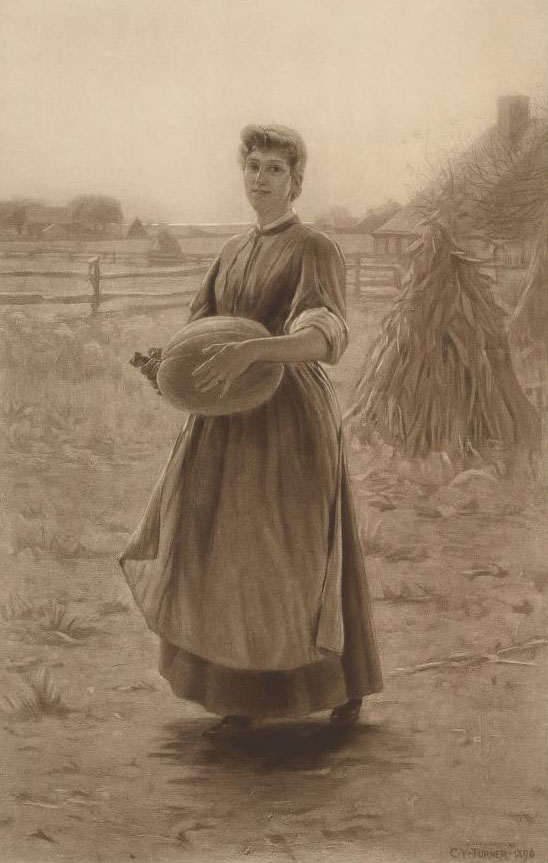
The Pride of the Farm (c.1890)

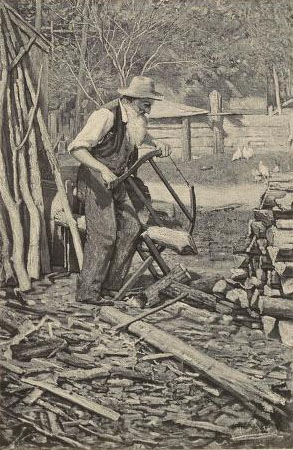
Saw Wood and Say Nothing (1891)

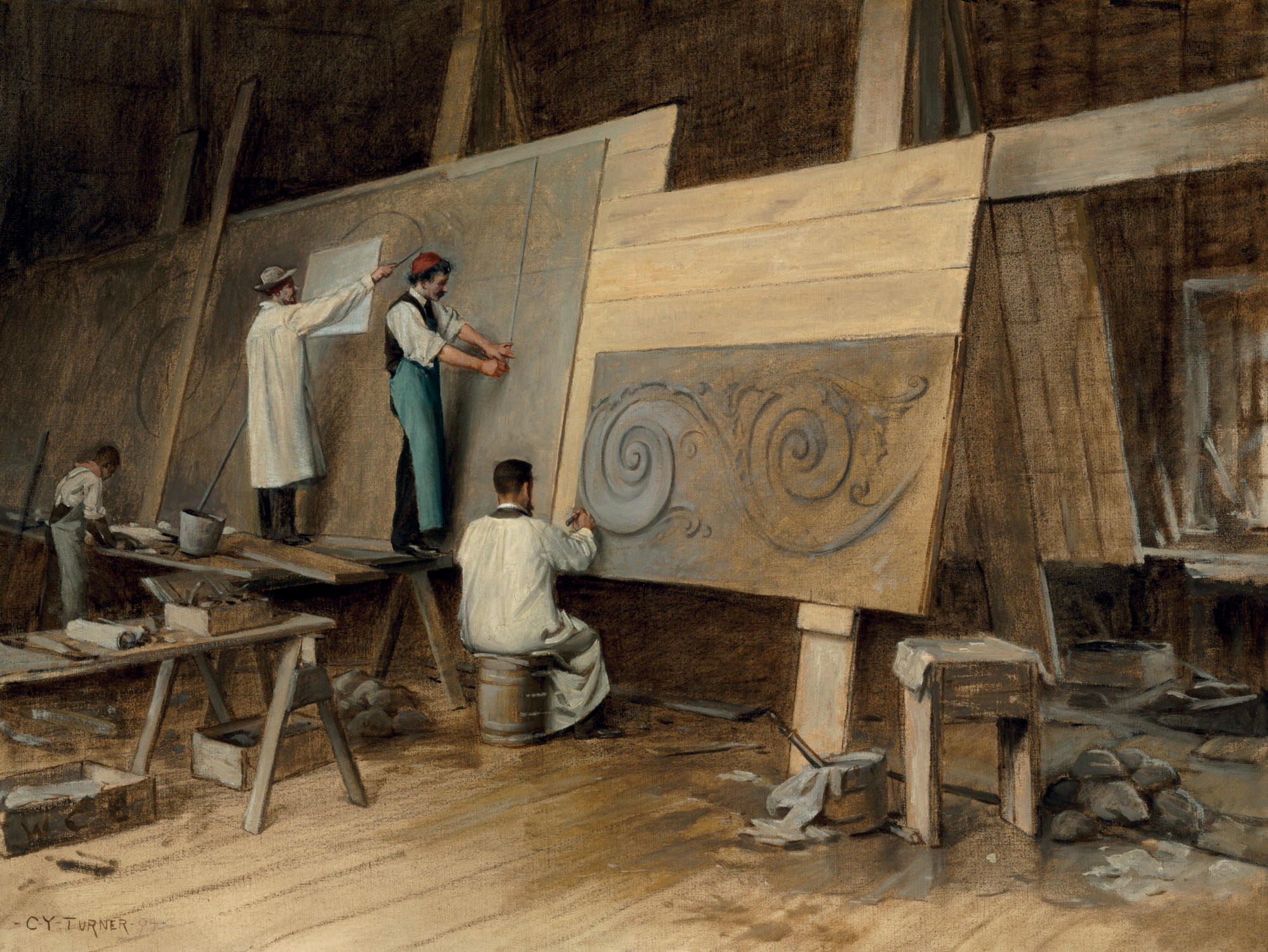
Modeling the First Staff Ornaments, World's Columbian Exposition, 1893 (1894)

== See also ==
- List of American painters exhibited at the 1893 World's Columbian Exposition

== Sources ==
- Obituary: Charles Yardley Turner, American Art News, Vol. 17, No. 13 (Jan. 4, 1919), p. 7.
- Blashfield, Edwin Howland, Mural Painting in America: The Scammon Lectures, delivered before the Art Institute of Chicago, March 1912, and since greatly enlarged, Charles Scribner's Sons, New York, 1913.
- Brief online biography
- Rines, George Edwin, ed. (1920). "Turner, Charles Yardley" . Encyclopedia Americana.
