= Charles Clement =

Charles Clement may refer to:

- Charles Clement (Wisconsin politician) (1815–1886)
- Charles Clement, Count of Pellegrini (1720–1796), Austrian field marshal
- Charles M. Clement (1855–1934), U.S. Army general and Pennsylvania politician

== See also ==
- Charles Clements (disambiguation)
