= Charles P. Clemens =

American politician

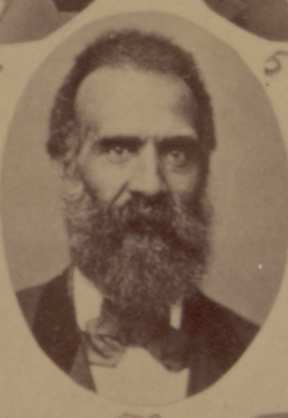

Charles P. Clemens (1842 – November 29, 1895) was a soldier, reverend, and state legislator in Mississippi. He represented Clarke County, Mississippi in the Mississippi House of Representatives in 1874 and 1875.

He was born 1842 in Darke County, Ohio to Layton and Mary Clemens. He served as an engineer in the 45th United States Colored Infantry Regiment until being discharged June 8, 1865 for disability from gastritis and heart disease.

In 1873, the Weekly Clarion reported on his candidacy describing him as a colored "carpetbagger" and accused him of abandoning his wife and four children when he moved to Mississippi to seek office. However, on his army discharge papers he was listed as widowed and his next of kin was listed as a daughter named Nora Brown. He took the oath of office January 21, 1874.

During his time in the house he was a member of several committees including Public Education, Federal Relations, Railroads, and Public Works. He was a member of The Republican Fifth Congressional Executive Committee in 1875.

He was buried at the Forest Hill cemetery in Piqua, Ohio.

== See also ==
- African American officeholders from the end of the Civil War until before 1900
