= Robert Clements =

Robert Clements may refer to:

- Robert George Clements (1880–1947), physician and fellow of the Royal College of Surgeons
- Robert Clements, 1st Earl of Leitrim (1732–1804), Irish nobleman and politician
- Robert Clements, 4th Earl of Leitrim (1847–1892), Irish soldier and nobleman
- Robert Clements (footballer), Scottish footballer, played for Scotland in 1891
- Robert Clements (Nebraska politician) (born 1950), American politician and businessman
- Robert Bermingham Clements, Viscount Clements (1805–1839), Irish politician
- Robert Clements (1664–1722), Irish MP for Newry 1715–22
- Robert Clements (1724–1747), Irish MP for Cavan Borough 1745–47
- Robert S. Clements, founder of Clements Worldwide, a global insurance company
