= Clements twins =

American twin models (born 2010)

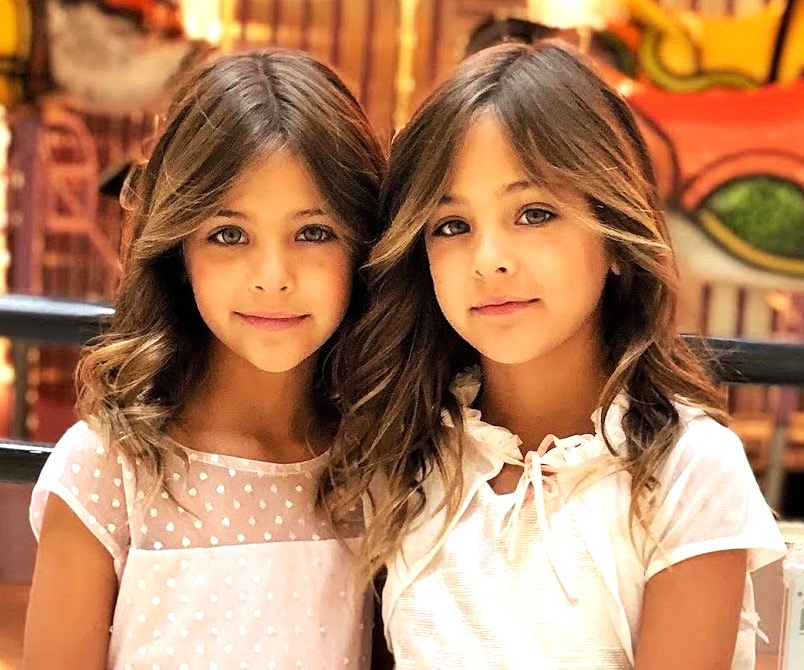
- The Clements twins try on dresses at a luxury designer clothing store in 2018
- Born: Ava Marie and Leah Rose Clements; July 7, 2010 (age 16)
- Website: www.kaveah.com

Ava Marie Clements and Leah Rose Clements (born July 7, 2010), known as the Clements twins, are American models and social media personalities who are identical twins. When the twins were seven years old, their parents signed with two modelling agencies. Several news outlets have referred to them as "the most beautiful twins in the world", By January 2025, they had amassed over 2.1 million followers on Instagram.

== Personal lives ==
Ava Marie and Leah Rose Clements were born on July 7, 2010, to Kevin Clements, a high school swim coach, and Jaqi Clements. They have one other sibling. They are from Orange County, California.

Kevin was diagnosed with cancer in 2019. The twins used their Instagram account to help raise funds and find a donor for his bone marrow transplant.

== Career ==
Kevin and Jaqi wanted to start the twins in modeling when the twins were six months old, but they held off on this plan—due to the amount of time needed to make this commitment—until the twins turned seven. At the time, the Clements' neighbor wanted models to help advertise a newly opened children's boutique. The twins posed for pictures together, and Jaqi sent the images to contacts she had collected from her first attempt to get the twins a modeling career. She met with various modeling agencies, and eventually signed contracts with two agencies: one in Orange County and another in Los Angeles. A year after starting their modeling careers, the twins had gained more than half a million followers on Instagram. The number grew to 1.5 million by December 2019, and nearly 2 million by August 2023.
