= Universal Warning Records =

Independent record label

- Founded: 2001
- Founder: Tim Martinkovich, Clint Weiler, Mike Varga
- Distributor: Hostile City Industries
- Genre: Indie, punk, rock, hardcore
- Country of origin: U.S.
- Location: Royersford, Pennsylvania
- Official website: www.universalwarningrecords.com

Universal Warning Records is a record label and video production company located in the greater Philadelphia area. Universal Warning produces and releases independent music from local and national bands, as well as produces music videos, live concerts for DVD and digital transmission as well as music documentaries, primarily from the indie, punk, and hardcore genres.

== History ==
The label was established in the Spring of 2000 by founders Tim Martinkovich, Mike Varga, and Clint Weiler. The three met while studying at Kutztown University. The label was created as a foundation for the partners' punk-alternative band The Covert Agency and to promote area acts that the partners appreciated.

After releasing a compilation of regional Pennsylvanian bands entitled The Warning Compilation during the founders last year in Kutztown, Martinkovitch moved the label and started their first office in Denver Colorado in Summer 2001. Universal Warning Records went on to release full lengths of several Colorado bands such as ManAlive! and Against Tomorrow's Sky. Later that year the label branched out and began signing artists as far south as Louisiana, where Victim of Modern Age ruled the Lafayette scene.

In the Spring of 2008, Weiler left his position as publicist for the label to pursue free lance work and business ventures including a bobble head company called Aggronautix.

Since its foundation in 2000, Universal Warning Records has had offices in Denver, Colorado, Richmond, Virginia and Royersford, Pennsylvania

To date, the label has released 19 CDs, 4 records, and 4 DVDs and filmed nearly 100 live shows including Earth Crisis and Sick of it All.

In May 2011, Universal Warning Records had its 10-year anniversary and the upstart of two new label imprints Fast Break Entertainment and Candy Colored Dragon.

== Industry relationships ==
- Universal Warning Records got their start releasing music by working with Ryan Fennical and his Marshalls Creek area recording studio.
- The label has had a close relationship with popular Philadelphia indie rockers The Jazz June and their subsequent incarnation Snakes & Music, having released albums and DVDs by the band.
- Universal Warning Records media has been distributed by Initial Records, Revelation Records, Lumberjack Distribution, Revolver, Very, Choke, Music Video Distributors, Carrot Top, and Hostile City Distribution.
- Founder Mike Varga also owned Grata Video and produced or worked on videos and DVDs for Andrew W.K., DEVO, Dr. Dog and The Queers

== Discography ==
Catalog number	Release date	Band	Album title	Classification	Medium	Genre
UWR001	05.12.2001	Covert Agency	"Orange" EP		CD	Rock/Punk/Alternative
UWR002	08.28.2001	Various Artists	The Warning Compilation	Full-length compilation	CD	Various
UWR003	09.18.2001	Forget About Tomorrow	And Then There's June	EP	CD	Punk-Alternative
UWR004	11.13.2001	Manalive!	Robotic Youth	EP	CD	Punk
UWR005	04.23.2002	Covert Agency	"Brown" EP	EP	CD	Punk-Alternative
UWR006	06.04.2002	Manalive!	Heart Hands And Mind	Full Length	CD	Crust Punk
UWR007	08.06.2002	Against Tomorrow’s Sky	Jump The Hedges First	Full Length	CD	Rock, Alternative
UWR008	08.27.2002	Victim of Modern Age	Victim of Modern Age	EP	CD	“Math Rock”, Indie Rock
UWR009	11.19.2002	Sadaharu	Punishment in Hi-Fi	EP	CD	Jazz-Metal
UWR010	05.20.2003	Snakes & Music	Truisms	Full Length	CD	Alternative, Indie
UWR011	09.23.2003	Victim of Modern Age	Channels Like Capillaries	Full Length	CD	“Math Rock”, Indie Rock
UWR012	06.14.2005	The Red Tops	Left For Dead	CD	Full Length	Metal, Hardcore
UWR013	11.15.2005	Geography	Life In Binary	Full Length	CD	Math Rock, Indie Rock
UWR014	03.12.2005	Sadaharu	New and Alternate Careers in Dance	Feature Length	DVD	Jazz-Metal
UWR016	05.19.2005	Murphy’s Law	Up With Us, Down With Them	Feature Length	DVD	Hardcore
UWR017	03.14.2006	Snakes & Music	Isabelle	Full Length	CD	Indie
UWR018	11.14.2006	Fifty Caliber Kiss	Armor Class Invincible	Full Length	CD	Metal
UWR019	12.05.2006	Holiday Body Bag	Dead Leaves	EP	CD	Punk, Hardcore
UWR020	03.20.2007	Wisdom In Chains	Die For Us Live	Feature	DVD	Hardcore
UWR021	06.12.2007	The Jazz June	The Scars to Prove it	CD/DVD Live Combo	CD/DVD	Indie Rock
UWR022	07.22.2008	House of Fire	S/T		CD	Indie
UWR023	09.23.2008	Watching the Moon	Perception Is Bent		CD	Indie
UWR024	07.21.2009	Wisdom in Chains	S/T		CD	Hardcore
UWR025	07.21.2009	Wisdom in Chains	S/T		Vinyl	Hardcore
UWR026	11.30.2010	Unite.Resist.	S/T		CD	Hardcore
UWR027	01.25.2011	The Queers	Live In Philly 06'		Vinyl	Punk

== Music videos ==
- Victim of Modern Age: Instruct to Destruct
- Holiday Bodybag: Dead Leaves
- American Speedway: Ship of Fools
- Fifty Caliber Kiss: Hide the Razor
- Wisdom In Chains: Back To The Ocean
- Wisdom In Chains: Chasing The Dragon

== Media released on other labels ==
Sick of it All “New York vs London” (released as a CD/DVD combo w/ Based on a True Story (Sick of It All album) Century Media
