= Tom Clements (disambiguation) =

Tom Clements (born 1953) is an American football player and coach.

Tom Clements may also refer to:

- Tom Clements (politician) (born 1951), South Carolina environmental activist and politician
- Tom Clements (public official) (1954–2013), head of the Colorado Department of Corrections
- Tom Clements (EastEnders), fictional character

== See also ==
- Thomas Clements (born 1916), Church of Ireland dignitary
