= Chris Clements =

Chris Clements may refer to:

- Chris Clements (animation director) (fl. 2000s–2020s), animation director with The Simpsons
- Chris Clements (fighter) (born 1976), Canadian mixed martial artist
- Chris Clements (footballer) (born 1990), English footballer
- Chris Clements (soccer) (born 1987), American soccer player

== See also ==
- Chris Clemence (born 1986), American bassist, songwriter, and music producer
