= Charles Clements =

Charles Clements may refer to:

- Charles Clements (footballer) (1882–1927), Australian rules footballer
- Charles Clements, 5th Earl of Leitrim (1879–1952), Irish nobleman and Unionist
- Charles H. Clements (born 1943), American politician
- Charles Skeffington Clements (1807–1877), Irish politician

== See also ==
- Charlie Clements (born 1987), English actor
- Charlie Clements (physician) (fl. 1980s–2020s), American physician and human rights activist
- Charles Clemens (disambiguation)
- Charles Clement (disambiguation)
