= Leo Clements =

Australian rules footballer

Personal information
- Full name: Leo Clements
- Born: 8 November 1907
- Died: 30 July 1979 (aged 71)
- Original team: South Bendigo

Playing career^{1}
Years	Club	Games (Goals)
1933–1934	Hawthorn	7 (0)
- ^{1} Playing statistics correct to the end of 1934.

Leo Clements (8 November 1907 – 30 July 1979) was an Australian rules footballer who played with Hawthorn in the Victorian Football League (VFL).
