= David Clements =

David Clements may refer to:

- Dave Clements (born 1945), Northern Irish footballer
- David Clements (figure skater) (born 1939), British figure skater
- David Clements (ice hockey) (born 1994), English ice hockey player
- David Clements (lawyer) (fl. from 2014), Former American lawyer
- David R. Clements (1819–1884), American politician

== See also ==
- David Clemens (disambiguation)
