= Andrew Clements (disambiguation) =

Andrew Clements (1949–2019), was an American author of children's books.

Andrew Clements may also refer to:

- Andy Clements (1955–2023), English footballer
- Andrew Jackson Clements (1832–1913), American surgeon and politician
- Andrew Clements, the main character of the TV show My Secret Identity

== See also ==
- Andrew Clemens (c. 1857–1894), sand artist
