= John Clements =

John Clements may refer to:

- John Clements (1757–1817), Irish MP and captain HEICS
- John Clements (actor) (1910–1988), English actor and producer
- John Clements (Australian politician) (1819–1884), Australian politician
- John James Clements (1872–1937), South African Victoria Cross recipient
- John Clements (GC) (1953–1976), George Cross recipient
- John Clements (footballer) (1867–1945), English footballer
- John R. Clements (1868–1946), president of Davis College
- John Allen Clements (1923–2024), American physician
- John Clements, American director of the Association for Renaissance Martial Arts
- Jack Clements (1864–1941), baseball player

== See also ==
- John Clements Wickham (1798–1864), naval officer and judge
- Jonathan Clements (born 1971), British author and screenwriter
- John Clement (disambiguation)
