= Jonathan Clements (columnist) =

British financial journalist and author (1963–2025)

- Born: January 2, 1963; London, England
- Died: September 21, 2025 (aged 62); Philadelphia, U.S.
- Education: University of Cambridge
- Occupations: Journalist, author
- Known for: Personal finance columnist at The Wall Street Journal and bringing index funds to the masses
- Spouse: Elaine
- Children: 2

Jonathan Clements (2 January 1963 – 21 September 2025) was a British financial journalist, author and blogger best known for his long tenure as a personal finance columnist at The Wall Street Journal.

== Early life and education ==
Clements was born in London on 2 January 1963. He was educated at Cambridge University.

== Career ==
Clements spent two decades as a personal finance columnist at The Wall Street Journal, where he wrote its long-running "Getting Going" column. Between 1994 and 2008, he published 1,009 columns on investing, financial planning, and related topics. He was among the earliest financial journalists to advocate for index funds, calling his support in a 1999 column an "obsession" that some readers found irritating. He left paper in April 2008, later worked in Citigroup's wealth management division, and went on to found the website HumbleDollar.

== Personal life ==
Clements was married to Elaine. He had two children.

=== Later life and death ===
In May 2024, at the age of 61, Clements was diagnosed with stage four lung cancer. In early June, his oncologist told him he had a year to live. At the time of his illness, he was living in Philadelphia with his wife.

Clements died in Philadelphia on 21 September 2025, at the age of 62.

In an obituary, The New York Times credited Clements with having "done more than nearly anyone who didn’t work at Vanguard to bring index funds to the masses."

== Bibliography ==
- Clements, Jonathan (2009). The Little Book of Main Street Money: 21 Simple Truths That Help Real People Make Real Money. Wiley. ISBN 9780470473238.
- Clements, Jonathan (2012). 48 and Counting: A Story of Money, Love and Bicycling. ISBN 9781478392132.
- Clements, Jonathan (2016). How to Think About Money. Harriman House. ISBN 9780857196965.
- Clements, Jonathan (2018). From Here to Financial Happiness: Enrich Your Life in Just 77 Days. Wiley. ISBN 9781119510963.
