= Joe Clements =

Joe or Joseph Clements may refer to:

- Joe Clements (American football) (1936–2015), American football player and coach
- Joseph Clements (actor) (fl. 1988–2016), Australian actor
- Akasha Song (Joseph Clements, born 1977/78), American illicit psychedelic drug producer

== See also ==
- Joseph Clemens (1862–1936), American missionary
