= Brett Clements =

Australian rugby league footballer

Personal information
- Full name: Brett Clements
- Born: 28 March 1973 (age 53) Sydney, New South Wales, Australia

Playing information
- Position: Hooker
Club
Years	Team	Pld	T	G	FG	P
1996	Canterbury-Bankstown	7	0	0	0	0
1997–98	Newcastle	19	1	0	0	4
	Total	26	1	0	0	4

Brett Clements (born 28 March 1973) is an Australian former professional rugby league footballer who played in the 1990s. He played for Canterbury-Bankstown in 1996 and the Newcastle Knights from 1997 to 1998.

== Playing career ==
Clements made his first grade debut for Canterbury in 1996 after spending the previous 4 seasons in reserve grade. In 1997, Clements joined Newcastle and made 13 appearances during the season including 2 finals matches but was not included in the premiership winning side that defeated Manly.

Clements made 6 appearances the following year for the defending premiers and his last match in first grade was the elimination final loss against his former club Canterbury.
