= George H. Clements (newspaper manager) =

American journalist

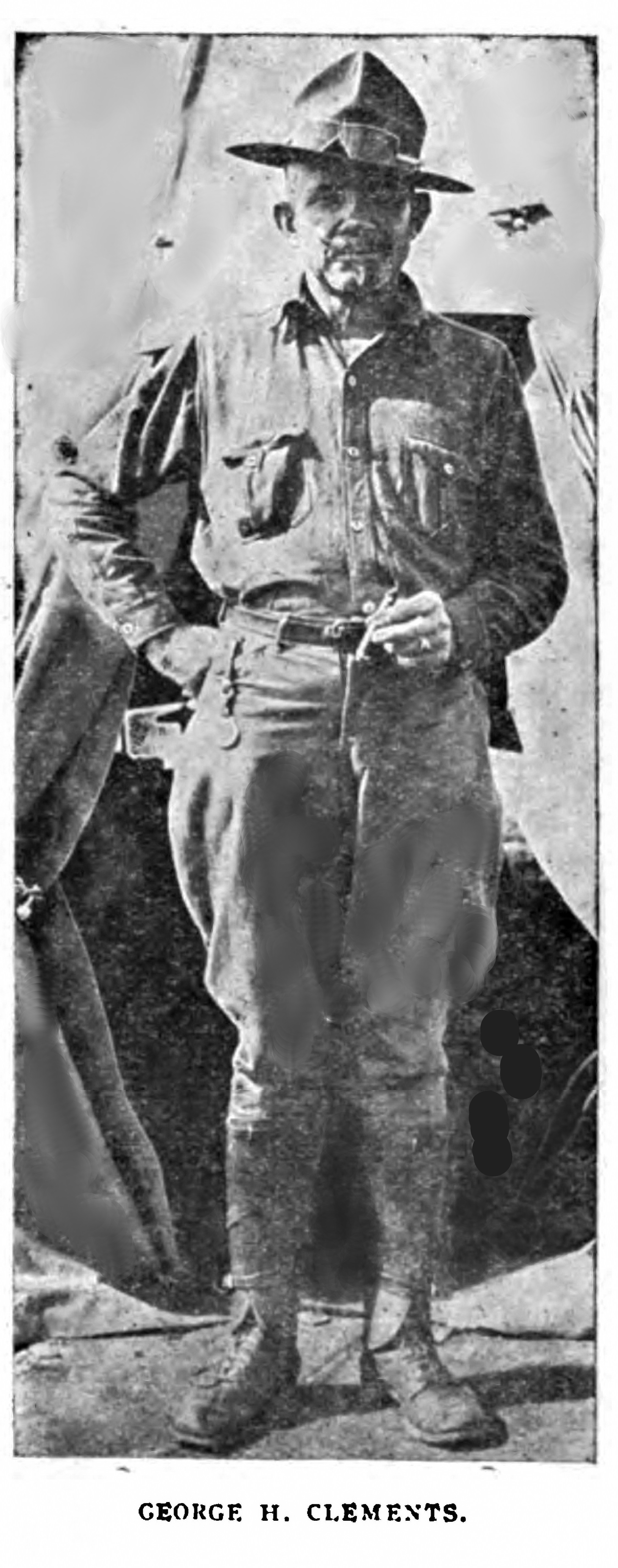
Journalist George H Clements

George H. Clements was an American journalist from El Paso, Texas. He was the manager of several newspapers including the St. Louis Star, The Milwaukee Sentinel, and The Fourth Estate.
