= Allen Clements =

American filmmaker (born 1978)

Allen J. Clements
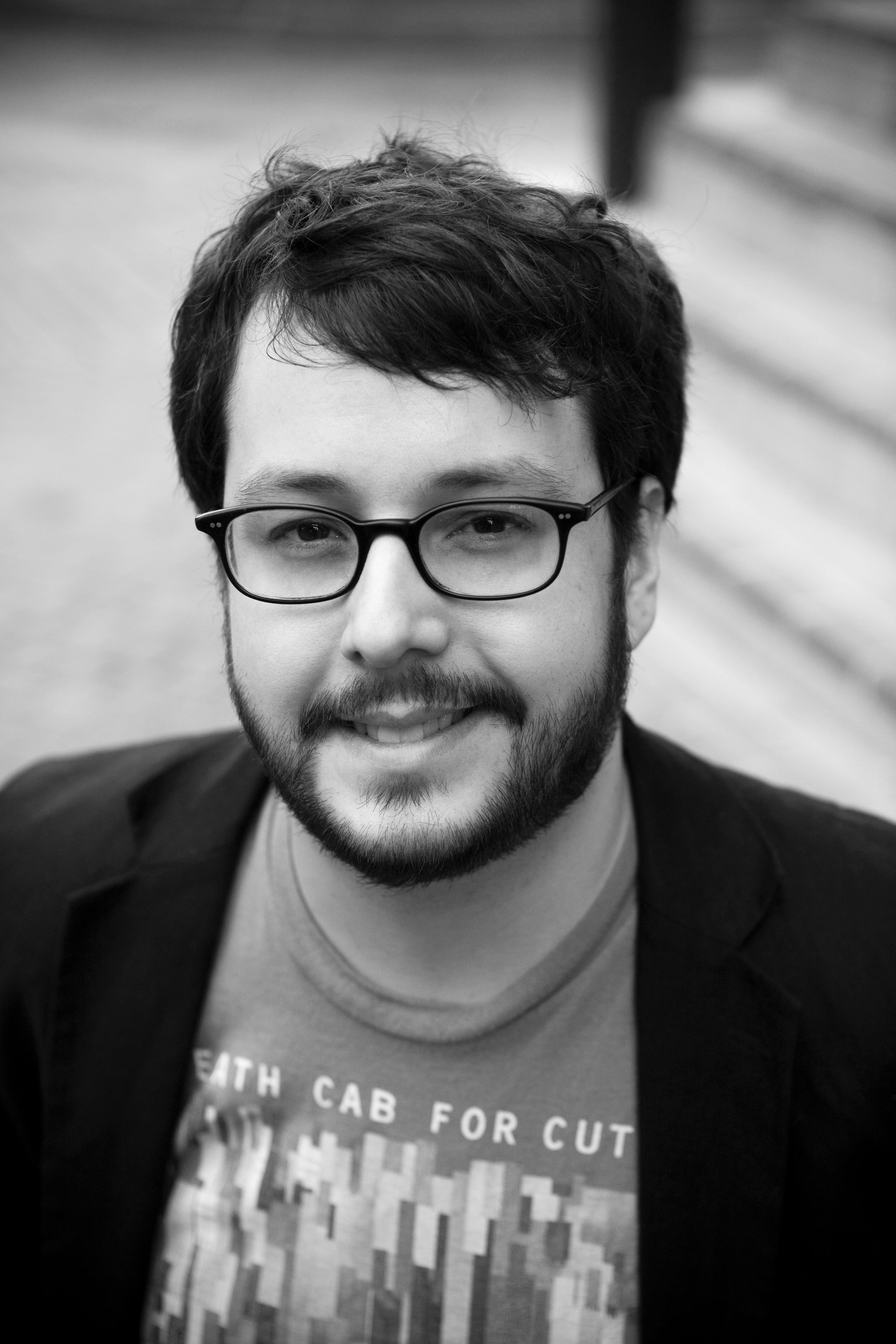
- Clements in 2009
- Born: Allen J. Clements; 1978 (age 47–48); Lafayette, Louisiana, US
- Known for: Emmy-nominated documentary filmmaker, biodynamic farmer
- Spouse: Kerry Clements

Allen J. Clements (born 1978) is an American filmmaker, content strategist, and biodynamic farmer. He is an Emmy-nominated director known for his work in documentary filmmaking and commercial production, with over 25 years in the film and video industry. Clements has directed documentary films and television commercials, including the Emmy-nominated PBS docuseries Dismantling Democracy.

Beyond his media career, Clements applies principles of biodynamic agriculture, permaculture, and ecological systems thinking to content marketing and brand strategy. He is a certified Biodynamic Practitioner and co-founder of Dark Hollow Biodynamic farm in Pennsylvania, where he applies regenerative agriculture principles. Clements is also known for his earlier work as a guitarist and vocalist in indie rock bands Claymore and Victim of Modern Age.

== Early life and education ==
Allen Clements was born and raised in Lafayette, Louisiana. His father was a commercial artist who served as art director for a local television station, influencing Clements' early interest in visual storytelling.

While attending the University of Louisiana at Lafayette, Clements worked in various media roles in television production and as a program producer for KRVS Radio Acadie, the NPR affiliate of the university. He formed the indie punk band Claymore with fellow students and later joined the band Victim of Modern Age as guitarist and vocalist. The band toured the East Coast and released the album Channels Like Capillaries (2004) on Universal Warning Records, performing with acts including Brand New, Hey Mercedes, and Mae.

Clements graduated in 2003 with a degree in Marketing and Business Administration, focusing on market research and business analytics.

== Music career ==
While attending college, Clements and three other students formed the indie punk band Claymore, with Clements handling both vocals and guitar. In September 2002 he was invited to join as a guitarist and vocalist with the Lafayette indie band Victim of Modern Age. The band and Clements toured the east coast performing. In 2003 they began recording their second album Channels Like Capillaries, which was released on Universal Warning Records. Clements and Bobby Nixon both provided vocals and guitar, and the album was a mixture of rock, pop, punk, and alternative. During its run the band performed with groups such as Benton Falls, Hey Mercedes, Liars Academy, Mae, Red Animal War, Jet By Day, Twothirtyeight, and Brand New.

After Victim of Modern Age disbanded in 2004, Clements was asked to join the Lancaster, Pennsylvania-based band Sadaharu. Clements set up residence in the new city. After leaving Sadaharu, Clements continued to occasionally perform his own solo material under the moniker "A. Premise."

== Film and media career ==
=== Early production work and Postage, Inc. ===
After graduating, Clements worked in various media production roles for film and video companies. After Victim of Modern Age disbanded in 2004, Clements relocated to Lancaster, Pennsylvania. In 2006, he founded the film and media production company that would become Postage, Inc. with partner Joseph Krzemienski. The company specialized in animation, visual effects, documentaries, and commercial production, serving clients including the National Sexual Violence Resource Center, Penske Corporation, and Universal Warning Records.

Both Clements and Krzemienski served as adjunct professors at Pennsylvania College of Art & Design, where they taught motion and video production.

=== Documentary and commercial work ===
In 2006, Clements began work on The Chameleon Club (2011), a documentary about Lancaster's historic music venue. The film uses archival footage, home movies, and interviews to chronicle the venue's cultural impact. A review in Lancaster Online praised Clements' work, noting that "his perspective as a musician gives the film its sense of authority" and that the documentary "succeeds in pointing out the source of the club's success." In 2013, Clements produced the animated short Atomic Robo: Last Stop, based on the graphic novel series.

=== MAKE Films and later work ===
In 2016, Clements joined MAKE Films as Senior Producer. During his tenure, he directed broadcast commercials and documentary films for major brands including The Hershey Company, Penn State, Cisco, Novo Nordisk, Armstrong Flooring, Tower Health, and Giant Food Stores.

His most prominent documentary work at MAKE Films was directing the Emmy-nominated PBS docuseries Dismantling Democracy, which he completed during the COVID-19 pandemic. The project, a collaboration with the University of Virginia's Center for Politics and Virginia Public Media, examined threats to democratic institutions in the United States and globally. The documentary was nominated by the National Capital Chesapeake Bay Chapter of the National Academy of Television Arts and Sciences in the category of "Documentary – Cultural | Topical."

== Biodynamic agriculture and natural philosophy ==
=== Training and philosophy ===
In 2019-2020, Clements completed certification as a Biodynamic Practitioner at the Pfeiffer Center in Spring Valley, New York, studying Rudolf Steiner's agricultural lectures and biodynamic preparation methods. His approach emphasizes building intuition for working with natural systems and elemental forces in farming.

Clements describes his work as integrating filmic storytelling with ecological systems thinking, connecting his understanding of narrative structure and regenerative agriculture. He has studied forest garden design with permaculture designer Dave Jacke and previously served on the board of the Horn Farm Center for agricultural education.

=== Dark Hollow Biodynamic ===
In 2022, Clements co-founded Dark Hollow Biodynamic (also known as Gnomewood Farm), a 13-acre agroforestry farmstead in Wrightsville, Pennsylvania. The farm specializes in applying biodynamic principles to agroforestry systems, cultivating non-timber forest products (NTFPs) and mushrooms. He previously operated The Forest Ranch, focusing on regenerative agriculture education and documentation.

Clements' work explores the intersection of anthroposophy (the spiritual philosophy underlying biodynamic agriculture), permaculture design, and content marketing, advocating for applying ecological systems thinking to business strategy and brand development.

=== Speaking and media appearances ===
Clements has been featured as a speaker and contributor on topics related to regenerative agriculture and biodynamics:

- Featured guest on The Permaculture Podcast (2020), discussing his training in biodynamic agriculture
- Co-host on the Goetheanum Agricultural Section Podcast, Episode #15: "Chances of Biodynamics and Agroforestry" (with Manfred Osterroth), discussing tropical biodynamics and agroforestry integration
- Speaker at the Heart & Soil Magazine Soil Summit conference series (2023, 2025), presenting on biodynamic farming practices
- Contributor to Heart & Soil Magazine on regenerative agriculture topics

== Other ventures ==
In 2012, Clements co-founded Second Fiction, LLC, a mobile game startup that released three titles: Atomic Robo: Violent Science, Codename Birdgame, and Blitz Bingo.

== Discography ==
- Call Before You Dig by Muon Nutrino (1998)
- Found Underneath by Claymore (2002)
- Channels Like Capillaries by Victim of Modern Age (2004)
