= Alexander J. Clements =

American politician

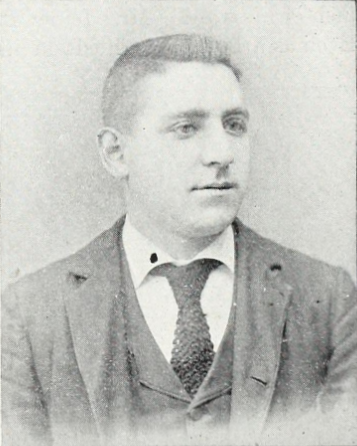
Clements in about 1895

Alexander J. Clements (c. 1866 − 4 December 1933) was a local politician in Hudson County, New Jersey. He gained notoriety for political corruption, especially graft, electoral fraud and cronyism.

== Life and political career ==
Alexander J. Clements was born on March 3, 1868. His father, A. J. Clements, was a lumber inspector for the Pennsylvania Railroad.

Clements attended Public School No. 3. When he left school he worked as a messenger boy, and then from 1885 as a carpenter for the Pennsylvania Railroad. He became a member of Hudson County's Democratic County Committee in 1893 and was elected as a Freeholder for the First Ward in 1896, after which he left the railroad and went into the "liquor business". (Note: At some point Clements became the owner of the Old Stone House, a saloon in Jersey City, which may be what "the liquor business" is referring to.) He was re-elected as Freeholder for the First Ward in 1898, and was a member of the Printing and Stationery Committee during that term. He did not run for Freeholder in the following election, but was elected again from the First Ward in 1902 and 1904. By 1905 he was the Democratic leader of the First Ward; he did not run for Freeholder that year, but supported a slate of candidates opposed to Otto Wittpenn. Almost all of Clements' candidates lost.

In 1913 Clements tried for one of the nominations for Jersey City commissioner, but was opposed by Frank Hague. He subsequently worked for the election of Wittpenn's candidates. In the primary elections that year, Clements was among several accused of election fraud, when his district in the First Ward returned 528 ballots, although they had only been given 500 ballots to use.

In December 1914 Clements was appointed the Superintendent of Bridges, a position created for him, at a salary of $3,000; a local paper also reported that he might be given an automobile as part of the appointment. The appointment was over the objections of the newly elected Supervisor, James O'Mealia. In February the following year the Civil Service Commission ruled that the position required the holder to pass an examination; Clements had argued that the position was that of a department head and exempt from the examination requirement. As a result he had to sit for an examination in which other applicants could also compete. The board allowed him to continue as Superintendent of Bridges until the examination, and he continued to draw the salary until he failed the examination later that year. Several other applicants passed the examination, which created an embarrassment for the Board of Freeholders as if they did not appoint one of the successful applicants, it would "amount to an admission on the part of the Freeholders that the job was unnecessary". The Jersey Observer and Jersey Journal reported that "Politicians about the Court House ... admitted that the place had been created for Clements because of his political activities on behalf of the present controlling county officials". Shortly after Clements lost the position of Superintendent of Bridges, he was appointed a Hudson County poultry inspector.

Clements was supervisor of roads in Hudson County, New Jersey, for twenty years before his death. He was first appointed to the position temporarily, in July 1916, at a salary of $1,800. He owned a saloon named the Old Stone House, at Newark Avenue and Grove Street. He made failed attempts to run for office, as Sheriff and as Councilman, both in Jersey City.

He died of a heart condition on 4 December 1933 at the Medical Center in Jersey City.

== Legal issues ==
Clements was twice arrested for assault: once in 1900 for a fight on one of the annual outings he organized, and once in 1908 for a fight outside a polling place during the election that year. In 1908 Francis Woods, a hotel owner in Schenectady, had Clements followed by detectives for a month, eventually finding evidence that Clements had met Woods' wife at a boarding house in New York. Clements was cited as co-respondent in the resulting divorce case. In 1918 Clements was sued for $500 for an unpaid check.

=== Hudson County courthouse ===
In 1911 he and thirteen other men were indicted for fraud in connection with contracting bids for the building of the courthouse in Jersey City, for which the budget was $3,500,000. Clements was the president of the court house committee at the time of the indictment. The indictment was nolled in 1913.

== Sources ==
- Lee, Francis Bazley (1895). History of Trenton, New Jersey. Trenton, New Jersey: J. L. Murphy. OCLC 235782376.
