= Nathaniel Clements, 2nd Earl of Leitrim =

British politician

The Right Honourable The Earl of Leitrim KP PC (Ire)

Lord Lieutenant of Leitrim
- In office 1831–1854
- Preceded by: New constituency
- Succeeded by: Edward King Tenison

Member of Parliament for County Leitrim
- In office 1801–1804 Serving with Theophilus Jones, Peter La Touche II
- Preceded by: New constituency
- Succeeded by: Peter La Touche II; Henry John Clements

Personal details
- Born: Nathaniel Clements; 9 May 1768 Dublin, Ireland
- Died: 31 December 1854 (aged 86)
- Party: Whig
- Spouse: Mary Bermingham (m. 1800; died 1840)
- Relations: John Townshend, 1st Earl Sydney (nephew)
- Children: 8
- Parent(s): Robert Clements, 1st Earl of Leitrim; Lady Elizabeth Skeffington
- Education: Oriel College, Oxford

Nathaniel Clements, 2nd Earl of Leitrim, KP PC (Ire) (9 May 1768 – 31 December 1854), styled The Honourable from 1783 to 1795, and then Viscount Clements to 1804, was an Irish nobleman and politician.

== Early life ==
Clements was born in Dublin on 9 May 1768. He was the eldest son of Robert Clements, 1st Earl of Leitrim and the former Lady Elizabeth Skeffington. His younger brother was Lt.-Col. Hon. Robert Clotworthy Clements (who died unmarried in 1828); his sisters were Lady Elizabeth Clements, Lady Louisa Clements, and Lady Caroline Elizabeth Letitia Clements (the second wife of John Townshend, 2nd Viscount Sydney). His paternal grandparents were the Rt. Hon. Nathaniel Clements and the former Hannah Gore (a daughter of the Very Rev. William Gore, Dean of Down). His mother was the eldest daughter of Clotworthy Skeffington, 1st Earl of Massereene.

He was educated at a private school in Portarlington and Oriel College, Oxford, graduating in 1788. Two years later he was elected to the Irish House of Commons as Whig member for Roscommon as well as Carrick, but chose to sit for the latter. In 1798, as Viscount Clements, he was returned for both Cavan Borough and County Leitrim. He represented the latter constituency until the Act of Union in 1801, and was then elected for County Leitrim at Westminster until 1804.

== Career ==
He was appointed Custos Rotulorum of Leitrim in 1795 and Custos Rotulorum of Donegal in 1804. Having served as High Sheriff of Leitrim in 1796, Clements became Colonel of the Prince of Wales's Own Donegal Militia on 22 June 1796, and retained the command even after its disembodiment in 1816. In 1798 he succeeded his father as 2nd Earl of Leitrim, but subsequently failed in his attempts to be elected to the House of Lords as an Irish representative peer. In 1831, as well as becoming Lord Lieutenant of Leitrim for life, Lord Leitrim was created Baron Clements in the Peerage of the United Kingdom.

Three years later he was appointed a Knight of the Order of St Patrick, and later that year he became a member of the Irish Privy Council.

== Personal life ==
On 24 July 1800, he was married to Mary Bermingham (d. 1840), eldest daughter and co-heiress of William Bermingham of Ross Hill and Mary (née Ruttledge) Bermingham (eldest daughter and co-heiress of Thomas Ruttledge). Together, they were the parents of:

- Lady Maria Clements (1802–1885), who married the Rev. Hon. Edward Southwell Keppel (1800–1883), Clerk of the Closet and Rector of Quidenham who was the fourth son of William Keppel, 4th Earl of Albemarle and the Hon. Elizabeth Southwell (second daughter of Edward Southwell, 20th Baron de Clifford) in 1828.
- Lady Elizabeth Victoria Clements (1803–1892), who died unmarried.
- Robert Bermingham Clements, styled Viscount Clements (1805–1839), a Whig Member of Parliament for County Leitrim from 1826 to 1830 and from 1832 until his death in 1839.
- William Sydney Clements, 3rd Earl of Leitrim (1806–1878).
- Hon. Charles Skeffington Clements (1807–1877), MP for Leitrim from 1847 to 1852.
- Hon. George Robert Anson Clements (1810–1837), who served in the Royal Navy.
- Hon. Francis Nathaniel Clements (1812–1870), a reverend who served as Vicar of Norton and Canon of Durham; he married Charlotte King, daughter of Rev. Gilbert King; after her death, he married Amelia Verner, eldest daughter of Sir William Verner, 1st Baronet.
- Lady Caroline Clements (d. 1869), who married John Ynyr Burges of Parkanaur House in 1833.

Lady Leitrim died on 5 February 1840. Lord Leitrim died in 1854 aged 86 at his residence of Killadoon in County Kildare. His eldest son having predeceased him in 1839, he was succeeded in the earldom by his younger son, William Sydney Clements.

Parliament of Ireland
Preceded by Maurice Copinger; George Sandford	Member of Parliament for Roscommon; 1790–1791; With: George Sandford	Succeeded by Henry Moore Sandford; George Sandford
Preceded by Edward King; Hon. Thomas Pelham	Member of Parliament for Carrick; 1790–1797; With: Edward King 1790–1793; Nathaniel Sneyd 1794–1797	Succeeded by Nathaniel Sneyd; William Gore
Preceded by Peter La Touche; Theophilus Jones	Member of Parliament for County Leitrim; 1798–1801; With: Theophilus Jones	Succeeded by Parliament of the United Kingdom
Preceded by Thomas Nesbitt; Lord Charles James FitzGerald	Member of Parliament for Cavan Borough; 1798; With: Thomas Nesbitt	Succeeded by Thomas Nesbitt; George Cavendish
Parliament of the United Kingdom
New constituency	Member of Parliament for County Leitrim; 1801–1804; With: Theophilus Jones 1801–1802; Peter La Touche II 1802–1804	Succeeded by Peter La Touche II; Henry John Clements
Honorary titles
New title	Lord Lieutenant of Leitrim; 1831–1854	Succeeded by Edward King Tenison
Peerage of Ireland
Preceded by Robert Clements	Earl of Leitrim; 1804–1854	Succeeded by William Clements
Peerage of the United Kingdom
New creation	Baron Clements; 1831–1854	Succeeded by William Clements
