= Peter La Touche =

Peter La Touche may refer to:

- Peter La Touche (1733–1828), Irish politician, MP for County Leitrim 1783–90 and 1796–98
- Peter La Touche (died 1830), Irish politician, MP for Leitrim 1802–06, nephew of the earlier MP of the same name
