= 1876 County Leitrim by-election =

UK Parliamentary by-election

The 1876 County Leitrim by-election was fought on 14 July 1876. The by-election was fought due to the succession to a peerage of the incumbent Conservative MP, William Ormsby-Gore. It was won by the Home Rule candidate Francis O'Beirne.

By-election, 14 July 1876: Leitrim (1 seat)
Party	Candidate	Votes	%	±%
Home Rule	Francis O'Beirne	1,276	58.9	−9.4
Conservative	Arthur Loftus Tottenham	885	40.8	+9.1
Home Rule	Charles McGowan	7	0.3	N/A
Majority		391	18.1	N/A
Turnout		2,168	85.4	−3.4
Registered electors		2,383		
Home Rule gain from Conservative		Swing	+9.3	
