= William Clements, 3rd Earl of Leitrim =

Anglo-Irish nobleman, soldier, politician and landlord

The Right Honourable The Earl of Leitrim JP
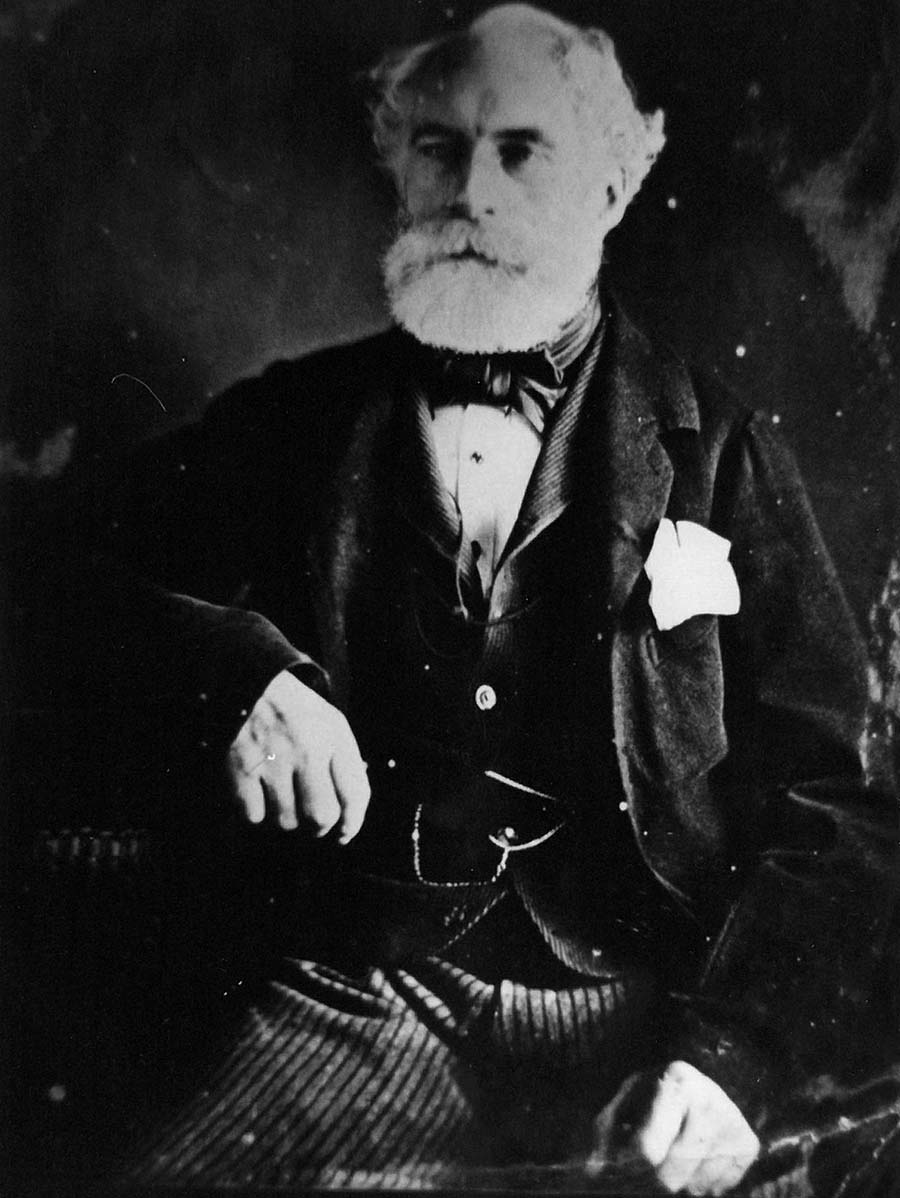

Member of Parliament for County Leitrim
- In office 1839–1847 Serving with Samuel White
- Preceded by: Viscount Clements; Samuel White
- Succeeded by: Edward King-Tenison; Charles Clements

Personal details
- Born: William Sydney Clements; 15 October 1806 Dublin, Ireland
- Died: 2 July 1878 (aged 71) County Donegal, Ireland
- Cause of death: Assassination by gunshot
- Parent(s): The 2nd Earl of Leitrim
- Education: Royal Military College, Sandhurst

Military service
- Branch/service: British Army
- Rank: Lieutenant-Colonel

William Sydney Clements, 3rd Earl of Leitrim (15 October 1806 – 2 April 1878), was an Anglo-Irish nobleman and landlord notorious in Irish history for his mistreatment of his tenants. He was assassinated in the north of County Donegal in Ireland in April 1878.

== Early life ==
William Sydney Clements was born in Dublin on 15 October 1806. He was the second son of the 2nd Earl of Leitrim and the former Mary Bermingham (1840). Aside from his elder brother, he had three younger brothers, including Capt. Hon. Charles Skeffington Clements, MP for Leitrim, the Hon. George Robert Anson Clements of the Royal Navy, and the Rev. Hon. Francis Nathaniel Clements, Vicar of Norton and Canon of Durham (who first married Charlotte King, daughter of Rev. Gilbert King, and, after her death, Amelia Verner, eldest daughter of Sir William Verner, 1st Baronet). He also had three sisters, Lady Maria Clements (wife of the Rev. Hon. Edward Southwell Keppel, fourth son of the 4th Earl of Albemarle), Lady Elizabeth Victoria Clements, and Lady Caroline Clements (wife of John Ynyr Burges of Parkanaur House).

His paternal grandparents were the 1st Earl of Leitrim (son and heir of the Rt. Hon. Nathaniel Clements and the former Hannah Gore, a daughter of the Very Rev. William Gore, Dean of Down) and the former Lady Elizabeth Skeffington (eldest daughter of the 1st Earl of Massereene). His mother was the eldest daughter and co-heiress of William Bermingham of Ross Hill and Mary (née Ruttledge) Bermingham (eldest daughter and co-heiress of Thomas Ruttledge).

After receiving an education at Sandhurst, he was commissioned as an ensign in the 43rd Foot in 1824. In 1831, he was promoted captain, having served in Portugal between 1826 and 1827, and that same year was appointed an aide-de-camp to the Lord Lieutenant of Ireland. In 1835, he transferred to the 51st Foot. In 1839, on the death of his elder brother, he became known as Viscount Clements and also succeeded his brother as a Member of Parliament for County Leitrim, a seat he held until 1847.

== Career ==
On his father's death in December 1854, Clements succeeded as the 3rd Earl of Leitrim. In 1855, he was promoted lieutenant-colonel and subsequently retired from the British Army. Over the next two decades, his overbearing behaviour as a landlord brought him much hatred from his tenants, Catholic and Protestant alike, whom he evicted with equal enthusiasm. According to his biographer Fiona Slevin, Lord Leitrim was accused by some of "repeatedly [violating] young girls and [claiming] droit du seigneur ... some of his peers repeated accusations of his 'immorality towards daughters of tenants' in the House of Commons and named him 'the bad earl'." However, Slevin also quotes a journalist who investigated Lord Leitrim's assassination as claiming, "'even among those who hold the strongest views upon Lord Leitrim's conduct as a landlord, the charge (of debauchery) is discredited and I did not meet a single person who regarded it as tenable.'" In Slevin's words, "the final straw that motivated the individuals involved" in Lord Leitrim's assassination was his alleged rape of the daughter of one of his assassins.

Leitrim was deeply opposed to Gladstone's Landlord and Tenant (Ireland) Act 1870 and was one of eight peers to protest against the legislation when it reached the House of Lords. Among those he also quarrelled with were the Presbyterian minister of Milford in North Donegal, and the Lord Lieutenant himself, The 7th Earl of Carlisle, who removed him from his appointments as a justice of the peace for Counties Leitrim, Donegal, and Galway.

== Death ==
In April 1878, after surviving various attempts on his life, Lord Leitrim was shot dead, along with his clerk and driver, near Cratlagh Wood while on his way to Milford (a village he owned in its entirety) from his home, Manor Vaughan (usually known as Mulroy House), on the shores of Mulroy Bay. Michael Heraghty and brothers Thomas and Bernard McGranahan were arrested. "The gun butt had been traced to Heraghty, and paper for the wadding used to load the rifle was traced to a school copybook owned by the McGranahans. The McGranahans were released from Lifford Jail due to a lack of evidence. Heraghty died in Lifford Jail of typhus... The assassins, Nial Shiels of Doughmore, an itinerant tailor, Michael Hergarty of Tullyconnell, and Michael McElwee of Ballyworiskey, were from the remote Fanad Peninsula. In 1877, "McElwee's father was involved in litigation with Leitrim with the result that McElwee was rendered bankrupt, and his house and farm were sold at auction."

Leitrim was buried in Dublin at St. Michan's Church, amid scenes of great agitation. "The mob wanted to wreak their drunken rage on the dead body of the old Earl, as it was not enough that he had been murdered; and when they were disappointed in their charitable desire to throw the corpse into the street, they howled and yelled an accompaniment of brutal hate to the funeral service. It was a disgraceful affair, scarcely possible in any other latitude of the civilized world."

A monument with a cross was set up at Kindrum in 1960 honoring McElwee, Shiels, and Michael Heraghty as the men whose actions "Ended the tyranny of landlordism".

== In popular culture ==
The murder forms a major element in the plot of the 2005 play The Home Place by Brian Friel.

Mick Blake wrote a song about Lord Leitrim - Leitrim (a brief history).

Parliament of the United Kingdom
Preceded by Robert Clements, Viscount Clements; Samuel White	Member of Parliament for County Leitrim; 1839 – 1847; With: Samuel White	Succeeded by Edward King-Tenison; Charles Clements
Peerage of Ireland
Preceded by Nathaniel Clements	Earl of Leitrim; 1854 – 1878	Succeeded by Robert Clements
