= Arthur Archer =

Arthur Archer may refer to:

- Arthur Archer (footballer) (1874–1940), English footballer
- Arthur Archer (rugby union) (1856—1930), Irish international rugby union player
- Arthur Edmund Archer (1871–1938), Australian rules footballer
