= Robert Clements, 4th Earl of Leitrim =

The Right Honourable The Earl of Leitrim DL

Personal details
- Born: Robert Bermingham Clements; 5 March 1847
- Died: 5 April 1892 (aged 45)
- Spouse: Lady Winifred Coke (m. 1873)
- Relations: William Clements, 3rd Earl of Leitrim (uncle); Nathaniel Clements, 2nd Earl of Leitrim (grandfather)
- Children: 8
- Parent(s): Francis Nathaniel Clements; Charlotte King Clements

Robert Bermingham Clements, 4th Earl of Leitrim DL (5 March 1847 – 5 April 1892) was an Irish soldier and nobleman.

== Early life ==
Clements was born on 5 March 1847. He was the only son of the Rev. Hon. Francis Nathaniel Clements, Vicar of Norton and Canon of Durham (1812–1870) and the former Charlotte King (a daughter of the Rev. Gilbert King of Langfield). He had six sisters, Lady Anne Clements (wife of Henry Augustus Murray and the Rev. George Peloquin Graham Cosserat), Lady Caroline Clements (wife of John Madden of Hilton Park in Clones, County Monaghan), Lady Elizabeth Emily Clements (wife of Henry Andrew Harper), Lady Louisa Frances Clements (wife of George Hans Hamilton, Archdeacon of Northumberland), Lady Selina Charlotte Clements (wife of Dr. George Ernest Lyndon of Clonnegonnel House), and Lady Mary Clements (wife of Llewellyn Lloyd-Mostyn, 3rd Baron Mostyn). After his mother's death, his father remarried to Amelia Verner, the eldest daughter of Sir William Verner, 1st Baronet, in 1870.

== Career ==
He served in the Royal Navy, gaining the rank of Lieutenant. He held the office of Deputy Lieutenant.

When his unmarried uncle, William Clements, 3rd Earl of Leitrim was murdered on 2 April 1878, he succeeded as the 3rd Baron Clements of Kilmacrenan, the 4th Viscount Leitrim, the 4th Earl of Leitrim, the 4th Baron Leitrim, of Manor Hamilton. His uncle, however, left as much as he could away from him and, instead, chose as his principal heir his Ashfield second cousin, the next Colonel H. T. Clements. Lord Leitrim had a long dispute with Trinity College Dublin, over the headrents of part of his Donegal estates. His heirs sold the Newtowngore estate in the 1930s.

== Personal life ==
On 2 September 1873, he was married to Lady Winifred Coke (1851–1940), the fifth daughter of Thomas Coke, 2nd Earl of Leicester and, his first wife, the former Juliana Whitbread (eldest daughter of Samuel Charles Whitbread of Cardington Park, MP for Middlesex). Together, they were the parents of eight children, three sons and five daughters, including:

- Lady Winifred Edith Clements (c. 1875 – 1966), who married Arthur Henry Renshaw of Watlington Park (1851–1912) brother of Sir Charles Renshaw, 1st Baronet, and fourth son of Thomas Charles Renshaw QC, in 1899.
- Lady Mary Hilda Clements (1875–1919), who married, as his first wife, Robert Strutt, 4th Baron Rayleigh, in 1905.
- Charles Clements, 5th Earl of Leitrim (1879–1952)
- Lady Maude Clements (1877–1932), who married Maj. Henry Wyndham Vivian (1868–1901), eldest son and heir of Brig.-Gen. Sir Arthur Vivian and Lady Augusta Wyndham-Quin (eldest surviving daughter of Edwin Wyndham-Quin, 3rd Earl of Dunraven and Mount-Earl), in 1899. After his death in 1901, she married Christopher Foulis Roundell (1876–1959) of Dorfold Hall, only child of Charles Savile Roundell MP and Julia Tollemache (eldest daughter of Wilbraham Tollemache), in 1910.
- Lady Lily Clements (1882–1882), who died in infancy.
- Hon. Francis Patrick Clements (1885–1917), a Royal Navy officer who went to America under an assumed name, disappeared, and was pronounced dead in 1917.
- Lady Kathleen Clements (1888–1975), who married Lt. Granville Keith-Falconer Smith (1886–1914), eldest son and heir apparent of Col. Granville Roland Francis Smith CVO CB, of Duffield Hall and Lady Blanche Keith-Falconer (second daughter of Francis Keith-Falconer, 8th Earl of Kintore), in 1910. After his death in 1914, she married Cmdr. Ronald Granville Studd, a son of the Lord Mayor of London Sir Kynaston Studd, 1st Baronet, in 1919.
- Hon. Robert Clements (1888–1890), who died in childhood.

Lord Leitrim died 5 April 1892 and was buried at Carrigart near Mulroy in County Donegal. His widow lived another forty-eight years before her death on 22 March 1940.

Peerage of Ireland
Preceded by William Clements	Earl of Leitrim; 1878–1892	Charles Clements
