= Edward King-Tenison =

Irish politician and photographer (1805–1878)

Edward King Tenison

Member of Parliament for County Leitrim
- In office 12 August 1847 – 26 July 1852 Serving with Charles Skeffington Clements
- Preceded by: Samuel White; William Clements
- Succeeded by: Hugh Lyons-Montgomery; John Brady

Personal details
- Born: 21 January 1805 Kilronan Castle, Ballyfarnon, County Roscommon, Ireland
- Died: 19 June 1878 (aged 73) Kilronan Castle, Ballyfarnon, County Roscommon, Ireland
- Party: Whig
- Other political affiliations: Liberal
- Spouse: Lady Louisa Anson (m. 1838)
- Parent(s): Thomas Tenison; Lady Frances King
- Education: Trinity College, Cambridge; Eton College

Edward King Tenison (21 January 1805 – 19 June 1878) was an Irish Whig and Liberal politician and photographer.

== Early life and family ==
Born in 1805 at Kilronan Castle, King Tenison was the son of Thomas Tenison and Lady Frances King. He was also the grandson of Edward King, 1st Earl of Kingston, and cousin of Robert King, 6th Earl of Kingston. He was educated at Eton College and Trinity College, Cambridge where he achieved an MA before, in 1825, joining the army and serving as an officer of the 14th Light Dragoons until 1836.

Having retired from the army, he then served as a Justice of the Peace and High Sheriff for County Leitrim, County Roscommon and County Sligo, and later became a Lord Lieutenant for Roscommon and Sligo.

In 1838, he married travel writer and artist Lady Louisa Anson, daughter of Thomas Anson, 1st Earl of Lichfield and Louisa Catherine Philips. Together, they had two children: Louisa Frances Mary (died 1868) and Florence Margaret Christine Tenison (1845–1907).

== Photography ==
In the 1840s, he took up photography, beginning with daguerreotypes and paper negatives, after receiving a licence granted by former Chippenham MP William Henry Fox Talbot.

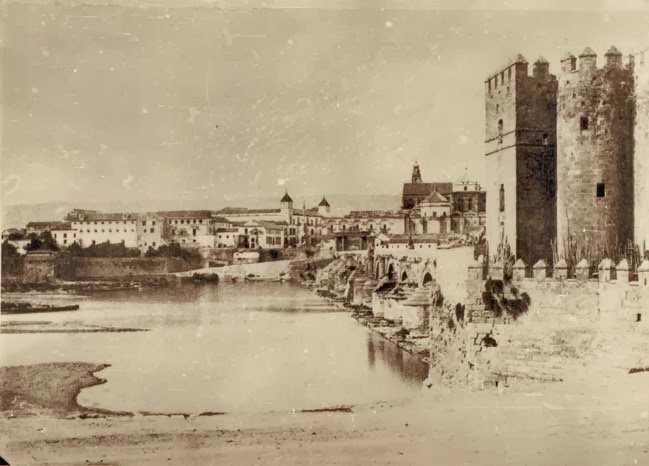
King Tenison's photo of Córdoba in Spain, taken in 1852

Between 1850 and 1852, King Tenison and his wife travelled in Spain for their artwork where, as an early adopter of the calotype photographic process, he aroused suspicion and curiosity due to his bulky equipment and outdoor work. The work was later published as Memories of Spain in 1854, while his wife's 50 lithographs appeared in Castile and Anadalucia in 1853.

In 1853, he joined the Photographic Society of London, and first displayed his work at the Great Industrial Exhibition in Dublin. The next year, he then helped to found the Dublin Photographic Society.

Further works of his were later put on display in London between 1854 and 1855, encompassing photos taken using calotype and waxed paper processes in Spain, Belgium and Normandy. He then travelled to Algeria, before concluding his career taking photos in his home nation of Ireland.

An album of his work, calotypes and salt print photos of Ireland taken in 1858, is now preserved in the National Photographic Archive in Dublin, while further work is held in private collections. In 1999, one album was sold at Christie's for more than $10,000.

== Political career ==
King Tenison first stood for election in 1830 at County Roscommon but was unsuccessful. He was later elected MP for County Leitrim in 1847 – standing on civil and religious liberty, opposing anti-Catholic measures – but stood down at the next general election in 1852. King Tenison sought to be MP for the seat again in 1857 as well as in 1859 for Roscommon, but was both times unsuccessful. He also stood at a by-election in Sligo in 1860, but retired from the race after refusing to offer bribes to Liberal electors. His final attempt for parliament in 1865, at Leitrim, was also unsuccessful.

== Death ==
King Tenison died at Kilronan Castle in June 1878, while his wife died at Trieste, Italy in September 1882.

Parliament of the United Kingdom
Preceded by Samuel White; William Clements	Member of Parliament for County Leitrim; 1847 – 1852; With: Charles Skeffington Clements	Succeeded by Hugh Lyons-Montgomery; John Brady
