= Hugh Lyons-Montgomery =

Irish Conservative Party politician (1816–1882)

Member of Parliament for County Leitrim
- In office 26 July 1852 – 17 April 1858 Serving with John Brady
- Preceded by: Edward King-Tenison; Charles Skeffington Clements
- Succeeded by: William Ormsby-Gore; John Brady

Personal details
- Born: 1816
- Died: 16 July 1882 (aged 65–66)
- Party: Conservative

Hugh Lyons-Montgomery (1816 – 16 July 1882) was an Irish Conservative Party politician.

Baptised on 31 March 1816, Lyons-Montgomery was the son of Hugh Lyons-Montgomery and Eliza Blacker. In 1840, he married Elizabeth Smith, daughter of Henry Smith, and they had 14 children: Florence Maud; Eveline Clemina (died 1928); Ada Louisa Mary; Henrietta Emily Anne; Alfred Otho; Hugh; Norma Wilhelmina (died 1876); Ethel Constance; Beatrice Cicely Blanche; Elizabeth Sophia (1841–1918); Caroline Matilda (1842–1877); Henry Willoughby Stewart (born 1850); Lambert de Winton (1853–1939); and Kyneston Forster Walter (born 1859).

In 1840, Lyons-Montgomery became High Sheriff of County Leitrim before being elected as Member of Parliament (MP) for County Leitrim at the 1852 general election and held the seat until 1858 when he resigned by accepting the office of Steward of the Manor of Hempholme.

Lyons-Montgomery was also a Deputy Lieutenant and a Justice of the Peace of County Leitrim.

Parliament of the United Kingdom
Preceded by Edward King-Tenison; Charles Skeffington Clements	Member of Parliament for County Leitrim; 1852–1858; With: John Brady	Succeeded by John Brady; William Ormsby-Gore
