= Lady Louisa Tenison =

English artist, traveller and author (1819–1882)

Lady Louisa Mary Anne King-Tenison (née Anson; 6 December 1819 – 27 August 1882) was an English artist, traveler and author.

== Biography ==
Lady Louisa Anson was born at Shugborough Hall, the eldest of eight children of Viscount Anson (created Earl of Lichfield in 1831) and his wife, Louisa Catherine Philips.

She married Lt. Col Edward King-Tenison, grandson of the Earl of Kingston, on 26 November 1838. They had two daughters, Louisa Frances Mary and Florence Margaret Christina. Her husband was an MP and in the 1840s became intensely interested in the emerging practice of photography.

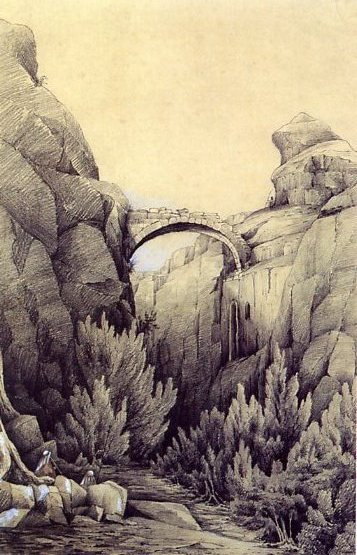
Drawing of the entrance to Petra by Lady Louisa Tenison

She and her husband traveled through Egypt, Palestine, and Syria in 1843, which led her to create a series of drawings of sites such as Karnak, Petra and the Church of the Holy Sepulchre, later published in her book Sketches in the East. Several years later, she documented their tour of Spain in her work Castile and Andalucia, which she wrote and also co-illustrated along with painter Egron Lundgren. She also assisted James Uwins (nephew of Thomas Uwins RA) with his drawings of the city of Granada, which were the source for paintings by Robert Burford exhibited at the Leicester Square Panorama in 1853.

She lived with her husband at Kilronan Castle, County Roscommon, a family estate which she and her husband significantly enlarged in the 1870s. She took an active role in the building works, notably dismissing the builder Sir Thomas Newenham Deane after a disagreement over cost overruns. She died in Trieste on 27 August 1882.

== In art and literature ==
Her portrait by John Phillip is part of the collection of the Royal Scottish Academy of Art & Architecture.

A book entitled The Book of Fenagh or of St. Caillin was dedicated to her, recognising her commitment both to "the land of her adoption" as well as her knowledge of the Irish language. She and her husband supported the translation of the book and also supplied early photographs of Fenagh.

One of her watercolour paintings featured in Sketches in the East, depicting the House of the British consul in Damascus, resides in the UK government art collection. In the book, she describes this room as being "one of the most splendid in Damascus."

== Sources ==
- The Book of Fenagh (PDF). Dublin: Alexander Thom. 1875.
- Burke's Peerage, Baronetage and Knightage (107th ed.). Stokesley: Burke's Peerage & Gentry. 2003. ISBN 9780971196629.
- Cockayne, George E. (2000). The Complete Peerage of England, Scotland, Ireland, Great Britain and the United Kingdom, Extant, Extinct, or Dormant. Gloucester: Alan Sutton Publishing.
- Description of a View of the City of Granada, With the Celebrated Fortress and Palace of the Alhambra, and the Surrounding Beautiful Vega, or Plain. London: R. Burford. 1853.
- Tenison, Louisa (1853). Castile and Andalucia. London: R. Bentley.
- Tenison, Louisa (1846). Sketches in the East by Lady Louisa Tenison. Drawn on Stone by Dickinson & Son. [Comprising Views in Egypt, Arabia, Petra & Syria]. London.
