= Luke White (died 1824) =

Irish politician

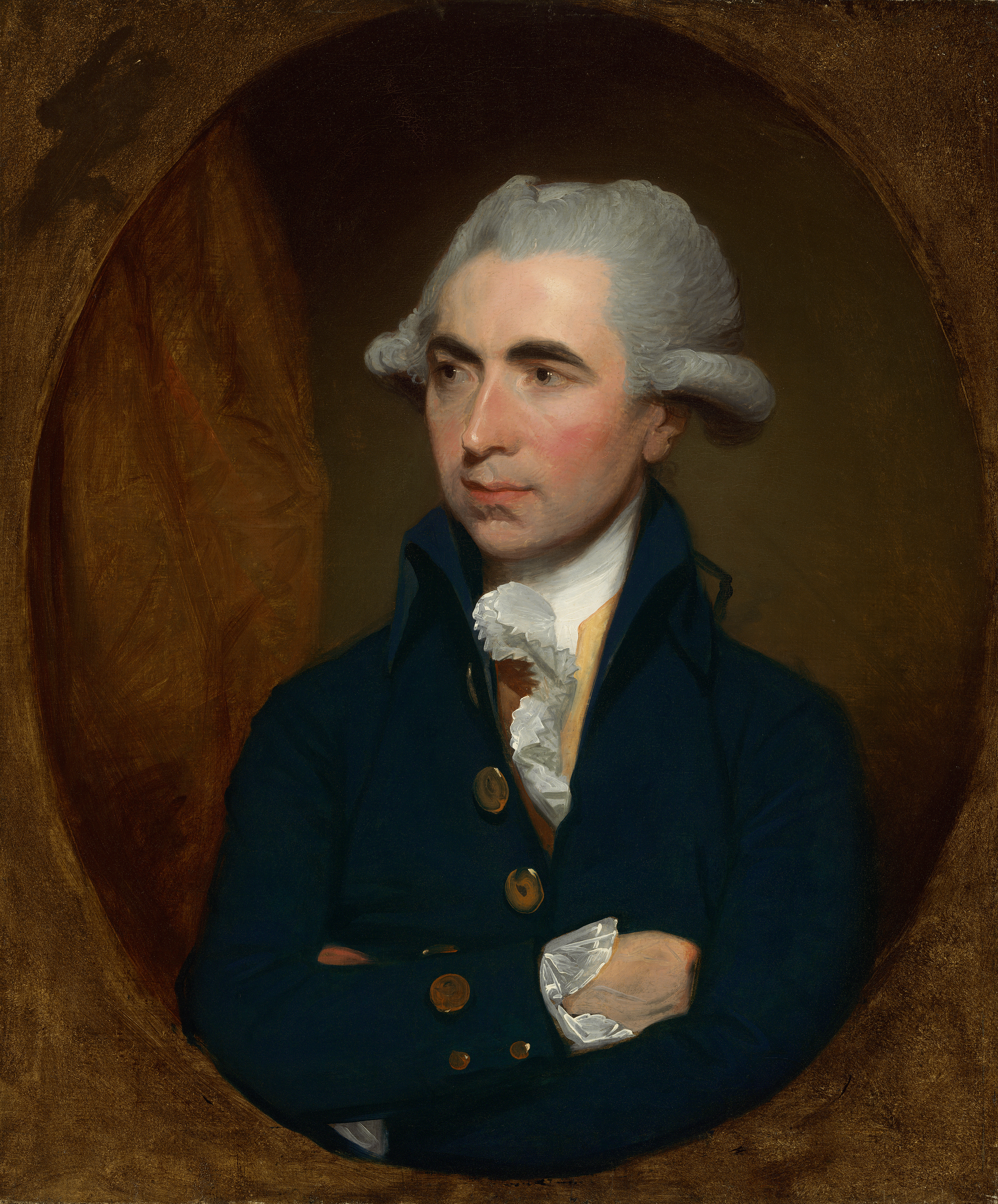
- portrait by Gilbert Stuart
- Born: c. 1740 or 1750
- Died: 25 February 1824
- Occupation: Politician
- Spouse(s): Elizabeth de la Mazière, Arabella Fortescue
- Children: 8, including Samuel, Luke Jr. and Henry

Luke White (circa 1740 or 1750 – 25 February 1824) was an Irish bookseller, operator of a lottery and Whig politician.

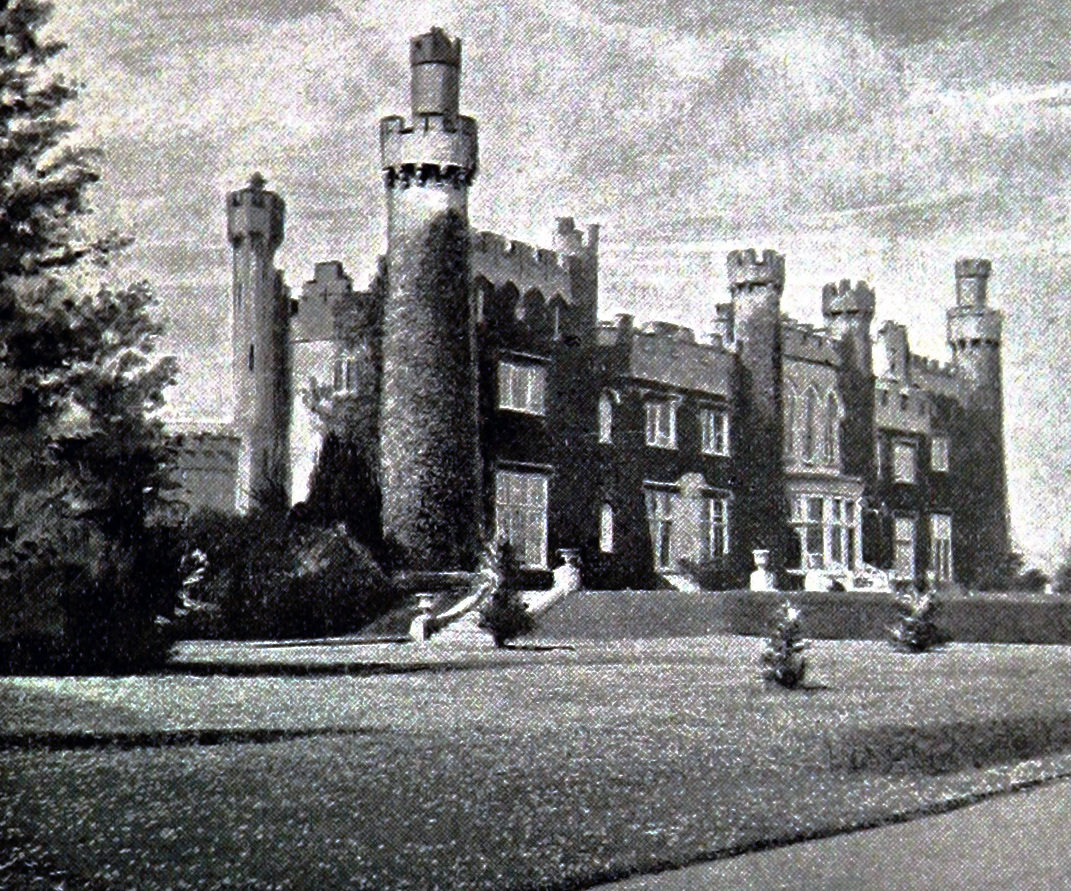
Luttrellstown Castle

He started as an impecunious book dealer, first in the streets of Belfast, then from 1778 at an auction house in Dublin buying and reselling around the country. By 1798, during the Irish Rebellion, he helped the Irish government with a loan of 1 million pounds (at £65 per £100 share at 5%).

He then purchased Luttrellstown Castle from Henry Luttrell, 2nd Earl of Carhampton in 1800, and changed its name to Woodlands to eradicate the memory of its previous owner. White was High Sheriff of County Dublin for 1804 and High Sheriff of Longford for 1806. He entered the British House of Commons for County Leitrim in 1818 and sat as Member of Parliament (MP) for it until his death in 1824.

On 7 February 1781, he married Elizabeth de la Mazière, by whom he had four sons and three daughters. He later married secondly, in 1800, Arabella Fortescue, daughter of William Fortescue, and had by her one son. White died in Park Street, Mayfair. He left properties worth £175,000 per annum which eventually devolved to his fourth son Henry, who was elevated to the Peerage of the United Kingdom as Baron Annaly. His second son Samuel represented the same constituency as his father and his third son, Luke White Jr., was MP for County Longford.

== Titles published by L. White ==
- Charles Vallancey (1786), Collectanea de rebus hibernicis .., L. White, OCLC 21739910, OL 23548813M
- Johann Reinhold Forster (1786), History of the voyages and discoveries made in the North, Dublin: Printed for Luke White ... and Pat. Byrne ..., ISBN 0665351720, OL 24354926M, 0665351720
- Bennett Mrs (1786), Anna; or, Memoirs of a Welch heiress, Dublin: White, OL 24830685M
- Charles Vallancey (1786), A Vindication of the Ancient History of Ireland: Wherein is Shewn, I. The Descent of Its Old .., for Luke White, no. 86, Dame – Street, OCLC 2368408, OL 20465641M
- Savary M. (1787), Lettres sur l'Égypte, Dublin: Printed for Luke White ... and P. Byrne ..., OCLC 11231343, OL 17862990M
- William Cullen (1789), A treatise of the materia medica, Dublin: Printed for Luke White, OCLC 14836745, OL 24972327M
- Bryan Edwards (1793), The history, civil and commercial, of the British colonies in the West Indies, Dublin: Luke White, ISBN 0665444591, OL 24614577M, 0665444591
- P. Cornelius Tacitus (1794), The works of Cornelius Tacitus, Dublin: Luke White, OL 23361664M

Parliament of the United Kingdom
Preceded by John Latouche; Henry John Clements	Member of Parliament for County Leitrim; 1812–1824; With: John Latouche 1812–1820; John Marcus Clements 1820–1824	Succeeded by John Marcus Clements; Samuel White
