= High Sheriff of Leitrim =

Britain's representative in County Leitrim, Ireland

The High Sheriff of Leitrim was the British Crown's judicial representative in County Leitrim, Ireland from c.1582 until 1922, when the office was abolished in the new Free State and replaced by the office of Leitrim County Sheriff. The sheriff had judicial, electoral, ceremonial and administrative functions and executed High Court Writs. In 1908, an Order in Council made the Lord-Lieutenant the Sovereign's prime representative in a county and reduced the High Sheriff's precedence. However the sheriff retained his responsibilities for the preservation of law and order in the county. The usual procedure for appointing the sheriff from 1660 onwards was that three persons were nominated at the beginning of each year from the county and the Lord Lieutenant then appointed his choice as High Sheriff for the remainder of the year. Often the other nominees were appointed as under-sheriffs. Sometimes a sheriff did not fulfil his entire term through death or other event and another sheriff was then appointed for the remainder of the year. The dates given hereunder are the dates of appointment. All addresses are in County Leitrim unless stated otherwise.

County Leitrim was created in 1569

== High Sheriffs of County Leitrim ==
- 1582: O'Rourke (Annals of Loch Cé 1582- Another depredation was committed by the sheriff O'Ruairc, and by the Saxons along with him, upon the sons of Mac Tighernain of the Breifne, at Loch-Roda; and their women were borne off captives from them)
- 1605: Sir Ralph Sidley
- 1606: Cola O'Kelly
- 1609: William Farrell
- 1613: John Reynolds of Loughscur Castle
- 1620: Humphrey Reynolds of Loughscur Castle
- 1621: Humphrey Reynolds of Loughscur Castle
- 1623: Humphrey Reynolds of Loughscur Castle
- 1624: Henry Crofton of Mohill
- 1639: John Blundell of Port
- 1640: John Blundell of Port
- 1641: Con O'Rourke of Castlecar, Manorhamilton
- 1642: Con O'Rourke of Castlecar, Manorhamilton
- 1645: James Ringe
- 1655: Sir George St. George, Carrick-on-Shannon
- 1656: Robert Parke, Newtown Castle, Dromahair
- 1657: James King, Charlestown, County Roscommon
- 1658: Edward Crofton
- 1659: Owen Wynn of Lurganboy
- 1663: Owen Wynn of Lurganboy
- 1682: Walter Jones of Dublin
- 1686: James Wynne of Lurganboy
- 1688: William Jones of Headfort
- 1689: Hugh O'Rorke of Clooncorrick
- 1698: Thomas Crofton
- 1699: William Lawder of Bonnybeg

== 18th century ==
- 1700:
- 1704: William Lawder of Bonnybeg
- 1705: Frederick Lawder of Cor
- 1706: William Lawder of Bonnybeg
- 1707:
- 1710: Ralph Gore of Belle Isle
- 1712: William Lawder of Bonnybeg
- 1713: James Lawder of Kilmore, County Roscommon
- 1714: Thomas Crofton
- 1715:
- 1718: Walter Jones of Headfort and Dublin
- 1720: Josias Campbell
- 1721: William Parsons of Garadice
- 1724: Owen Wynne
- 1725:
- 1729: Alexander Percy of Garadice
- 1731: John Peyton of Laheen
- 1732: Matthew Nesbitt
- 1733:
- 1737: Hugh Crofton
- 1738:
- 1741: Thomas Harris, Ballyoghter
- 1742: Sir Booth Gore, 2nd Baronet of Artarmon
- 1743:
- 1751: John Peyton of Laheen
- 1756: Samuel Cambell
- 1759: Robert Clements, 1st Earl of Leitrim
- 1762: Sir Morgan Crofton, 1st Baronet of Mohill Castle
- 1763: Thomas Tenison of Drumkirk
- 1764:
- 1771: John O'Brien of Drumhalla
- 1773: Henry Theophilus Clements
- 1774:
- 1777: Major Thomas Dickson of Woodville
- 1778:
- 1782: Patrick Cullen of Shreem
- 1783: James Johnston of Oakfield
- 1784: Richard St. George of Carrick
- 1785: William Shanly of Fearnaught and Willyfield
- 1787: John Peyton of Laheen
- 1788:
- 1791: William O'Brien; George Sargent
- 1792: Thomas Tenison of Castle Tenison (Kilronan Castle)
- 1794: William Rowley
- 1795: Gervais Bolton Jones
- 1795: Walter Jones of Headfort
- 1796: Nathaniel Clements, 2nd Earl of Leitrim
- 1798: Matthew Nesbitt

== 19th century ==
- 1800:
- 1804: Richard Irwin and Henry John Clements
- 1805: Peter La Touche, jnr
- 1806: John James Cullen
- 1807: James Cullen
- 1808: John La Touche
- 1809: Samuel White of Killakee, County Dublin
- 1810: Acheson O'Brien
- 1811: Joseph Johnston
- 1812: Andrew Johnston
- 1813: Francis Waldron
- 1814: Edward Waldron
- 1815: George Hamilton Conyngham Peyton
- 1816: John Percy
- 1817: John Hamilton Peyton
- 1818: John Godley of Killigar
- 1819: Alexander Percy
- 1820: Charles Henry Tottenham
- 1821: Francis Nesbitt
- 1822: Thomas H. J. Jones of Drumard
- 1821: William Irwin
- 1824: Loftes Anthony Tottenham, of Manorhamilton
- 1825: Cairncross Thomas Cullen, of Skreeney, Manorhamilton
- 1827: William C. Percy of Garridice, Ballinamore
- 1830: John Reynolds Peyton
- 1831: Francis O'Beime of Jamestown
- 1832: Hubert Kelly Waldron of Ashfort House, Drumsna
- 1833: Francis Nesbitt Cullen, of Screeny, Manor-Hamilton
- 1834: Owen Wynne of Hazelwood House, Sligo.
- 1835: Theophilus B Jones of Drumard
- 1835: Cairncross Thomas Cullen of Glenade
- 1836: Pierce Simpson of Cloncorick Castle, Carrigallen
- 1836: Francis Nisbett Cullen of Corry
- 1837: Hugh Walsh of Drumsna
- 1838: George Thomas Keppel, 6th Earl of Albemarle
- 1839: Charles Manners St. George of Hatley St. George, Carrick-on-Shannon
- 1840: Hugh Lyons-Montgomery of Belhavel
- 1841: Nicholas Loftus Tottenham
- 1842: Coote Mulloy of Hughestown
- 1843: John Robert Godley
- 1844:
- 1845: Edward King Tenison of Kilronan Castle
- 1847: Guy Lloyd of Croghan House
- 1848: George Lane-Fox.
- 1849: William LaTouch, of Harristown.
- 1850: William Johnston, of Kinlough House, Dundoran.
- 1851: Josias Rowley of Mount Campbell.
- 1853: William Robert La Touche of Bellevue
- 1854: John James Whyte of Newtown Manor.
- 1855: Hugh O'Beirne of Jamestown.
- 1857: William Ormsby-Gore, 2nd Baron Harlech
- 1858: Edward Maguire of Gortoral House, Swanlinbar.
- 1859: John La Touche of Harristown.
- 1860: Joseph Bennett Little of Kilrush, Ballinamore.
- 1861: George White of Cloone Grance.
- 1862: Hugh M'Ternan, Heapstown, Riverstown.
- 1863: John Massy, 6th Baron Massy of Duntrileague.
- 1864:
- 1866: Arthur Loftus Tottenham of Glenfarne Hall.
- 1868: John Marcus Clements of Glenboy.
- 1869: Guy Lloyd of Croghan.
- 1870: Henry Theophilus Clements of Lough Rynn.
- 1871: William Peyton.
- 1872: Joseph Story of Bingfield, County Cavan.
- 1874: Morgan George Crofton, 4th Baronet.
- 1875: William Acton of Brookville, County Dublin.
- 1877: Charles Cecil Beresford Whyte, of Hatley Manor.
- 1878: George Marsham of Headfort.
- 1879: James Reynolds Peyton of Laheen.
- 1879: William Henry White of Cloone Grange.
- 1881: Owen Wynne of Hazelwood House
- 1882: John ffolliott of Hollybrook House, County Sligo.
- 1883:
- 1884: James Johnstone of Kinlough House.
- 1885: George Ormsby-Gore, 3rd Baron Harlech.
- 1888: George Charles Loftus Tottenham.
- 1889: William Clifford Bermingham Otway-Ruthven.
- 1890: Johnstone William Robert Parke of Dunally.
- 1891: John O'Donnell.
- 1892: George Francis Stewart of Summerhill, County Dublin.
- 1893: Henry John Beresford Clements.
- 1894: Sir Gilbert King, 4th Baronet of County Roscommon.
- 1896: George Hewson of Dromahair.
- 1897: St George Robert Johnston of Mount Prospect, Kinlough.
- 1899: William Rowley of Mount Campbell.

== 20th century ==
- 1900: Peter La Touche of Bellevue.
- 1901:
- 1902: John Merrick Lloyd of Croghan House, County Roscommon.
- 1903:
- 1904: Sir Gilbert King, 4th Baronet of Roscommon.
- 1905:
- 1906: Duke Arthur Crofton of Lakefield.
- 1908: John George Adamson of Glenfarne Hall.
- 1908: Sir Robert Bellew Adams of Glenfarne Hall, Glenfarne.
- 1909: James Ormesby Lawder of Lawderdale.
- 1910: Arthur Montford Archer of Bellevue.
- 1911: Cecil Harman Baldwin St. George Whyte.
- 1912: Loftus Adam Studdert.
- 1915: John O'Donel of Larkfield.
