= Bellevue House, County Wicklow =

Country house in County Wicklow, Ireland

Bellevue House
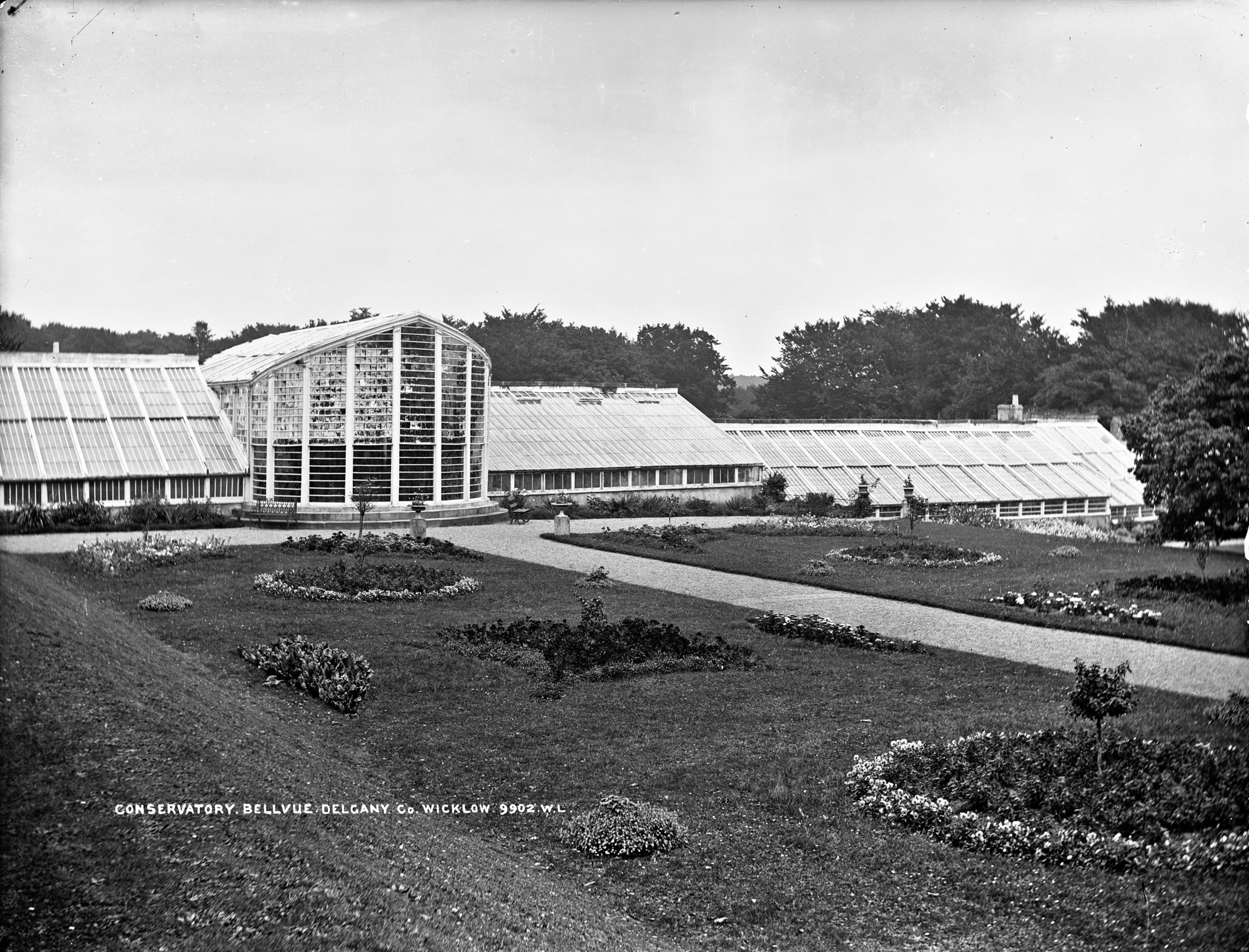
- The 'Glass Corridor' at Bellevue, consisting of a range of conservatories 264 feet long, begun c.1786. Photographed by Robert French c.1865-1914

- Location within Ireland
- Former names: Ballydonagh Estate

General information
- Location: near Delgany, County Wicklow, Ireland
- Coordinates: 53.140°N 6.114°W
- Owner: demolished in the early 1950s

Bellevue House was an 18th-century country house set in its own 300 acre (120 ha) demesne, in the village of Delgany, County Wicklow, Ireland. It is 25 km (16 miles) south of the Dublin. The house was built on an estate originally called Ballydonagh, after the townland which borders it to the south west. It was demolished in the 1950s. Delgany Golf Club is now located on the estate.

The house had extensive gardens with winding paths, large glasshouses and panoramic views across the Glen of the Downs (a wooded valley to the west) and across farmland eastward to the Irish Sea.

== History ==
The Ballydonagh demesne was bought in 1753 by David La Touche, a rich banker from Dublin of Huguenot extraction from his friend, Richard Chenevix Trench, the Anglican Archbishop of Dublin. He built a house between 1754 and 1756 at a cost of £30,000 and named it Bellevue.

In 1785 it was inherited by his son Peter, who moved in after in 1786 his wife Rebecca Vicars died and he married her cousin Elizabeth Vicars. Peter La Touche built Christ Church in Delgany in 1789 and his wife opened an orphanage and school for female children in the grounds of Bellevue. He died in 1828.

The estate was inherited by his nephew Peter La Touche, of Marlay, County Dublin and previously the Member of Parliament for County Leitrim. Peter died just two years later and it passed to his eldest son Peter David, who donated land to build St Patrick's church in nearby Greystones. Peter David died in 1857 and Bellevue then passed to his brother William Robert who lived until 1892. After William Robert the estate went to his brother Octavius La Touche (1824-1897) and then to Octavius' son Peter La Touche (1864-1904), a major in the Royal Dublin Fusiliers.

The 1901 Census of Ireland was carried out on the night of 31 March 1901, during which multiple houses were recorded within an area known as "Bellevue demesne". Of these, the only house occupied by a La Touche, presumably Bellevue House itself, was that in which Mary La Touch, an unmarried 40 year old woman, was marked as 'head of family', co-occupying with her sister Charlotte La Touche, an unmarried 23 year old. Mary and Charlotte were sisters of Peter La Touche, the owner of the house at that point. Five female servants were recorded as also living in the house with them. No other La Touche's were recorded as being at the house that evening.

Peter La Touche married Sophia Dora Elizabeth Tottenham in April 1902, but died at Bellevue in 1904, aged 39, and the estate was divided between his widow and his three sisters, one of whom, Frances Cecilia La Touche (c.1863-1942), subsequently moved into Bellevue with her husband Dr Archer.

The 1911 census of Ireland, carried out on the night of 2 April 1911, found Arthur Montfort Archer, a 54 year old retired doctor, as the head of family at Bellevue House alongside his wife Frances Cecilia, 48, and their three daughters. Eight domestic workers were also recorded as living at the house at the time.

The family then ran into financial difficulties and finally left Bellevue in 1913 after which the house fell into decay and was pulled down in the early 1950s. Part of the land was taken over by the Forestry Division of the Department of Lands.
