= Ballyfarnon =

Village in County Roscommon, Ireland

Ballyfarnon Béal Átha Fearnáin
- Village
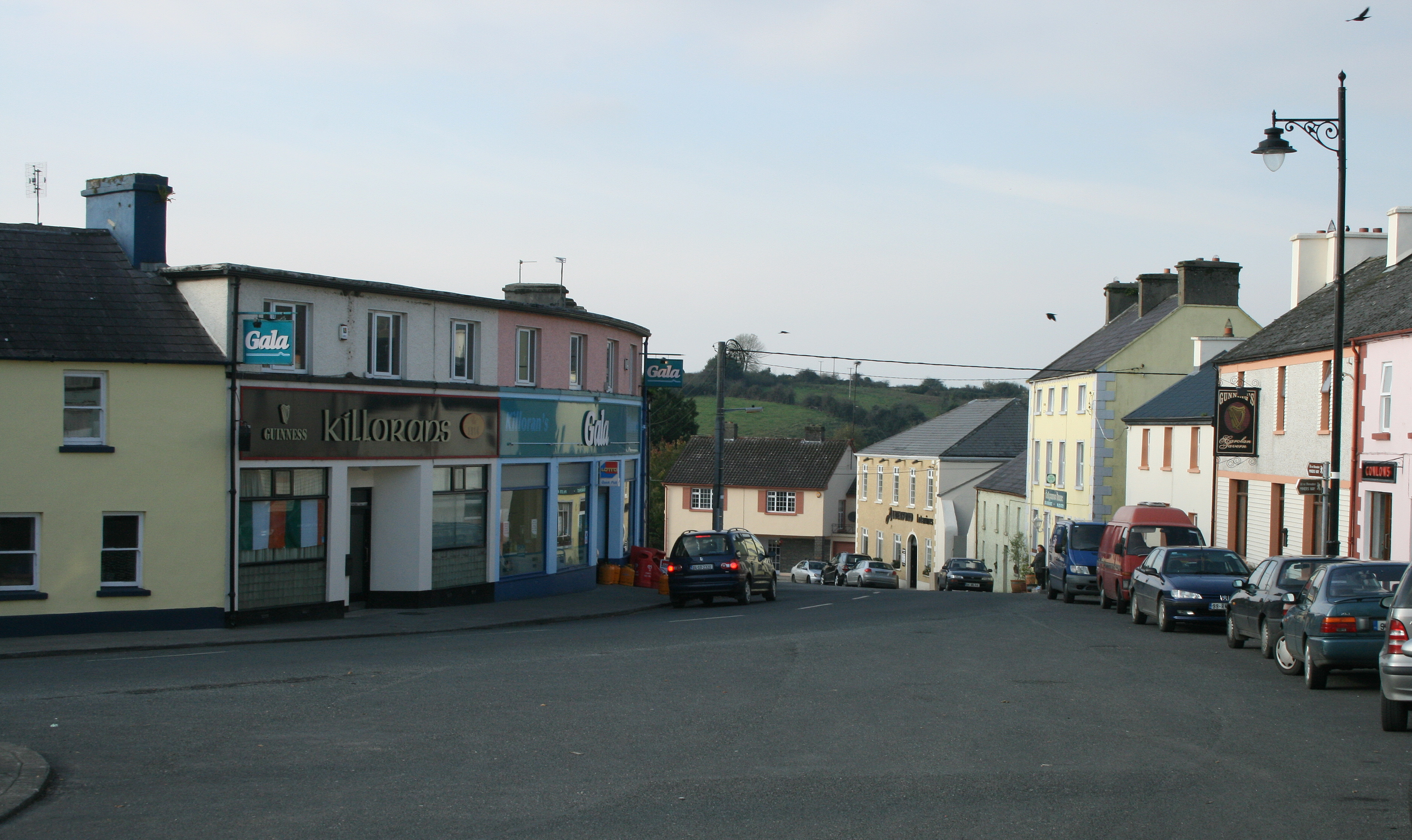

- Location in Ireland
- Coordinates: 54.0725°N 8.2047°W
- Country: Ireland
- Province: Connacht
- County: County Roscommon
- Elevation: 59 m (194 ft)

Population (2016)
  - Total: 187
- Irish Grid Reference: G863138

Ballyfarnon (historically Bellafernan, from Irish: Béal Átha Fearnáin, meaning 'ford-mouth of the alders') is a village in northern County Roscommon, Ireland. Built on the River Feorish at the foot of Arigna Mountain, it lies between Loughs Skean and Meelagh with Lough Arrow, Lough Allen, Lough Bo and Lough-na-Sool nearby. It lies on the Sligo/Leitrim R284 regional road on the border with County Sligo.

The first church at Kilronan, Keadue, County Roscommon, was built in the 8th century by St. Ronan and his daughter St. Lasair. It was replaced in 1339 by one built by Fergal O'Duigenan which was burned down in 1340 and replaced three years later by the church, one gable of which stands today. Sheltered by that gable is the vault of the McDermott Roes, in which Turlough O'Carolan was interred in 1738.

This gable is a memorial to the Gaelic Literary tradition from the 13th -18th century as represented by the O'Duigenans, hereditary erenachs of Kilronan (lay abbots who held church land from generation to generation), and chroniclers (as well as bards and ollavs-hereditary poets) to the MacDermots, Princes of Moylurg, down to Turlough O'Carolan, sometimes styled "The Last of the Bards". The O'Duigenans maintained a school of history on this site.

== Kilronan Castle ==
Kilronan Castle, which was also known as Castle Tenison, is a 19th-century castle dating from two different periods. The earlier part was built by Thomas Tenison, consisting of a 3-storey-over-basement, 3-bay symmetrical castellated block with slender corner turrets, pinnacled buttresses and tracery windows. This was built in about 1820, and may incorporate a Palladian style Georgian house. The later part is two storeys high, is irregular, and of rubble stone with a baronial tower.

The castle was inherited by Florence (née Tenison) wife of the Henry King-Tenison, 8th Earl of Kingston whose husband assumed the additional name of Tenison. The Tenisons were early photographers. In particular Edward King-Tenison travelled in Spain in the 1850s, where he took pictures of its castles and scenery. E.K. Tenison took photographs of Kilronan Castle in 1859 which were printed with albumen.

In 1814 the castle was occupied by Thomas Tenison. The castle is a now a hotel.

== Amenities ==
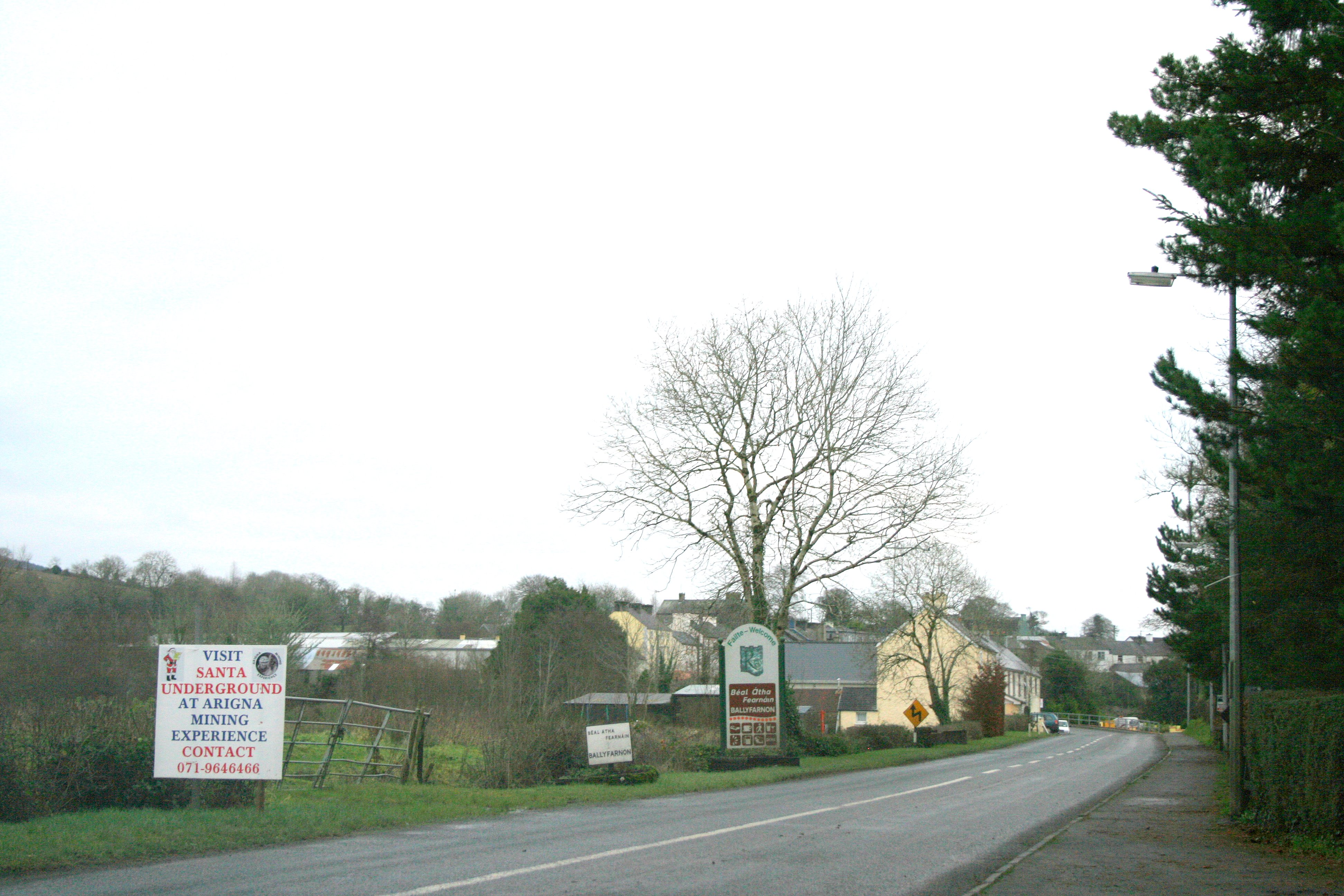
Approaching from the northwest on the R284

A memorial to a local musician and songwriter, Josie McDermott, lies in the village centre, and a memorial garden on the Feorish bank is dedicated to all who attended fair days in the village for centuries, and who worked in Arigna Coal Mines overlooking the village.

Kilronan Castle Hotel can be seen on walks to Lough Meelagh, the former home of the Earl of Kingston, and Alderford House, the last home of Turlough O'Carolan, is adjacent to the village. Turlough O'Carolan is buried in nearby Kilronan Abbey.

There is also a primary school, church, and GAA grounds in the area. There are two pubs in the village, although one is not open full-time. There is a garage/petrol-station(convenience shop), a grocery shop, a furniture shop, a steel building manufacturer and hardware store.

St. Lasair's well is a spring-fed holy well outside the village.

== See also ==
- List of towns and villages in Ireland
