= Keadue =

Keadue / Keadew Irish: Céideadh
- Village
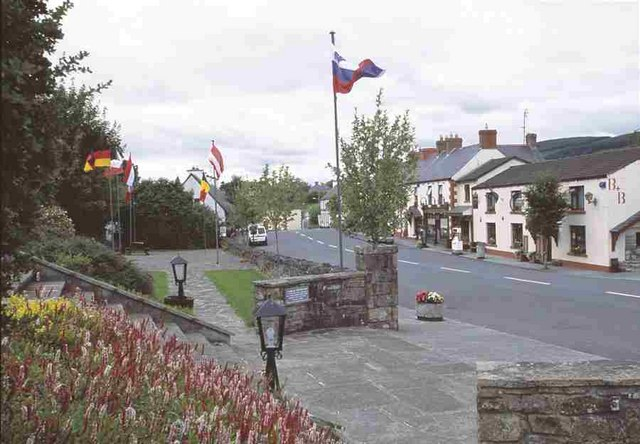
- Keadue's main street

- Location in Ireland
- Coordinates: 54°04′05″N 8°11′58″W
- Country: Ireland
- Province: Connacht
- County: County Roscommon
- Elevation: 82 m (269 ft)

Population (2016)
  - Total: 154
- Time zone: UTC+0 (WET)
  - Summer (DST): UTC-1 (IST (WEST))
- Irish Grid Reference: M835815

Keadue, officially Keadew (Irish: Céideadh), is a village in County Roscommon, Ireland. It is on the R284 and R285 regional roads close to the borders of County Leitrim and County Sligo.

Keadue is the burial place of the great Irish harper, Turlough O'Carolan, and the village holds an annual O'Carolan Harp Festival and Summer School to commemorate his life and work. Kilronan Castle lies on the shores of Lough Meelagh which also borders the town. Previously in ruins, it was restored and converted into a hotel in 2008. Keadue is a twice overall winner of the Irish Tidy Towns Competition in 1993 and 2003, as well as numerous awards for the tidiest town in the county.

== See also ==
- List of market houses in the Republic of Ireland
