= Lough Skean =

Lake in Ireland

- Location in Ireland
- Location: County Roscommon, County Sligo
- Coordinates: 54°3′43″N 8°13′6″W
- Catchment area: 78.31 km^{2} (30.2 sq mi)
- Basin countries: Ireland
- Max. length: 1.5 km (0.9 mi)
- Max. width: 0.9 km (0.6 mi)
- Surface area: 1.14 km^{2} (0.44 sq mi)
- Surface elevation: 48 m (157 ft)

Lough Skean is a freshwater lake in the northwest of Ireland. It is located mostly in north County Roscommon with a smaller part in County Sligo.

== Geography ==
Lough Skean measures about 2 km (1.2 mi) long and 1 km (0.6 mi) wide. It lies about 15 km (9 mi) west of Drumshanbo near the village of Ballyfarnon.

== See also ==
- List of loughs in Ireland
