= Herbert Gaussen =

Irish cricketer

Personal information
- Full name: Herbert Ponsonby Loftus Gaussen
- Born: 21 February 1871; Edenfarm, Ireland
- Died: 28 June 1956 (aged 85); Vasey, Victoria, Australia
- Batting: Unknown
- Bowling: Unknown
- Relatives: Arthur Loftus Tottenham (father)

Domestic team information
- Years: Team
- 1903/04: Hawke's Bay
- 1909: Hertfordshire
- 1910/11: Marylebone Cricket Club

Career statistics
Competition	First-class
Matches	11
Runs scored	260
Batting average	13.00
100s/50s	–/1
Top score	77
Balls bowled	60
Wickets	1
Bowling average	26.00
5 wickets in innings	–
10 wickets in match	–
Best bowling	1/26
Catches/stumpings	1/–
- Source: Cricinfo, 9 July 2019

Herbert Ponsonby Loftus Gaussen (born Herbert Ponsonby Loftus Tottenham; 21 February 1871 – 28 June 1956) was an Irish first-class cricketer.

The son of Arthur Loftus Tottenham and his wife, Sarah Ann Gore, he was born at Edenfarm in County Leitrim in February 1871. He married Emilia Gaussen of Brookmans Park in 1897. He was admitted to the London Stock Exchange in 1902, before emigrating to New Zealand, where he worked as a general carrier. While living in New Zealand, he made his debut in first-class cricket for Hawke's Bay against Canterbury at Napier. He served in the British Army, resigning his commission with the Royal Irish Rifles in April 1906.

He assumed the surname Gaussen by royal decree in September 1906, when his wife's father died and she inherited his estate. A middle-order batsman, Gaussen played ten of his eleven first-class matches for the Marylebone Cricket Club (MCC) on the MCC tour of the West Indies in 1910–11. He scored 260 runs on the tour at an average of 14.44. His highest score was 77, the top score of the match, when a West Indies XI played MCC at Georgetown. In addition to playing first-class cricket, he also played minor counties cricket for Hertfordshire in 1909, making four appearances in the Minor Counties Championship.

He served in the Royal Naval Volunteer Reserve (RNVR) in the early stages of the First World War, gaining a temporary commission as a lieutenant in September 1914. He transferred back to the Royal Irish Rifles prior to March 1916, serving as a captain. He was seconded to the Machine Gun Corps in March 1916. He retired due to ill health in September 1919. He later emigrated to Australia, where his wife owned considerable property in Victoria. He died in June 1956 at Vasey, Victoria.
