= John Brady (MP) =

Irish doctor and politician (1812–1887)

John Brady (1812–1887) was an Irish medical doctor, landlord, and nationalist politician from County Leitrim.

Born in County Cavan, Brady was the son of Tobias and Margaret Brady. He was a member of both the Royal College of Physicians and the Royal College of Surgeons.

He had addresses in London, Cambridgeshire and Rugby, Warwickshire. He owned over 2,000 acres of land in County Leitrim by the 1870s, mostly within that part of the Poor Law Union of Bawnboy which was in county Leitrim, but also in Cloone, near Mohill.

In 1847, he married Sarah Rayner of Ely, Cambridgeshire. They had two daughters.

At the 1852 general election he was elected as a Tenant Right candidate to be one of the two Members of Parliament (MPs) for County Leitrim. He was re-elected at the next five general elections, serving as MP for Leitrim for 27 years until he retired in 1879 due to ill-health.

Brady died in late March 1887, at his home near Rugby.

== Arms ==
Coat of arms of John Brady

Notes
Granted 12 August 1873 by Sir John Bernard Burke, Ulster King of Arms.
Crest
A cherubim Proper winged Or.
Escutcheon
Sable a sun in splendour Or in the dexter chief point and a hand Proper pointing thereto in the sinister base.
Motto
In Deo Fides

Parliament of the United Kingdom
Preceded by Edward King-Tenison; Charles Clements	Member of Parliament for County Leitrim; 1852 – 1880; With: Hugh Lyons-Montgomery; William Ormsby-Gore; Francis O'Beirne	Succeeded by Francis O'Beirne; Arthur Loftus Tottenham
