= Samuel White (Irish politician) =

Irish Whig politician (c.1784 - 1854)

Member of Parliament for County Leitrim
- In office 5 April 1824 – 12 August 1847 Serving with John Marcus Clements (1824–1826 & 1830–1832); Robert Bermingham Clements (1826–1830 & 1832–1839); William Clements (1839–1847)
- Preceded by: Luke White; John Marcus Clements
- Succeeded by: Edward King-Tenison; Charles Skeffington Clements

Personal details
- Born: c. 1784
- Died: 29 May 1854
- Party: Whig

Samuel White (c. 1784 – 29 May 1854) was an Irish Whig politician.

White was the second son of Luke White, MP for County Leitrim from 1818 to his death in 1824, and Elizabeth née de la Maziere. He was also brother of Henry White, MP for County Dublin, and Luke White, Junior, Repeal Association MP for County Longford, and, in 1821, married Salisbury Anne Rothe, daughter of George Rothe. He may also have served briefly in the army.

Between 1809 and 1810, he served as High Sheriff of Leitrim and then, upon the death of his father, he received an annuity of £7,000, and immediately declared to stand for election as MP for Leitrim at a by-election in 1824, stating his principles were similar to those of his father who had "loved Ireland and belonged to no party". He was elected unopposed, but then remained fairly silent in the Commons, emulating his brother, Henry, who generally sided with the Whigs. For example, he divided for an advance of capital to Ireland, for inquiries into the Irish church, and against the Irish insurrection bill and the new churches bill. During this time, he also served on the select committee on the state of Ireland.

As the next election dawned in 1826, he was criticised by pro-Catholic supporters for allying with his Tory colleague John Marcus Clements, and in response claimed to have followed his father's independent and liberal conduct. He was, nevertheless, returned again for the seat and began to serve as foreman of the Leitrim grand jury, a role he would reprise in 1830.

In parliament, he generally voted for Catholic relief, emancipation for both Catholics and Jews, and reform, and was then returned at elections to the seat for all elections through to 1847, when he retired.

Parliament of the United Kingdom
Preceded by Luke White; John Marcus Clements	Member of Parliament for County Leitrim; 1824–1847; With: John Marcus Clements (1824–1826 & 1830–1832); Robert Bermingham Clements (1826–1830 & 1832–1839); William Clements (1839–1847)	Succeeded by Edward King-Tenison; Charles Skeffington Clements
