= George Lane-Fox (sheriff) =

English landowner and politician

George Lane-Fox JP DL
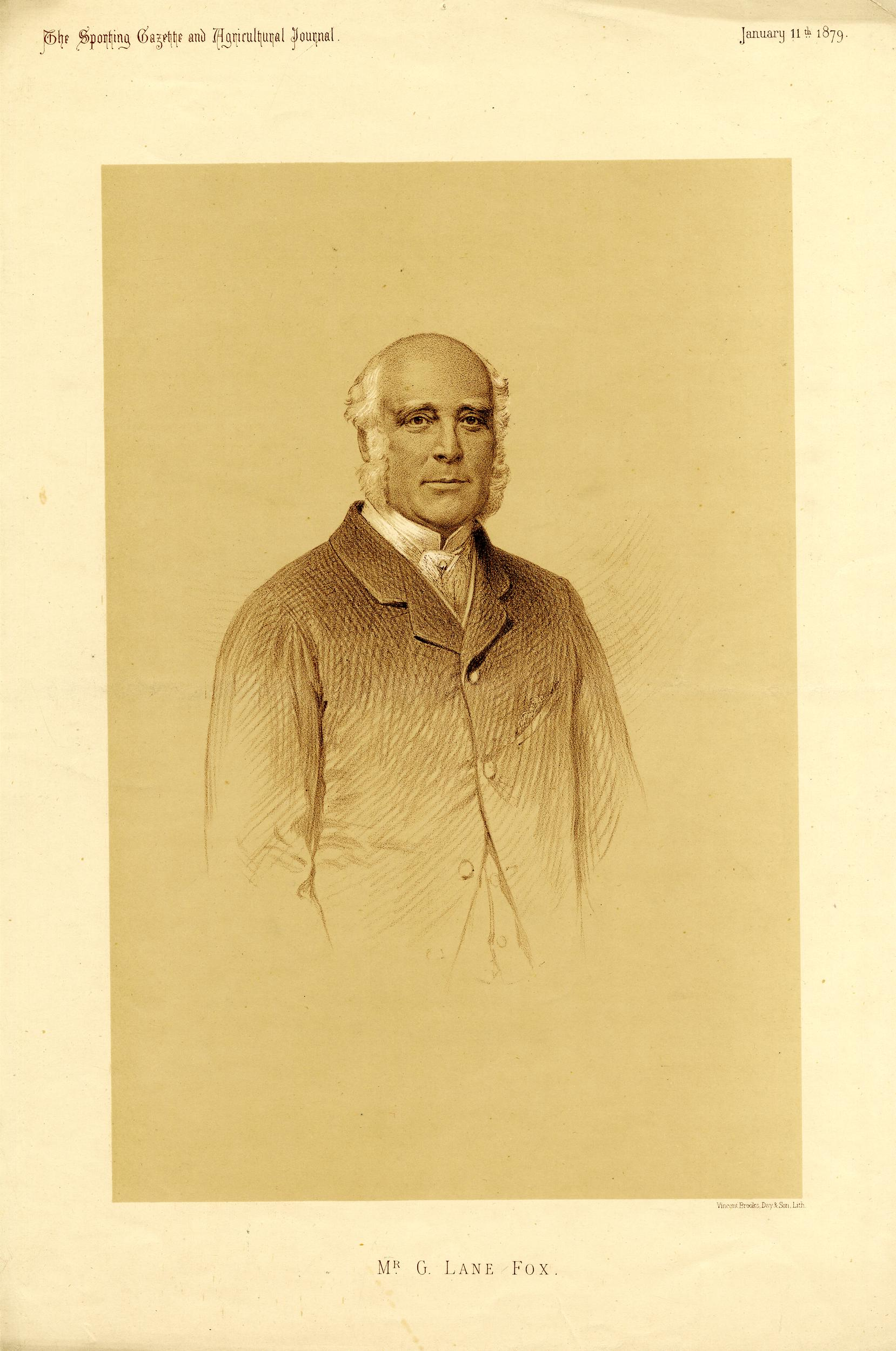
- Portrait of Lane-Fox; illustration to "The Country Gentleman. Sporting Gazette and Agricultural Journal". 1879

High Sheriff of Yorkshire
- In office 1873–1874
- Preceded by: Frederick Bacon Frank
- Succeeded by: The Hon. Arthur Duncombe

High Sheriff of Leitrim
- In office 1848–1848
- Preceded by: Guy Lloyd
- Succeeded by: William LaTouch

Personal details
- Born: 13 November 1816
- Died: 2 November 1896 (aged 79)
- Spouse: Katherine Mary Stein (m. 1837; died 1873)
- Relations: James Fox-Lane (grandfather); George Lane-Fox, 1st Baron Bingley (grandson)
- Children: 6
- Parent(s): George Lane-Fox; Georgiana Henrietta Buckley
- Education: Eton College
- Alma mater: Christ Church, Oxford

George Lane-Fox JP DL (13 November 1816 – 2 November 1896), of Bowcliffe Hall, was an English landowner and politician.

== Early life ==
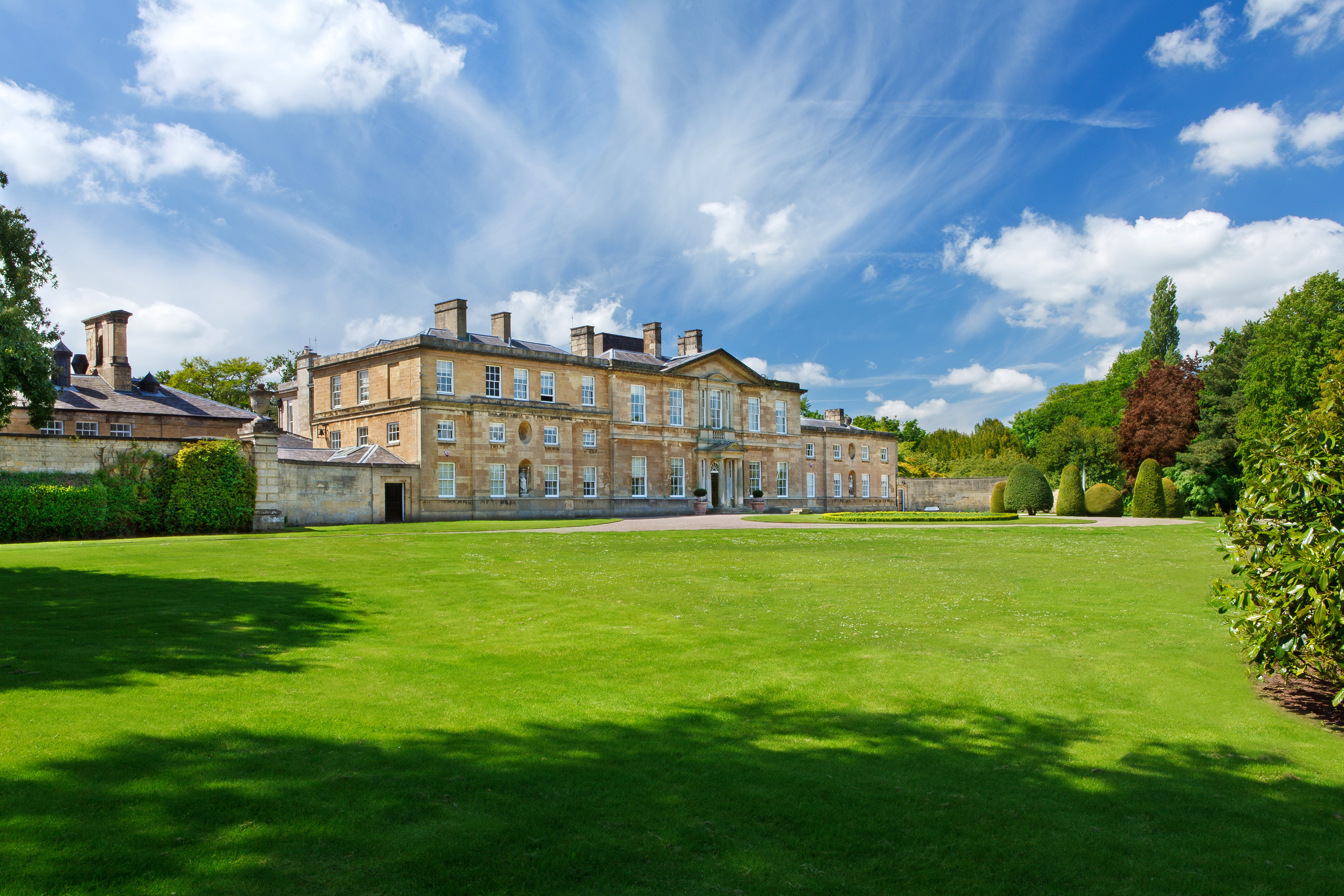
Bowcliffe Hall, 2015

Lane-Fox was born on 13 November 1816. He was the only son of George Lane-Fox, MP for Beverley, and Georgiana Henrietta Buckley. His sister, Frederica Elizabeth Lane-Fox, married Hon. Sir Adolphus Liddell (a son of the 1st Baron Ravensworth). By early 1824, his parents were separated, and by the late 1820s, his mother "had a 'notorious' and indiscreet affair" with the Earl of Chesterfield, who later abandoned her to marry Anne Weld Forester in 1830. His brother Sackville succeeded him in 1840.

His father was the eldest son of James Fox-Lane, of Bramham Park, and Hon. Mary Lucy Pitt (a daughter of the 1st Baron Rivers). His maternal grandparents were Edward Percy Buckley and Lady Georgiana West (a daughter of the 2nd Earl De La Warr).

He was educated at Eton and Christ Church, Oxford.

== Career ==
Lane-Fox was a Justice of the Peace and a Deputy Lieutenant, for the West Riding of County York.

He also served as High Sheriff of Leitrim in 1846 and High Sheriff of Yorkshire in 1873.

== Personal life ==
On 17 November 1837, Lane-Fox was married to Katherine Mary Stein (1813–1873), daughter of Grace (née Bushby) and John Stein, MP for Bletchingley. Together, they were the parents of three sons and three daughters, including:

- George Sackville Frederick Lane-Fox (1838–1918), who married Fanny Maule Slade, daughter of Lt.-Gen. Marcus Slade, in 1870. After her death in 1875, he married Annette Mary Weld-Blundell, daughter of Thomas Weld-Blundell of Blundell Hall, in 1879.
- James Thomas Richard Lane-Fox (1841–1906), who married Lucy St. John-Mildmay, a daughter of Humphrey St John-Mildmay, in 1868.
- Caroline Alexina Lane-Fox (1845–1924), who married Maj. John Cavendish Orred, son of George Orred and Matilda Thistlethwayte.
- Kathleen Mary Lane-Fox (c. 1849–1930), who married Francis Charles Liddell, son of Col. Hon. George Liddell (a son of the 1st Baron Ravensworth) and Cecil Elizabeth Jane Wellesley (a granddaughter of the 1st Earl Cadogan and the 1st Earl of Mornington), in 1884.

His wife died on 4 July 1873. Lane-Fox died on 2 November 1896.

=== Descendants ===
Through his youngest son James, he was a grandfather of George Lane-Fox, 1st Baron Bingley (1870–1947), an MP for Barkston Ash, and Capt. Edward Lane-Fox (1874–1949).

Honorary titles
Preceded by Guy Lloyd	High Sheriff of Leitrim; 1848–1848	Succeeded by William LaTouch
Preceded by Frederick Bacon Frank	High Sheriff of Yorkshire; 1873–1874	Succeeded by The Hon. Arthur Duncombe
