= Charles Skeffington Clements =

Irish politician

The Honourable Charles Skeffington Clements

Member of Parliament for County Leitrim
- In office 12 August 1847 – 26 July 1852 Serving with Edward King-Tenison
- Preceded by: Samuel White; William Clements
- Succeeded by: Hugh Lyons-Montgomery; John Brady

Personal details
- Born: 1807
- Died: 29 September 1877 (aged 70)
- Party: Whig
- Parent(s): Nathaniel Clements, 2nd Earl of Leitrim; Mary Bermingham

Charles Skeffington Clements (1807 – 29 September 1877) was an Irish Whig politician.

Clements was the third son of Nathaniel Clements, 2nd Earl of Leitrim—one of the first two MPs to sit for County Leitrim after the Acts of Union 1801—and Mary Bermingham, daughter of William Bermingham and Mary née Ruttledge. A captain in the army, he died unmarried in 1877.

Clements was elected Whig MP for County Leitrim at the 1847 general election and held the seat until 1852 when he was unseated, finishing third and bottom in the poll.

Parliament of the United Kingdom
Preceded by Samuel White; William Clements	Member of Parliament for County Leitrim; 1847–1852; With: Edward King-Tenison	Succeeded by Hugh Lyons-Montgomery; John Brady
