= Francis O'Beirne =

Irish politician

Francis O'Beirne MP

Member of Parliament for County Leitrim
- In office 14 July 1876 – 24 November 1885 Serving with Arthur Loftus Tottenham (1885 – 1880); John Brady (1876 – 1880)
- Preceded by: John Brady; William Ormsby-Gore
- Succeeded by: Constituency abolished

Personal details
- Born: 1833
- Died: 11 April 1899 (aged 65–66)
- Party: Home Rule League

Francis O'Beirne (1833 – 11 April 1899) was an Irish Home Rule League politician. He served as a Member of Parliament (MP) for County Leitrim from 1876 to 1885.

He first stood for election in Leitrim in 1874 but was unsuccessful. He was then elected at a by-election in 1876 and held the seat until it was abolished in 1885.

Parliament of the United Kingdom
Preceded by John Brady; William Ormsby-Gore	Member of Parliament for County Leitrim; 1876 – 1885; With: Arthur Loftus Tottenham (1885 – 1880); John Brady (1876 – 1880)	Constituency abolished
