= Arthur Loftus Tottenham =

British politician

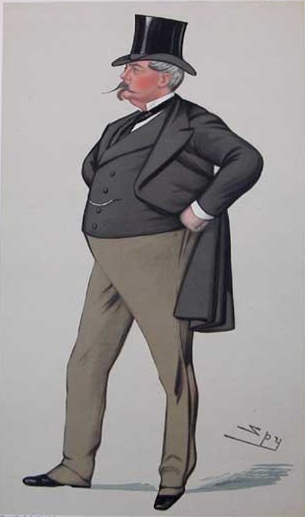
"Lofty" Tottenham as caricatured by Spy (Leslie Ward) in Vanity Fair, April 1882

Arthur Loftus Tottenham (5 April 1838 – 4 December 1887) was a landowner and Conservative politician who sat in the House of Commons from 1880 to 1887.

== Biography ==
Tottenham was the eldest son of Nicholas Loftus Tottenham of Glenfarne Hall, [Glenfarne, Co Leitrim], and his wife Anna Maria Hopkins, daughter of Sir Francis Hopkins. He was educated at Eton and was a captain in the Rifle Brigade. He owned Glenfarne Hall and an estate at Enniskillen, the fourth largest estate in Britain and Ireland, which amounted to over 14,000 acres (57 km^{2}). He became a justice of the peace for the counties of Leitrim, Cavan, and Fermanagh, and a Deputy Lieutenant for County Leitrim. He became High Sheriff of Leitrim in 1866.

In 1876 Tottenham stood for parliament unsuccessfully at County Leitrim but was elected a Member of Parliament for Leitrim in 1880. He held the seat until the Redistribution of Seats Act 1885 when he was elected MP for Winchester. He held the seat until his death at the age of 49. He was buried at St Andrew's Church, Hove.

Tottenham married Sarah Ann Gore in 1859. Major Arthur Gore Loftus Tottenham (1874–1940) and Herbert Ponsonby Loftus Tottenham (1871–1956) were among their children.

Parliament of the United Kingdom
Preceded by Francis O'Beirne; John Brady	Member of Parliament for County Leitrim; 1880 – 1885; With: John Brady	Constituency abolished
Preceded by Viscount Baring; Richard Moss	Member of Parliament for Winchester; 1885 – 1888	Succeeded by Richard Moss
