= County Leitrim (UK Parliament constituency) =

UK Parliamentary constituency in Ireland, 1801–1885 and 1918–1922

- Former county constituency for the House of Commons
- County: County Leitrim

1801–1885
- Seats: 2
- Created from: County Leitrim (IHC)
- Replaced by: North Leitrim; South Leitrim

1918–1922
- Seats: 1
- Created from: North Leitrim; South Leitrim
- Replaced by: Leitrim–Roscommon North

County Leitrim was a parliamentary constituency in Ireland, represented in the House of Commons of the United Kingdom of Great Britain and Ireland. It returned two MPs from 1801 to 1885 and one from 1918 to 1922.

== Boundaries ==
This constituency comprised the whole of County Leitrim.

== Members of Parliament ==
=== MPs 1801–85 ===
Election	1st Member	1st Party	2nd Member	2nd Party
1801	Nathaniel Clements, Viscount Clements, later Earl of Leitrim	Whig	Theophilus Jones	Tory
1802	Nathaniel Clements, Viscount Clements, later Earl of Leitrim	Whig	Peter La Touche	Whig
1805 by-election	Henry John Clements	Tory	Peter La Touche	Whig
1806	Henry John Clements	Tory	William Gore	
1807	Henry John Clements	Tory	John La Touche	Whig
1818	Luke White	Tory	John La Touche	Whig
1820	Luke White	Tory	John Marcus Clements	Tory
1824 by-election	Samuel White	Whig	John Marcus Clements	Tory
1826	Samuel White	Whig	Robert Clements, Viscount Clements	Whig
1830	Samuel White	Whig	John Marcus Clements	Tory
1832	Samuel White	Whig	Robert Clements, Viscount Clements	Whig
1839 by-election	Samuel White	Whig	William Clements, Viscount Clements, later Earl of Leitrim	Whig
1847	Edward King-Tenison	Whig	Charles Skeffington Clements	Whig
1852	Hugh Lyons-Montgomery	Conservative	John Brady	Ind. Irish
1858 by-election	William Ormsby-Gore, later Baron Harlech	Conservative	John Brady	Ind. Irish
1859	William Ormsby-Gore, later Baron Harlech	Conservative	John Brady	Liberal
1865	William Ormsby-Gore, later Baron Harlech	Conservative	John Brady	Liberal
1868	William Ormsby-Gore, later Baron Harlech	Conservative	John Brady	Liberal
1874	William Ormsby-Gore, later Baron Harlech	Conservative	John Brady	Home Rule
1876 by-election	Francis O'Beirne	Home Rule	John Brady	Home Rule
1880	Francis O'Beirne	Home Rule	Arthur Loftus Tottenham	Conservative
1885	Constituency divided: see North Leitrim and South Leitrim			

=== MPs 1918–22 ===
Election	Member	Party	Note
1918	Single member constituency created		
1918, December 14	James Dolan	Sinn Féin	Did not take his seat at Westminster
1922, October 26	UK constituency abolished		

== Elections ==
=== Elections in the 1830s ===
General election 1830: Leitrim (2 seats)
Party	Candidate	Votes	%
Tory	John Marcus Clements	285	39.6
Whig	Samuel White	218	30.3
Whig	Robert Bermingham Clements	212	29.5
Whig	Luke White	4	0.6
Turnout		436	72.4
Registered electors		602	
Majority		67	9.3
Tory gain from Whig			
Majority		6	0.8
Whig hold			

General election 1831: Leitrim (2 seats)
Party	Candidate	Votes	%
Tory	John Marcus Clements	Unopposed	
Whig	Samuel White	Unopposed	
Registered electors		602	
Tory hold			
Whig hold			

General election 1832: Leitrim (2 seats)
Party	Candidate	Votes	%
Whig	Samuel White	730	39.1
Whig	Robert Bermingham Clements	625	33.5
Tory	John Marcus Clements	513	27.5
Majority		112	6.0
Turnout		1,217	92.3
Registered electors		1,318	
Whig hold			
Whig gain from Tory			

General election 1835: Leitrim (2 seats)
Party	Candidate	Votes	%
Whig	Samuel White	Unopposed	
Whig	Robert Bermingham Clements	Unopposed	
Registered electors		1,437	
Whig hold			
Whig hold			

General election 1837: Leitrim (2 seats)
Party	Candidate	Votes	%
Whig	Samuel White	Unopposed	
Whig	Robert Bermingham Clements	Unopposed	
Registered electors		1,734	
Whig hold			
Whig hold			

Clements' death caused a by-election.

By-election, 6 March 1839: Leitrim
Party	Candidate	Votes	%
Whig	William Clements	Unopposed	
Whig hold			

=== Elections in the 1840s ===
General election 1841: Leitrim (2 seats)
Party	Candidate	Votes	%	±%
Whig	Samuel White	Unopposed		
Whig	William Clements	Unopposed		
Registered electors		1,488		
Whig hold				
Whig hold				

General election 1847: Leitrim (2 seats)
Party	Candidate	Votes	%	±%
Whig	Edward King-Tenison	389	34.5	N/A
Whig	Charles Skeffington Clements	376	33.4	N/A
Conservative	John Robert Godley	329	29.2	New
Independent	John Reynolds Dickson	32	2.8	New
Majority		47	4.2	N/A
Turnout		563 (est)	41.5 (est)	N/A
Registered electors		1,357		
Whig hold		Swing	N/A	
Whig hold		Swing	N/A	

=== Elections in the 1850s ===
General election 1852: Leitrim (2 seats)
Party	Candidate	Votes	%	±%
Conservative	Hugh Lyons-Montgomery	617	36.1	+6.9
Independent Irish	John Brady	551	32.3	N/A
Whig	Charles Skeffington Clements	540	31.6	−4.0
Turnout		854 (est)	67.5 (est)	+26.0
Registered electors		1,265		
Majority		77	4.5	N/A
Conservative gain from Whig		Swing	+3.9	
Majority		11	0.7	N/A
Independent Irish gain from Whig		Swing		

General election 1857: Leitrim (2 seats)
Party	Candidate	Votes	%	±%
Conservative	Hugh Lyons-Montgomery	1,577	49.7	+13.6
Independent Irish	John Brady	1,006	31.7	−0.6
Whig	Edward King-Tenison	591	18.6	−13.0
Turnout		1,587 (est)	60.4 (est)	−7.1
Registered electors		2,628		
Majority		986	20.1	+15.6
Conservative hold		Swing	+7.0	
Majority		415	13.1	+12.4
Independent Irish hold		Swing	−3.7	

Montgomery resigned by accepting the office of Steward of the Manor of Hempholme, causing a by-election.

By-election, 17 May 1858: Leitrim
Party	Candidate	Votes	%	±%
Conservative	William Ormsby-Gore	Unopposed		
Conservative hold				

General election 1859: Leitrim (2 seats)
Party	Candidate	Votes	%	±%
Conservative	William Ormsby-Gore	Unopposed		
Liberal	John Brady	Unopposed		
Registered electors		2,404		
Conservative hold				
Liberal hold				

=== Elections in the 1860s ===
General election 1865: Leitrim (2 seats)
Party	Candidate	Votes	%	±%
Conservative	William Ormsby-Gore	1,383	42.1	N/A
Liberal	John Brady	1,011	30.8	N/A
Liberal	Edward King-Tenison	892	27.1	N/A
Majority		372	11.3	N/A
Turnout		2,335 (est)	97.7 (est)	N/A
Registered electors		2,389		
Conservative hold		Swing	N/A	
Liberal hold		Swing	N/A	

General election 1868: Leitrim (2 seats)
Party	Candidate	Votes	%	±%
Conservative	William Ormsby-Gore	Unopposed		
Liberal	John Brady	Unopposed		
Registered electors		2,637		
Conservative hold				
Liberal hold				

=== Elections in the 1870s ===
General election 1874: Leitrim (2 seats)
Party	Candidate	Votes	%	±%
Home Rule	John Brady	1,313	37.9	New
Conservative	William Ormsby-Gore	1,098	31.7	N/A
Home Rule	Francis O'Beirne	1,055	30.4	New
Turnout		2,282 (est)	88.8 (est)	N/A
Registered electors		2,571		
Majority		215	6.2	N/A
Home Rule gain from Liberal		Swing	N/A	
Majority		43	1.3	N/A
Conservative hold		Swing	N/A	

Gore succeeded to the peerage, becoming Lord Harlech, and causing a by-election.

1876 County Leitrim by-election (1 seat)
Party	Candidate	Votes	%	±%
Home Rule	Francis O'Beirne	1,276	58.9	−9.4
Conservative	Arthur Loftus Tottenham	885	40.8	+9.1
Home Rule	Charles McGowan	7	0.3	N/A
Majority		391	18.1	N/A
Turnout		2,168	85.4	−3.4
Registered electors		2,383		
Home Rule gain from Conservative		Swing	+9.3	

=== Elections in the 1880s ===
General election 1880: Leitrim (2 seats)
Party	Candidate	Votes	%	±%
Conservative	Arthur Loftus Tottenham	1,038	33.1	+1.4
Home Rule	Francis O'Beirne	837	26.7	−10.2
Home Rule	Thomas Quinn	668	21.3	−10.4
Home Rule	Isaac Nelson	593	18.9	N/A
Majority		201	6.4	+0.2
Turnout		2,087 (est)	87.6 (est)	−1.2
Registered electors		2,383		
Conservative hold		Swing	+5.6	
Home Rule hold		Swing	-5.5	

=== Elections in the 1910s ===
1918 general election: Leitrim
Party	Candidate	Votes	%	±%
Sinn Féin	James Dolan	17,711	85.1	
Irish Parliamentary	Gerald Farrell	3,096	14.9	
Majority		14,615	70.2	
Turnout		20,807	69.2	
Registered electors		30,079		
Sinn Féin win (new seat)				
