= Robert Bermingham Clements, Viscount Clements =

Irish politician

Robert Bermingham Clements, Viscount Clements (May 1805 – 24 January 1839) was an Irish politician.

The son of the Earl of Leitrim, Clements grew up at Lough Rynn, County Leitrim. He served as a captain in the Prince of Wales's Militia, based in County Donegal. At the 1826 UK general election, he stood as a Whig in County Leitrim. He won the seat, and held it in 1830, but lost it at the 1831 UK general election. At the 1832 UK general election, he won it back, and held it in 1835 and 1837, serving until his death in 1839. He was succeeded both as Viscount Clements and in Parliament by his younger brother.

Parliament of the United Kingdom
| Preceded by John Marcus Clements; Samuel White | Member of Parliament for County Leitrim; 1832–1839; With: Samuel White | Succeeded by Samuel White; William Clements |
