= Peter La Touche (died 1830) =

Landowner and Irish politician

Peter La Touche (c. 1775 – 11 February 1830) was a landowner and Irish politician.

The La Touche family were Huguenots originally from France and settled in Ireland after the revocation of the Edict of Nantes which deprived the French Protestants of all religious and civil liberties, leading to largescale emigration.

He was the son of David La Touche MP, of Marlay, County Dublin and educated at Harrow School (1786–1791) and Trinity College Dublin He succeeded his uncle Peter Latouche, MP, to Bellevue House, County Wicklow in 1828.

He became a Member of Parliament for County Leitrim 1802–1806.

He married the Hon. Charlotte Maude, daughter of Cornwallis, 1st Viscount Hawarden, with whom he had nine sons and five daughters. He was succeeded in turn by his sons Peter David and William Robert.

Peter and his brother John were governors of the Female Orphanage Kirwan House on Dublin's North Circular Road.

== Bibliography ==
- "LATOUCHE, Peter (?1775-1830), of Bellevue, co. Wicklow". History of Parliament Online. Archived from the original on 9 May 2012.
- Leigh Rayment's Historical List of MPs
- "Edict of Nantes: French history". Encyclopedia Britannica. Britannica.

Parliament of the United Kingdom
Preceded by Nathaniel Clements and Theophilus Jones	Member of Parliament for County Leitrim; 1802 – 1806; With: Nathaniel Clements 1802–1805; Henry John Clements 1805–1806	Succeeded by William Gore and Henry John Clements
