= Lough Meelagh =

Lake in County Roscommon, Ireland

- Loch Míolach (Irish)
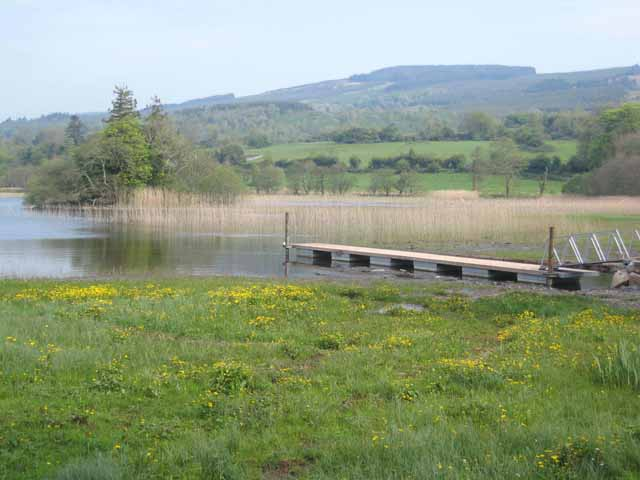
- The lake in 2008 with crannóg visible

- Location in Ireland
- Location: County Roscommon
- Coordinates: 54°3′27″N 8°9′54″W
- Catchment area: 7.04 km^{2} (2.7 sq mi)
- Basin countries: Ireland
- Max. length: 2.3 km (1.4 mi)
- Max. width: 0.9 km (0.6 mi)
- Surface area: 1.16 km^{2} (0.45 sq mi)
- Average depth: 4 m (13 ft)
- Max. depth: 14 m (46 ft)
- Surface elevation: 50 m (160 ft)
- Islands: Orchard Island

Lough Meelagh (Irish: Loch Míolach) is a freshwater lake in the northwest of Ireland. It is located in north County Roscommon.

== Geography ==
Lough Meelagh measures about 2 km (1.2 mi) long and 1 km (0.6 mi) wide. It lies about 10 km (6 mi) west of Drumshanbo, near the village of Keadue. The Kilronan Castle estate occupies the western shore of the lake.

== Natural history ==
Fish species in Lough Meelagh include perch, roach, pike, and the critically endangered European eel.

== See also ==
- List of loughs in Ireland
