= Arthur Archer (rugby union) =

Irish rugby union player

- Full name: Arthur Montfort Archer
- Born: 16 September 1856 County Kildare, Ireland
- Died: 17 September 1930 (aged 74) Moneymore, Northern Ireland
- School: The Royal School, Armagh
- University: Trinity College Dublin
- Occupation: Physician

Rugby union career
- Position: Forward
International career
| Years | Team | Apps | (Points) |
| 1879 | Ireland | 1 | (0) |

Arthur Montfort Archer (16 September 1856 — 17 September 1930) was an Irish international rugby union player.

Born on County Kildare, Archer attended The Royal School, Armagh, was an active sportsman at Trinity College Dublin. He gained an Ireland cap against Scotland at Belfast in 1879 and the following year captained the Dublin University XI against the Australian cricket team, which they held to a draw in a rain-interrupted match.

Archer, a physician, was a Surgeon Lieutenant Colonel with the 1st Cheshire Royal Garrison Artillery and served during World War I on a ship transporting troops from India. He served on the Chester City Council while based in the northwest of England, but lived his later years in Ireland, and was the High Sheriff of Leitrim in 1910.

== See also ==
- List of Ireland national rugby union players
