= Parkanaur House =

House in County Tyrone, Northern Ireland

Coordinates: 54°29′49.2″N 6°51′4.93″W

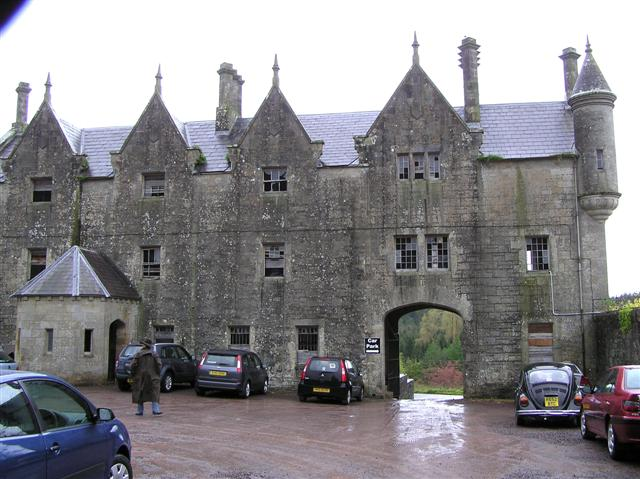
Parkanaur House

Parkanaur House is a Class A listed large Tudor Revival architecture house in the village of Castlecaulfield near Dungannon, County Tyrone, Northern Ireland.

The present house is a two-storey building constructed in the 1840s from block rubble. It has a terraced front with octagonal pinnacles and gables at each projection of the façade, a big bay window and an upper oriel and incorporates an earlier two storey building as an east wing. At the rear is a coach house and free-standing office block.

== History ==
The Parkanaur land, previously owned by the O'Donnelly family, was granted by James I to Toby Caulfeild, 1st Baron Caulfeild in the early 17th century. The property remained in the Caulfeild family until they sold it to Ynyr Burges in 1771. His descendants built Edenfield, a two-storey cottage on the estate. In the 1820s, John Henry Burges moved in and enlarged the cottage. His son, John Ynyr Burges, commissioned architect Thomas Duff to design a new mansion, which was built between 1839 and 1854. Burges names the mansion "Parkanaur".

Parkanaur remained in the Burges family until they moved to England in 1955. It was then bought by American millionaire Thomas Doran. who had emigrated from Castlecaulfield as a teenager. He made Parkanaur available to his friend Rev. Gerry Eakins to develop a new centre for the education of disabled young adults. The house reopened in 1960 as 'The Thomas Doran Training Centre', (Parkanaur College) and much of the house continues today in this role.

The grounds were opened to the public as Parkanaur Forest Park in 1983. They contain a rare herd of white fallow deer.
