= Kilronan Castle =

Castle in County Roscommon, Ireland

Coordinates: 54.065°N 8.187°W

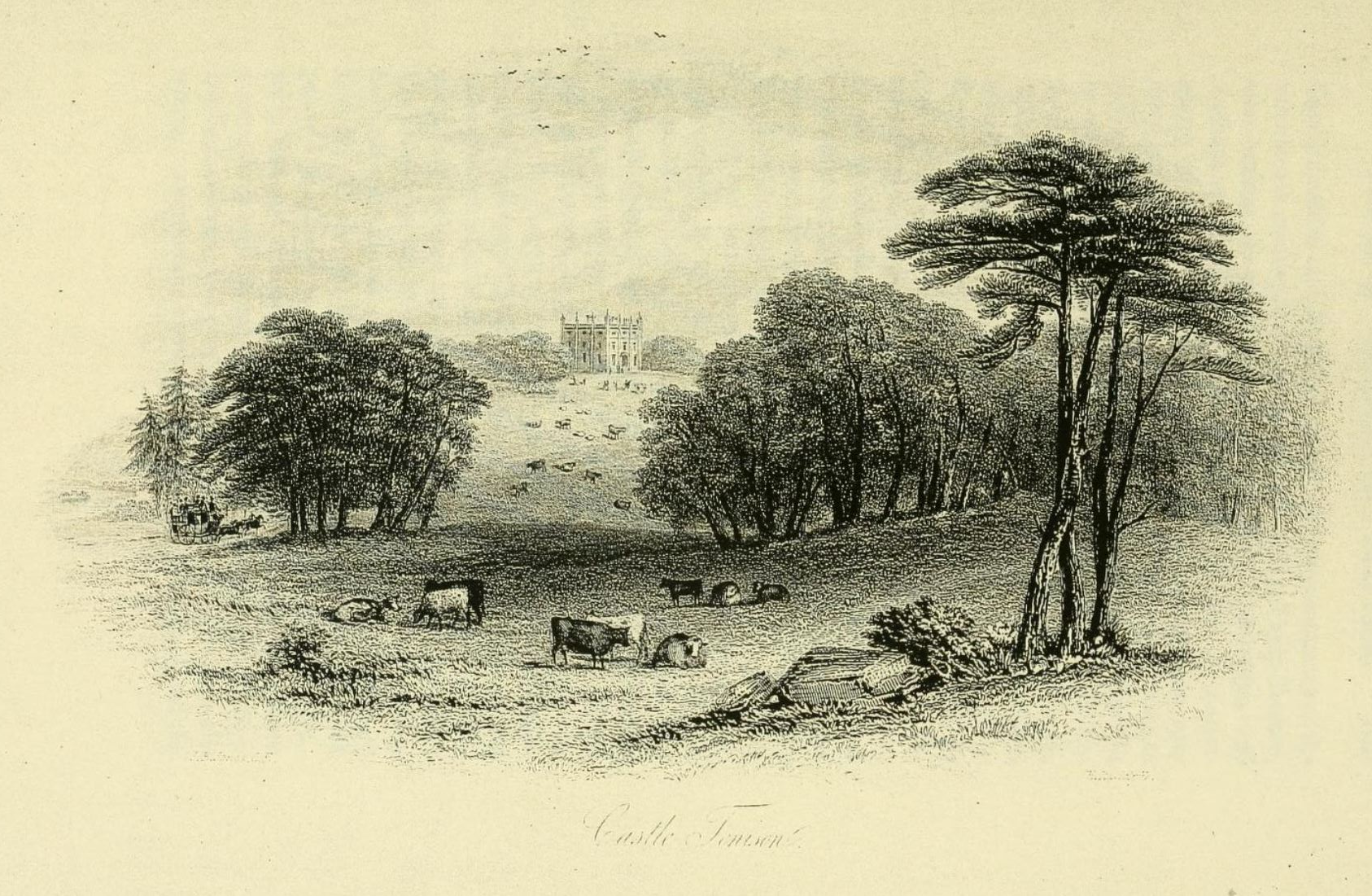
Kilronan Castle County Roscommon 1840s

Kilronan Castle, previously known as Castle Tenison, is a large country house standing in 40 acres (16 ha) of parkland on the shore of Lough Meelagh in County Roscommon, Ireland, 2 kilometres (1.2 mi) from the village of Ballyfarnon.

The house, originally constructed c.1820, was considerably expanded in the 1880s to form the current building. The newer part is a two storey, irregular building with a large baronial tower adjacent to the older building. It now functions as a spa hotel.

== History ==
Towards the end of the 18th century the property later known as Castle Tenison, together with its surrounding estate, belonged to the Dundas family. They sold it in 1715 to Richard Tenison, of the English Tenison family, who was the son of the Bishop of Meath and MP for Dunleer. He died in 1726 and left the property to his son, William, who in 1746 was Lieutenant Colonel of the 35th Regiment of Foot and also an MP for Dunleer. William died shortly afterwards in 1728 without an heir and the estate passed to his uncle Thomas and thence to Thomas' son, Thomas jnr. Thomas jnr was High Sheriff of Leitrim for 1763 and MP for County Monaghan from 1776 to 1783. The property, now known as Kilronan Castle, passed to Thomas jnr's only son, yet another Thomas, who was High Sheriff of Roscommon in 1791, Leitrim in 1792 and MP for Boyle in 1792.

His son Edward King-Tenison was High Sheriff of Leitrim in 1845, MP for Leitrim from 1847 to 1852 and Lord Lieutenant of Roscommon from 1856 to 1878. On his death in 1878 the property was left to his son-in-law Henry King who had changed his name to Henry King-Tenison and inherited his brother's title to become the 8th Earl of Kingston. It was the 8th Earl of Kingston who built the present house in the 1880s as a large Gothic Revival extension to the older building. During his occupation much of the surrounding land was sold.

After his death in 1896 the castle was not often occupied, the 9th Earl preferring to live elsewhere, and in 1939 the contents were sold at auction. The castle was later occupied by a section of the Construction Corps who were building a road in the Arigna Mountains. The Land Commission ultimately acquired the property and later sold the castle to Michael and Brendan Layden. It was subsequently converted into a luxury hotel by the Hanly group in 2006.
