= Bysse =

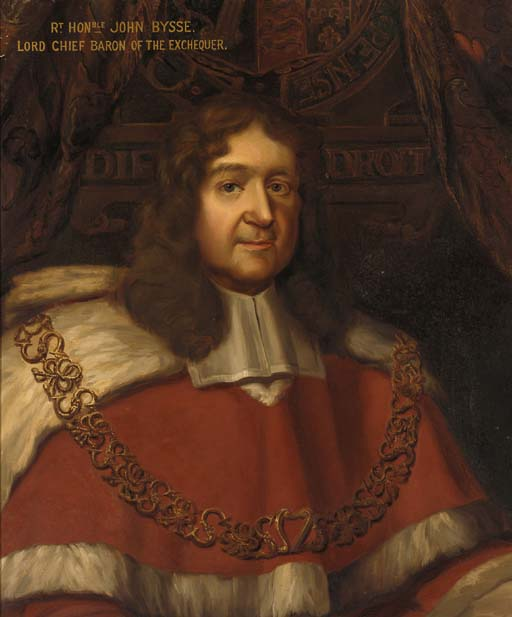
John Bysse, Chief Baron of the Irish Exchequer

The Bysse family were prominent in the Dublin legal world in the sixteenth and seventeenth centuries and were also substantial landowners. Their main seat was Brackenstown House near Swords, and they also had a townhouse at Preston's Inn, on the site of the present-day City Hall. The most notable member of the family was John Bysse (1602?-1680), who became Chief Baron of the Irish Exchequer His father and grandfather had both been officials in the Exchequer of Ireland, and his brother Robert sat in the Irish House of Commons in the 1630s, where he was a leading spokesman for the Royalist party. Through his daughter Judith most of the Bysse property passed to her son Robert Molesworth, 1st Viscount Molesworth.

A portrait of John Bysse, Chief Baron of the Irish Exchequer was painted by James Thornhill.
