= Rathbeale =

Rathbeale Ráth Béil
- Neighbourhood of Swords
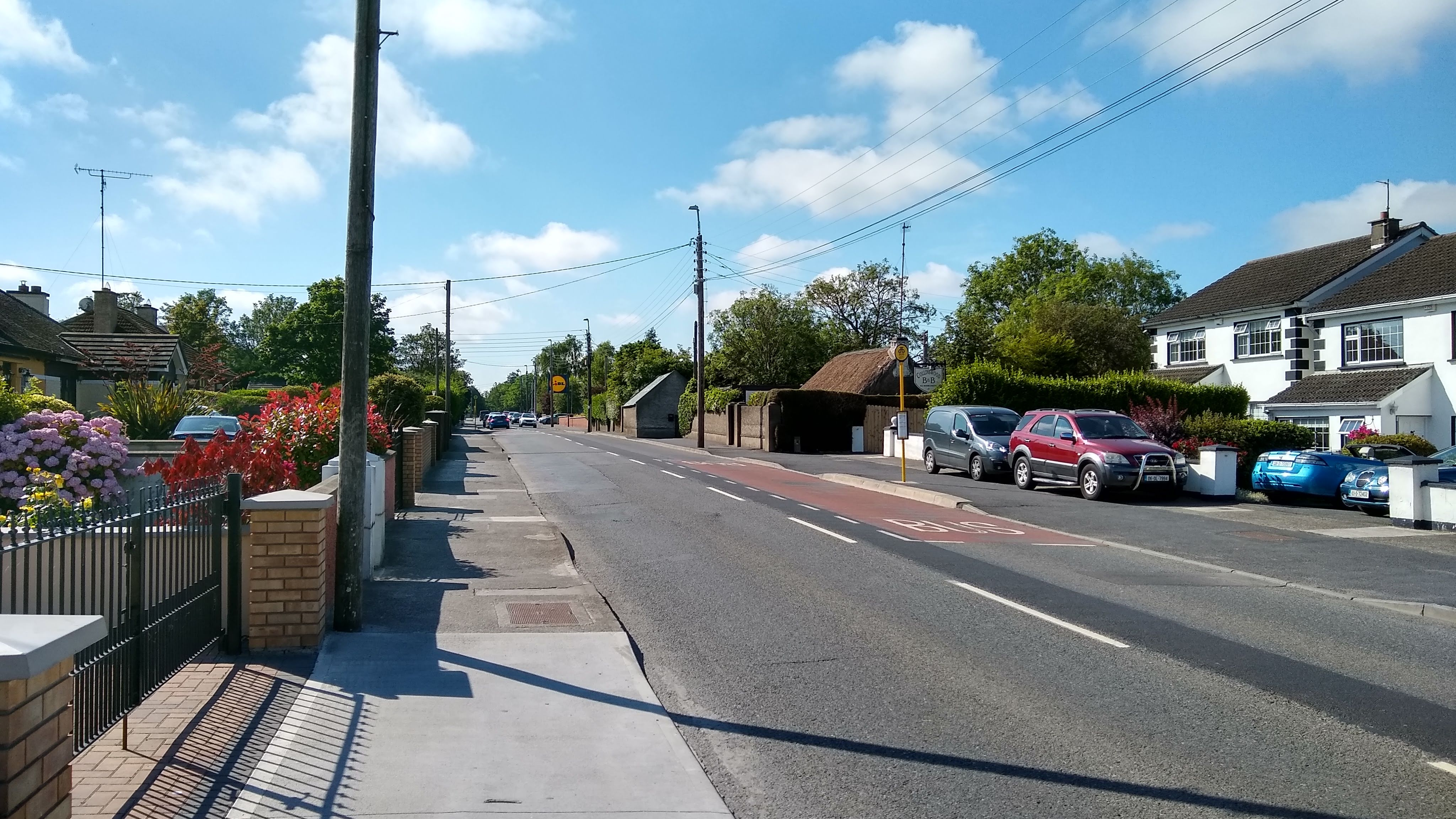
- Rathbeale Road, looking northwest

- Location in Dublin area
- Coordinates: 53°27′44″N 6°13′48″W
- Country: Ireland
- Province: Leinster
- Region: Dublin
- County: Fingal
- Town: Swords

Government
  - Dáil Éireann: Dublin Fingal
  - EU Parliament: Dublin
- Time zone: UTC+0 (WET)
  - Summer (DST): UTC-1 (IST (WEST))
- Area code: +353 (0)1
- Irish Grid Reference: O 174 473

Rathbeale (Irish: Ráth Béil) is a neighbourhood in the town of Swords in Ireland. It developed in west Swords along the Rathbeale Road (R125), which runs from Swords to the townland of Rathbeal. It has been designed around the Rathbeale Road, which has shops, including two supermarkets, with housing estates on either side of the road.

== Layout ==
Rathbeale is located west of the centre of Swords, along the Rathbeale Road. It is on the northside of the Ward River, between the areas of Applewood and Brackenstown. The Rathbeale Road runs through the centre of Rathbeale and there are housing estates on either side of the road.

== Public transport ==
The Rathbeale Road is served by Dublin Bus Routes 41, 41b, and 41x.

Dublin Bus route 41 operates approximately every 20 minutes from Swords Manor to Dublin City Centre (Lwr Abbey Street) through Rathbeale, Swords Village, Dublin Airport, Santry and Drumcondra. Route 41b operates an infrequent service from Rolestown to Dublin City Centre (Lwr Abbey Street) through Rathbeale and Swords Village. At peak times route 41x operates a service to UCD Belfield via Dublin City Centre.

== Amenities ==
Shops on the Rathbeale Road include supermarkets, a department store, a pharmacy, a newsagency and a florist. The public library is also on the Rathbeale Road.
