= Eleanor Palmer =

Eleanor Palmer may refer to:

- Eleanor A. Palmer (1889–1971), the real name of American actress Belle Adair
- Eleanor Palmer (philanthropist) (died 1558), English philanthropist
- Lady Eleanor Palmer (1718/20–1818), Irish Catholic heiress
- Eleanor Palmer, a character on the television program Tooning Out the News
