= Brackenstown =

Neighbourhood of Swords in Ireland

Brackenstown Baile Breacáin
- Suburban area
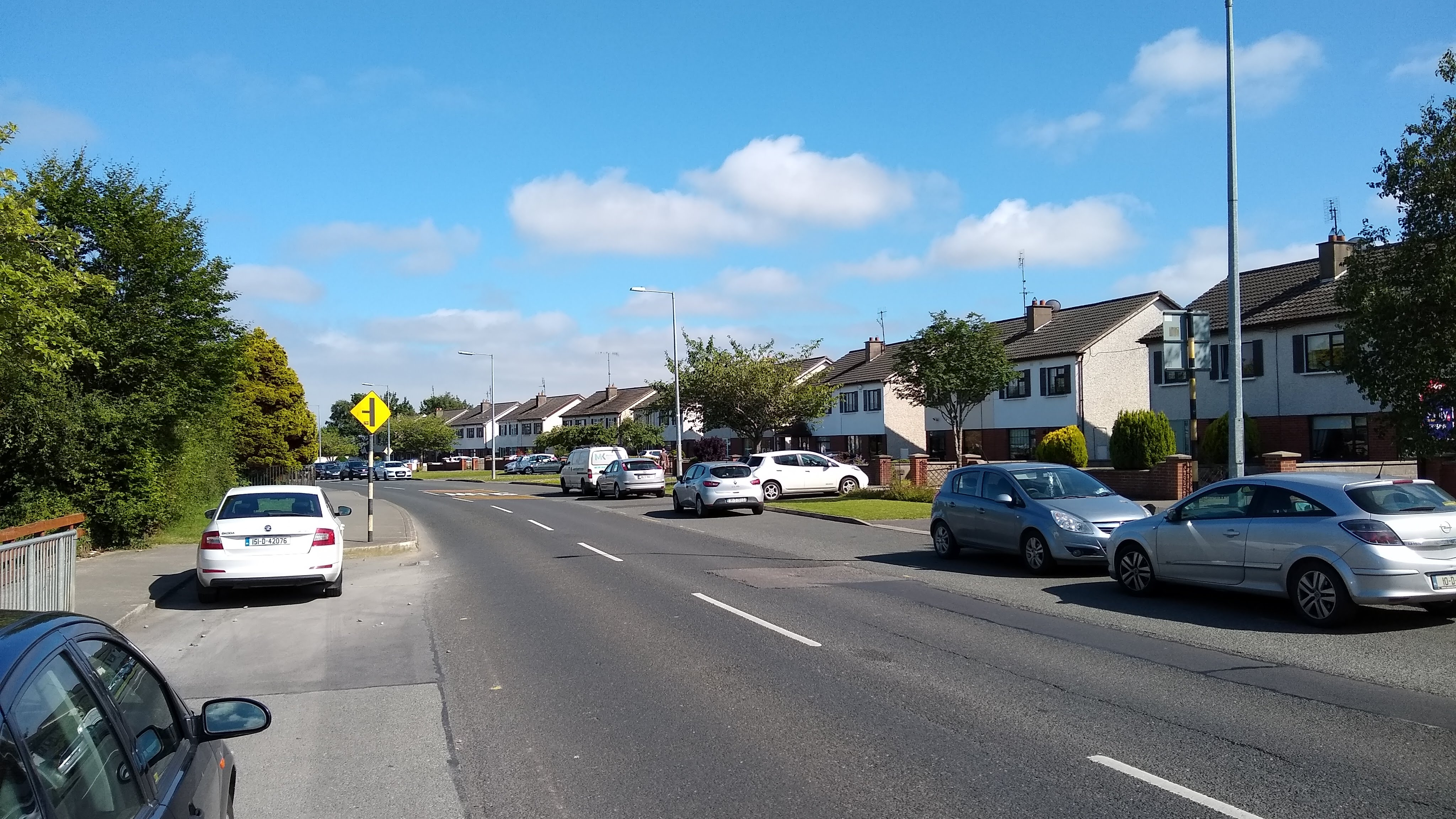
- Brackenstown Road looking southeast

- Location in County Dublin
- Coordinates: 53°27′32″N 6°14′29″W
- Country: Ireland
- Province: Leinster
- Region: Dublin
- County: Fingal

Government
  - Dáil Éireann: Dublin Fingal East
  - EU Parliament: Dublin
- Time zone: UTC+0 (WET)
  - Summer (DST): UTC-1 (IST (WEST))
- Area code: +353 (0)1
- Irish Grid Reference: O 170 470

Brackenstown (Irish: Baile Breacáin) is a neighbourhood in the suburban town of Swords, County Dublin, Ireland. The area has shops, including a supermarket and a pub, and is adjacent to the Ward River Valley Park. Brackenstown is also a parish in the Fingal North deanery of the Roman Catholic Archdiocese of Dublin.

== Development ==
Brackenstown developed in west Swords on the north side of the Ward River. It developed along the Brackenstown Road, which runs from Swords to the townland of Knocksedan. Following the Celtic tiger, and the large expansion of Swords. Brackenstown became surrounded by a new sprawling Dublin suburb, and modernly is a small area located in the major Dublin city suburb of Swords.

== Layout ==
Brackenstown is located west of the centre of Swords, along the Brackenstown Road. It is on the northside of the Ward River, between the neighbourhood of Rathbeale and the Ward River Valley Park. The Brackenstown Road runs east–west through the area and is the main road providing access to the area. The Ward River Valley Park is located on the south side of the road and most of the housing estates are on the north side of the road. Murrough road runs north from Brackenstown to the Rathbeale Road and Applewood.

== Public transport ==
The main bus terminus for western Swords is on the Brackenstown Road outside Swords Manor estate. It is served by Dublin Bus Routes 41, 41c, 41x, 41n and the private Swords Express service. All routes operate from Swords Manor, along the Brackenstown Road, then up Murrough Road to the Rathbeale Road.

Dublin Bus routes 41 & 41c operate approximately every 10 minutes from Swords Manor to Dublin City Centre (Lwr Abbey Street). Route 41 operates via Rathbeale, Swords Village, Dublin Airport, Santry and Drumcondra and route 41c operates via Applewood, Swords Village, Rivervalley, Boroimhe, Sanrty and Drumcondra. At peak times route 41x operates a service to UCD Belfield via Dublin City Centre.

The Swords Express service operates approximately every 30 minutes from Swords Manor to Dublin City Centre (Georges/Eden Quay) via Applewood, Swords Village, Forrest Road, Boroimhe and Holywell, then non-stop via the M1 motorway and Dublin Port Tunnel.

On Friday and Saturday nights the Dublin Bus 41n Nitelink service operates from Dublin City Centre (Westmoreland Street) to Swords Manor via Dublin Airport, Swords Village and Rathbeale.

== Park ==
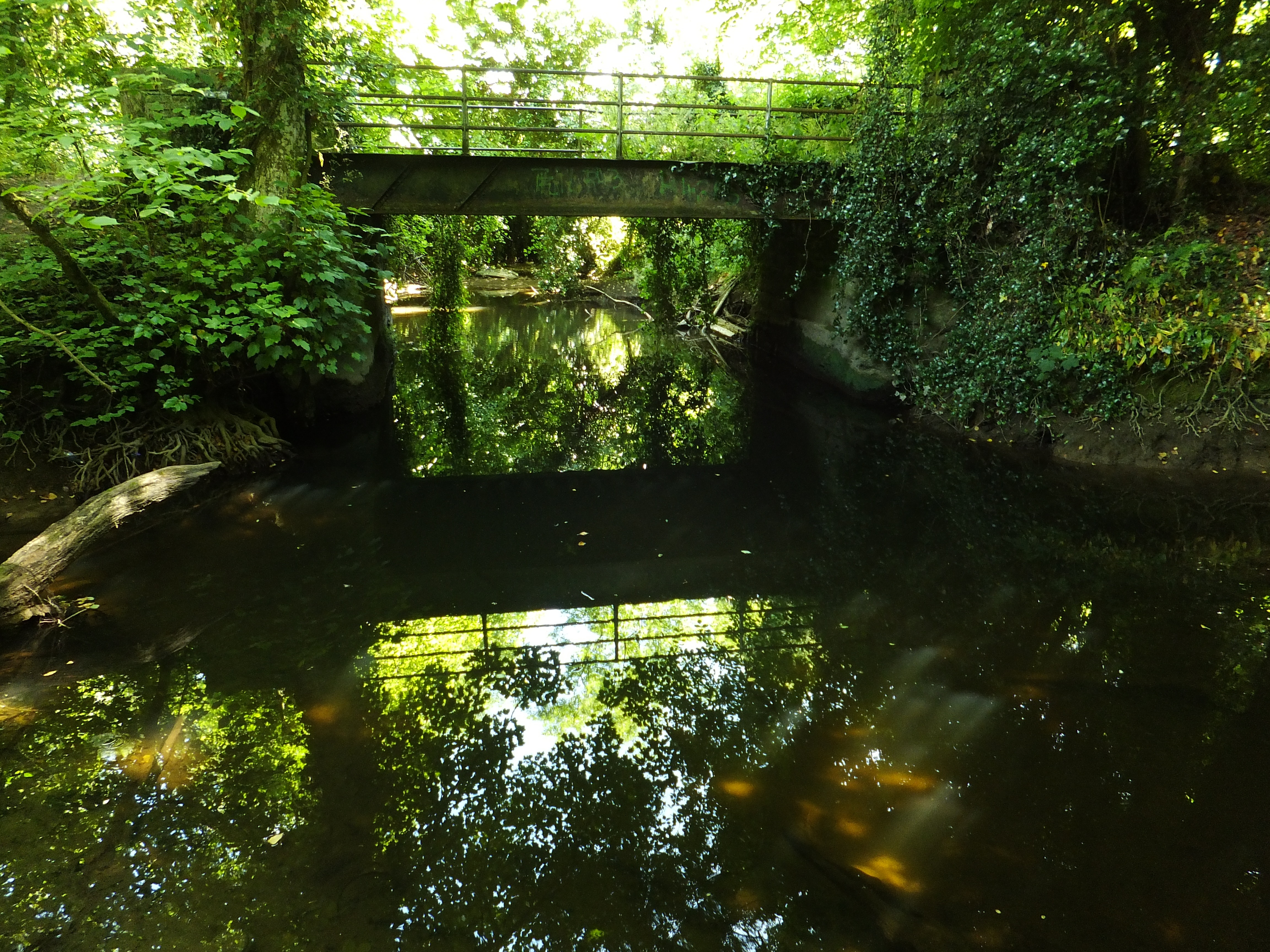
Bridge in Ward River Valley Park

The Ward River Valley Park is a linear park on the banks of the Ward River in the centre of Swords town, between the areas of Brackenstown and River Valley. It covers an area of 89 ha. (220 acres) between Swords Town Centre and Knocksedan Bridge. Its features include ruined 12th-century fortifications, woodland habitats, wetlands and grasslands. There are viewing points, picnic sites, sports pitches and tennis courts.

== Education ==
There are two adjacent primary schools in the Brackenstown area:

- St. Cronan's Junior National School, Brackenstown Road
- St. Cronan's Senior National School, Brackenstown Road

== Amenities ==
The Manor Mall is a small shopping centre on Brackenstown Road with an Asian restaurant, convenience store, credit union, fish and chip shop, hairdressers, pharmacy, and a pub.

Brackenstown has one Roman Catholic church, St. Cronan's Church, which belongs to its own distinct parish.

== Glasmore Abbey ==
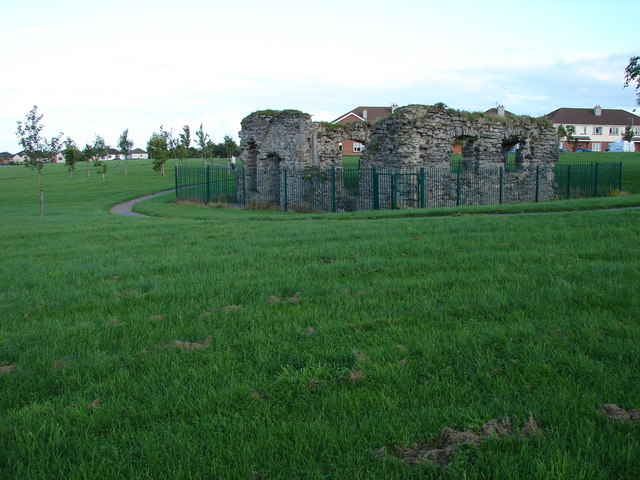
Ruins of Glasmore Abbey

Glassmore Abbey was founded by St Cronan about AD660 – a century later than the founding of Swords. This ruin and its adjacent well are dedicated to St Cronan and are located in a green in the Lioscian estate off Murrough Road. Under the rule of St Cronan, Glasmore Abbey flourished sufficiently to attract the attention of the Northmen of Inbher Domhnainn (Malahide) who raided and destroyed it and slew both the abbot and his entire fraternity in one night. Since then, the abbey has been in ruins.
