= Duncan Smith (Irish politician) =

Irish politician (born 1983)

Duncan Smith TD
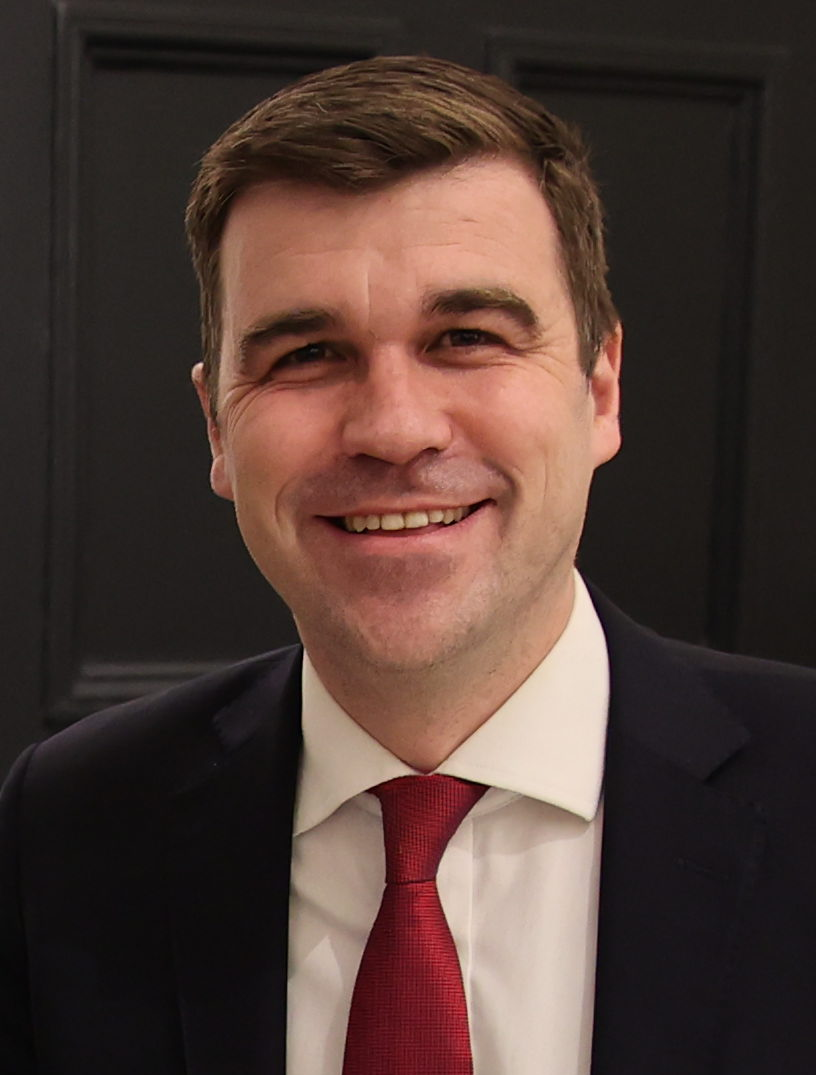
- Smith in 2024

Teachta Dála
- Incumbent
- Assumed office November 2024
- Constituency: Dublin Fingal East
- In office February 2020 – November 2024
- Constituency: Dublin Fingal

Personal details
- Born: 17 May 1983 (age 43) Dublin, Ireland
- Party: Labour Party
- Spouse: Lynsey Smith
- Children: 1
- Education: Dublin City University

Duncan Smith (born 17 May 1983) is an Irish Labour Party politician who has been a Teachta Dála (TD) for the Dublin Fingal East constituency since the 2024 general election, and previously for the Dublin Fingal constituency from 2020 to 2024.

== Political career ==
Smith was a member of Fingal County Council from 2014 to 2020. Smith contested the 2019 Dublin Fingal by-election, receiving 3,821 first preference votes (15.2% of the vote), but was not elected.

At the 2020 general election, Smith was elected as a TD for Dublin Fingal. After his election to the Dáil, James Humphreys was co-opted to Smith's seat on Fingal County Council. He was one of two TDs to nominate Alan Kelly for the position of Labour Party leader in the 2020 leadership election.

In 2021, Smith received media attention for criticising Michael and Danny Healy-Rae in the Dáil, after the two TDs had accused Labour of being "anti-worker" after proposing a zero-COVID strategy, accusing the Healy-Raes of coming from a background of "Fianna Fáil privilege and millions and millions of euros" and "pretending to be working class." He received praise from Miriam Lord for this, being dubbed a "working-class hero" in her column.

Smith was the Labour Party Director of Elections for Ivana Bacik in the 2021 Dublin Bay South by-election.

At the 2024 general election, Smith was re-elected to the Dáil in Dublin Fingal East.

== Personal life ==
Smith's father was a carpenter by profession. He went to secondary school at Mount Temple Comprehensive School. Smith studied at Dublin City University, completing a bachelor's degree in business studies and a master's degree in International Security and Conflict Resolution. He is currently studying for a PhD in nuclear disarmament studies.

He is married to Lynsey, and they have one son.

Dáil	Election	Deputy (Party)	Deputy (Party)	Deputy (Party)	Deputy (Party)	Deputy (Party)
32nd	2016	Louise O'Reilly (SF)	Clare Daly (I4C)	Brendan Ryan (Lab)	Darragh O'Brien (FF)	Alan Farrell (FG)
32nd	2019 by-election	Louise O'Reilly (SF)	Joe O'Brien (GP)	Brendan Ryan (Lab)	Darragh O'Brien (FF)	Alan Farrell (FG)
33rd	2020	Louise O'Reilly (SF)	Joe O'Brien (GP)	Duncan Smith (Lab)	Darragh O'Brien (FF)	Alan Farrell (FG)
34th	2024	Constituency abolished. See Dublin Fingal East and Dublin Fingal West.				

Dáil	Election	Deputy (Party)	Deputy (Party)	Deputy (Party)
34th	2024	Darragh O'Brien (FF)	Duncan Smith (Lab)	Ann Graves (SF)
