= National Show Centre =

Irish venue in Dublin

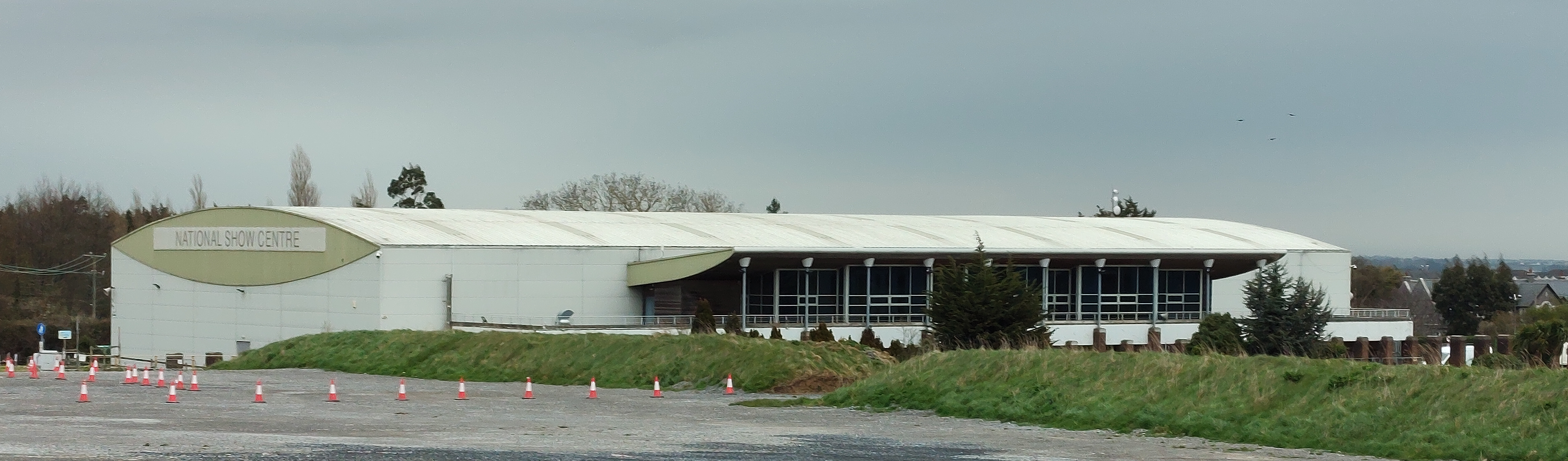
- View from south
- Interactive map of National Show Centre
- Coordinates: 53.43685°N 6.22508°W

Website
- https://www.nationalshowcentre.ie/

The National Show Centre is a venue for exhibitions and events near Dublin Airport and Swords (the county town of Fingal) in north County Dublin.

In 2007 Mata Amritanandamayi, known as 'the hugging saint', held a meeting there at which she hugged followers.

In August 2013 Dublin Comic Con was held in the centre.

== COVID-19 use ==
The centre was used for COVID-19 testing from 21 to 30 March 2020. It was closed as there was sufficient capacity in Croke Park.

In July 2020 it was used to immunise students from Junior Infants and first year primary school students as part of the Immunisation Programme for School Aged Children, which had been put on hold because of COVID-19.

In July 2021 the Health Service Executive announced that it was relocating the mass vaccination centre in The Helix in Dublin City University and to the National Show Centre as DCU was preparing for students to return in September.
