= Bus Éireann Route 101 =

Bus route in Ireland

101
- Dublin to Drogheda

Overview
- System: Transport for Ireland
- Operator: Bus Éireann

Route
- Locale: Dublin City, Fingal, Meath, Louth
- Communities served: Swords, Balbriggan
- Landmarks served: Dublin Airport
- Start: Busáras
- Via: Swords Road
- End: Drogheda Bus Station
- Length: 50.7 km (31.5 mi)
- Other routes: 101X, 100X

Service
- Level: Daily
- Frequency: every 20 - 30 minutes peak, once per hour off peak
- Journey time: Varying between 68 minutes during the night to 126 minutes in peak hours
- Operates: 24 hr

Bus Éireann Route 101 is a bus route in Ireland, that runs from Talbot Street, in Dublin city centre, to the Bus Station in the town of Drogheda, via Swords, Balbriggan and Julianstown. It is operated by Bus Éireann and is the main bus route connecting Drogheda to Dublin. Routes 101X and 100X are peak time express services using the Dublin Port Tunnel and M1 motorway. In 2023 the 101 route was upgraded to a full 24-hour service from Sunday May 7, with 293 departures targeted per week. The new timetable is operated by Bus Eireann and includes a fleet of new, fully accessible double and single deck coaches on the route.

== Route ==
=== 101 ===
Route 101 operates every 20 – 30 minutes from Talbot Street in Dublin City Centre to Drogheda Bus Station. It runs along the Swords Quality Bus Corridor, via Gardiner Street, Dorset Street, Drumcondra Road Lower, Drumcondra Road Upper, Swords Road, Dublin Airport, Dublin Road (Swords), Swords Bypass, Lissenhall, Blakes Cross, Balrothery, Dublin Street (Balbriggan), Bridge Street (Balbriggan), Drogheda Street (Balbriggan), Gormanston Cross, Julianstown and Dublin Road (Drogheda), utilising the R132 road for a large portion of its journey.

=== 101X & 100X ===
Route 101X is a peak time express service from Wilton Terrace in Dublin city centre to Termon Abbey, north of Drogheda. Services operate via Baggot Street Lower, Pembroke Street, Leeson Street, Dawson Street, Suffolk Street, Westmoreland Street, Eden Quay, North Wall Quay, Dublin Port Tunnel, M1 motorway, Balrothery, then follow the same route as the 101 as far as Drogheda Bus Station and continues out to Termon Abbey.

Route 100X is an hourly express service from Wilton Terrace in Dublin city centre to Long Walk in Dundalk. It follows the same route as the 101X as far as the Dublin Port Tunnel, then operates via M1 motorway, Dublin Airport, M1 motorway, Drogheda Bus Station, M1 motorway, Dundalk I.T. and Long Walk, Dundalk. Some services also serve Dunleer and Castlebellingham.
