= Swords Pavilions =

Suburban shopping centre in Swords, near Dublin, Ireland

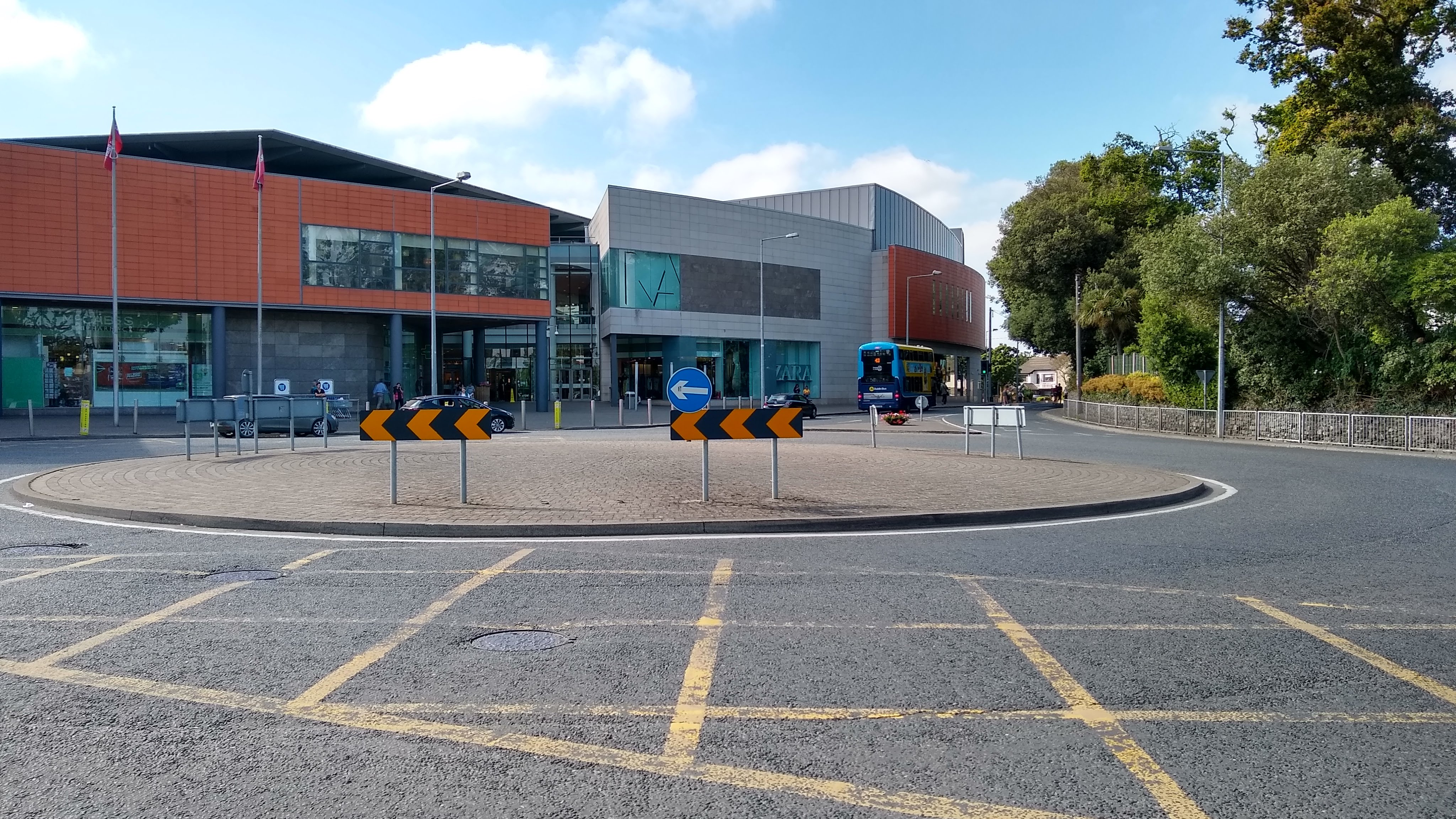
- Swords Pavilions exterior
- Location: Swords, County Dublin, Ireland
- Opened: May 15, 2001; 25 years ago
- Manager: Ian Hunter
- Owner: Hammerson/Great-west Lifeco
- Num. of stores: 90+
- Floors: 2 shopping floors, 5 parking floors
- Website: pavilions.ie

Swords Pavilions is a shopping centre in Swords, County Dublin, Ireland. The centre contains over 112 shops, restaurants and cafes, as well as the 11 screen Movies@Swords cinema, and has over 2,000 surface and multi-storey parking spaces. The centre is owned by Hammerson and Great-west Lifeco.

== Tenants and services ==
The centre is home to stores such as Dunnes Stores, H&M, Zara, River Island, SuperValu, Easons, Boots, Rituals and TK Maxx. There is a range of car parks, a cinema and a post office, and there are several restaurants and cafes such as Five Guys, Subway, Abrakebabra, Chopped, Starbucks, Butlers Chocolate Café, Costa and Milano.

== History ==
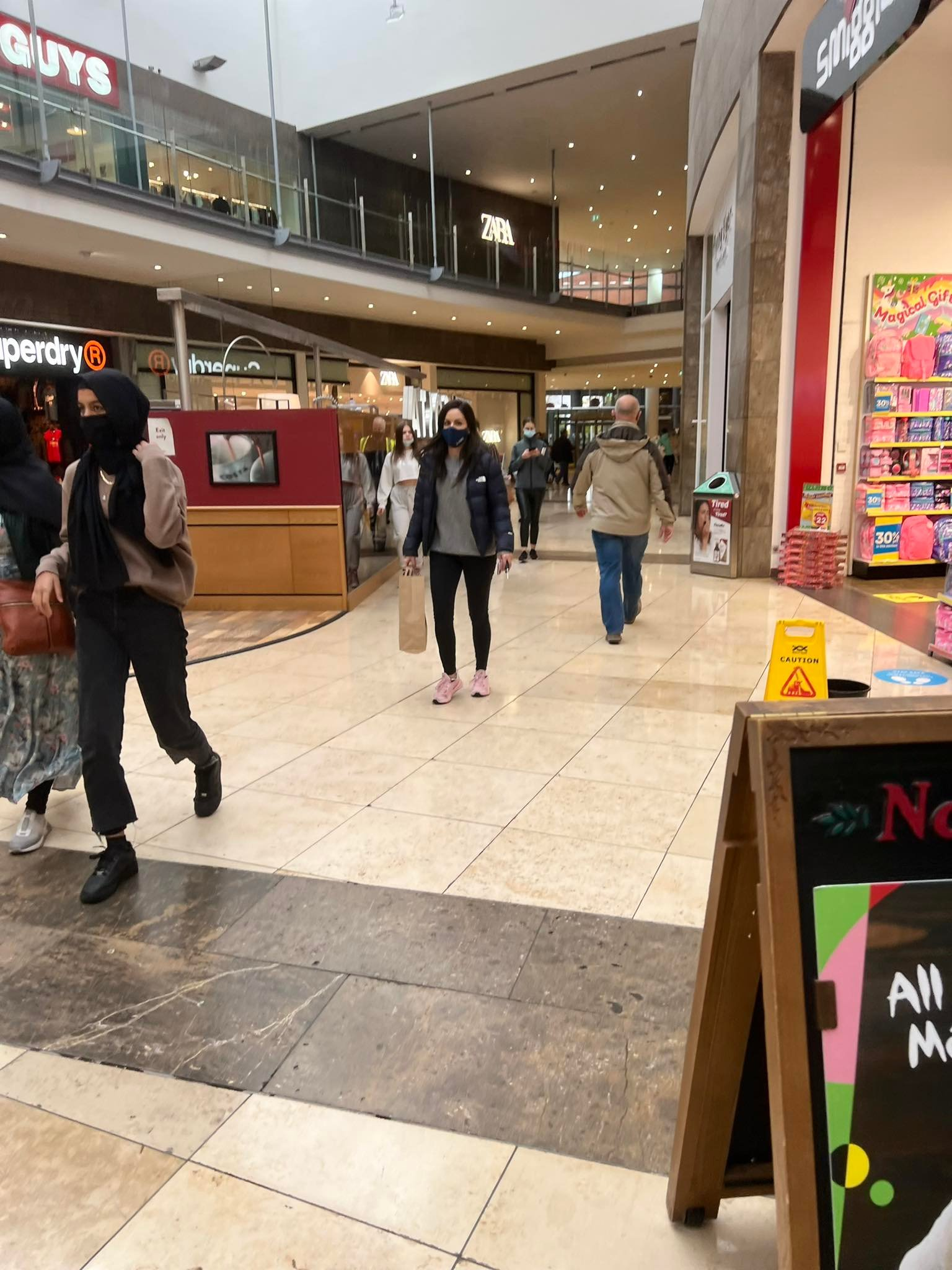
Concourse area of Swords Pavilions

In 1996, a planning application was sent to Fingal County Council for a commercial complex to be built on a 20-acre site between the Main Street and the Swords by-pass road. Construction work was meant to start in the middle of 1997 with an opening in the autumn of 1998, however construction did not begin until 1999. The Pavilions was eventually opened on the 15 May 2001, by then Taoiseach Bertie Ahern.

=== Expansion ===
In 2006, the Movies@Swords cinema opened. Additionally, in the same year, Phase 2 of the center was inaugurated, introducing retailers like Penneys. There are proposed plans for a Phase 3, situated at the front of the center, adjacent to the Swords metro stop on the R132. However, Phase 3 has been put on hold until further notice.

In June 2018, plans for a €3.3 million development were announced which would reconfigure the first floor of Phase 2 to accommodate 3 new restaurant units where two of the units would be occupied by Five Guys and Milano. The development would also include a glass bridge that will link the first floor of the centre.
