= Knocksedan =

Townland in County Dublin, Ireland

Knocksedan Cnoc Siáin
- Townland of Swords
- Location in Ireland
- Coordinates: 53°27′22″N 6°15′42″W
- Country: Ireland
- Province: Leinster
- Region: Dublin
- County: Fingal
- Town: Swords

Government
  - Dáil constituency: Dublin Fingal East
  - EU Parliament: Dublin
- Time zone: UTC+0 (WET)
  - Summer (DST): UTC-1 (IST (WEST))
- Area code: +353 (0)1
- Irish grid reference: O152460

Knocksedan (Irish: Cnoc Siáin, meaning 'hill of the fairy mound') is a townland near the town of Swords, County Dublin in Ireland. It is situated along the Naul Road (R108) to the west of Swords on either side of the Ward River. In advance of the 1916 Easter Rising, Knocksedan was muster point for the Fingal battalion of the Irish Volunteers.

== History ==
The area around Knocksedan is recorded as being inhabited from prehistoric times and there are various mounds and castles dated to at least the 12th century which are still visible above ground. One of the most notable buildings in the area is Knocksedan House which was constructed around 1760 in what was then rural County Dublin.

Later one of the last acts of the Irish parliament before the Acts of Union 1800 was to amend the road to Knocksedan (40 Geo. 3. c. 48 (I)).

== Housing ==
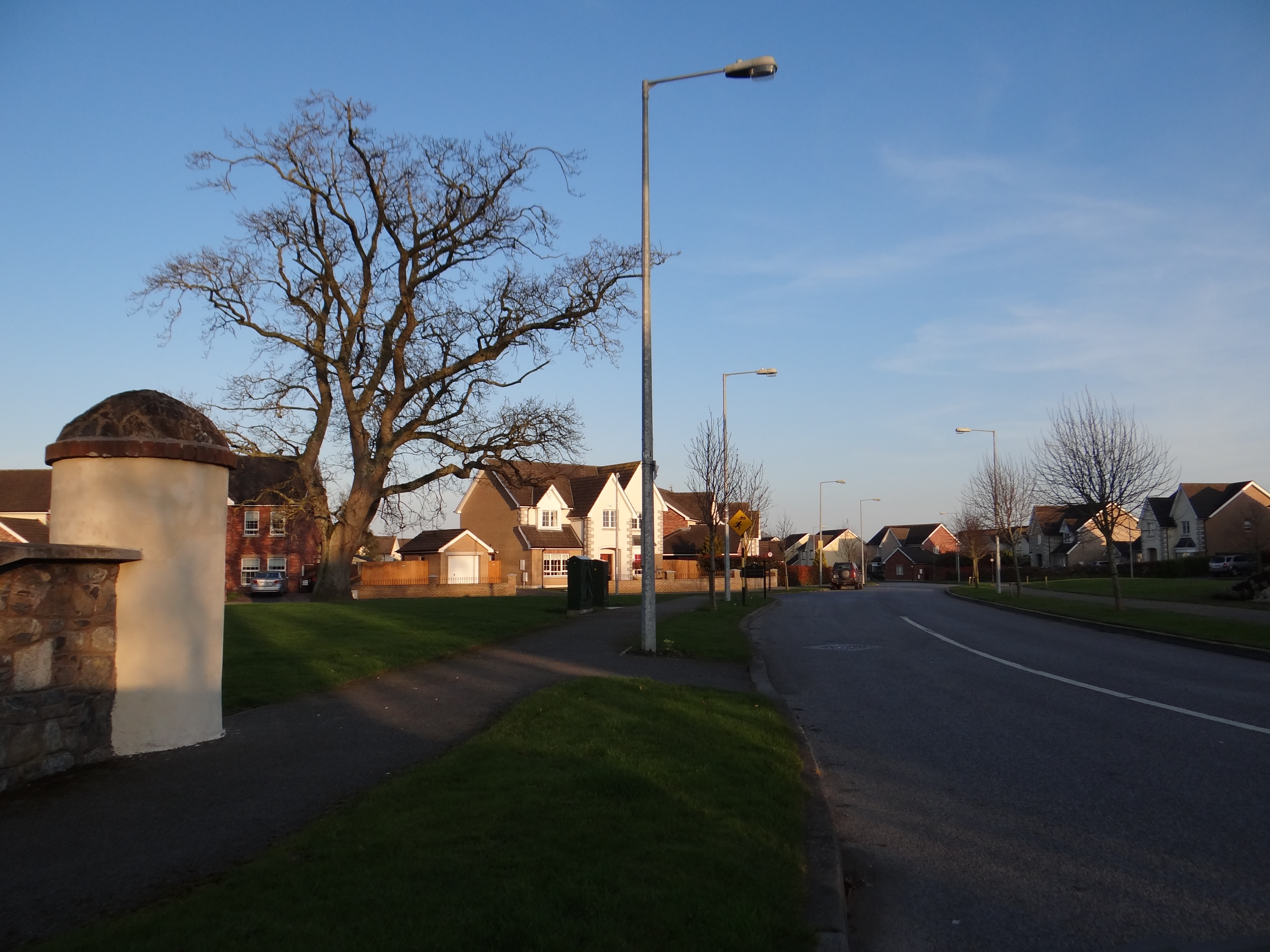
Knocksedan Demesne

Knocksedan Demesne is a housing estate on the east side of the Naul Road. In January 2017, the 41X Dublin Bus route began a service from Knocksedan after campaigning from local residents. A Local Link bus, provided by Flexibus Local Link, also provides limited services between Knocksedan and Swords Pavilions. A planning application for the second phase of Knocksedan Demesne involved permission for 191 additional houses. Construction of the second phase of Knocksedan Demesne began in July 2014.

== Heliport ==
Knocksedan Heliport is located on the west side on the Naul Road. It is run by Celtic Helicopters, which was founded in 1985, and has four hangars. Irish Helicopters also use the heliport. They provide aerial crane, aerial filming, aerial survey, charter, maintenance and other services.

== Park ==
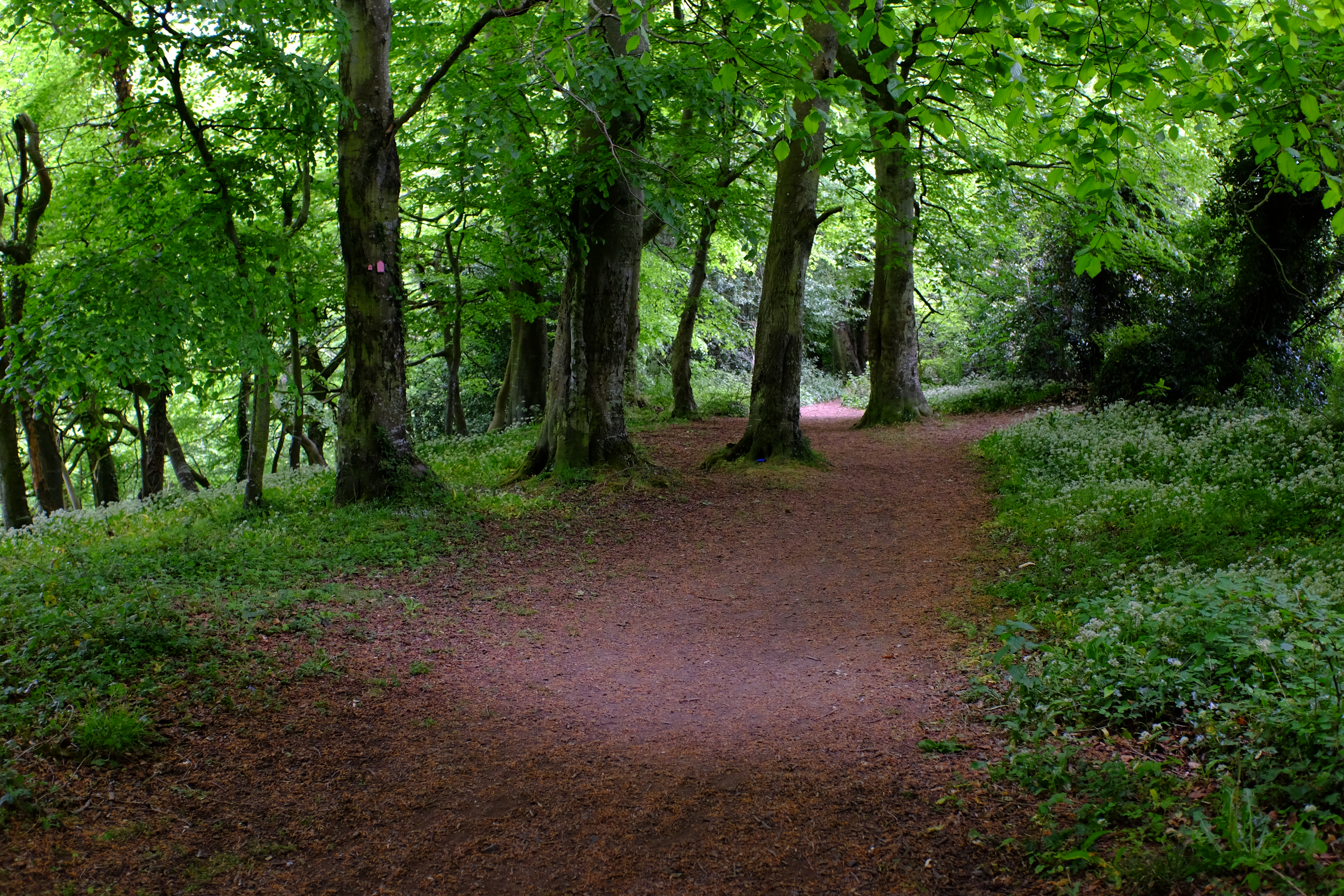
Ward River Valley Park

The Ward River Valley Park is a large linear park on the banks of the Ward River. It covers an area of 89 ha. (220 acres) between Swords Town Centre and Knocksedan Bridge. Its features include the ruins of 12th-century fortifications, including a motte and bailey, woodland habitats, wetlands and grasslands. There are several picnic sites, sports pitches and tennis courts.
