= Applewood, Swords =

Neighbourhood of Swords, County Dublin, Ireland

Applewood Irish: Coill na nÚll
- Suburban area
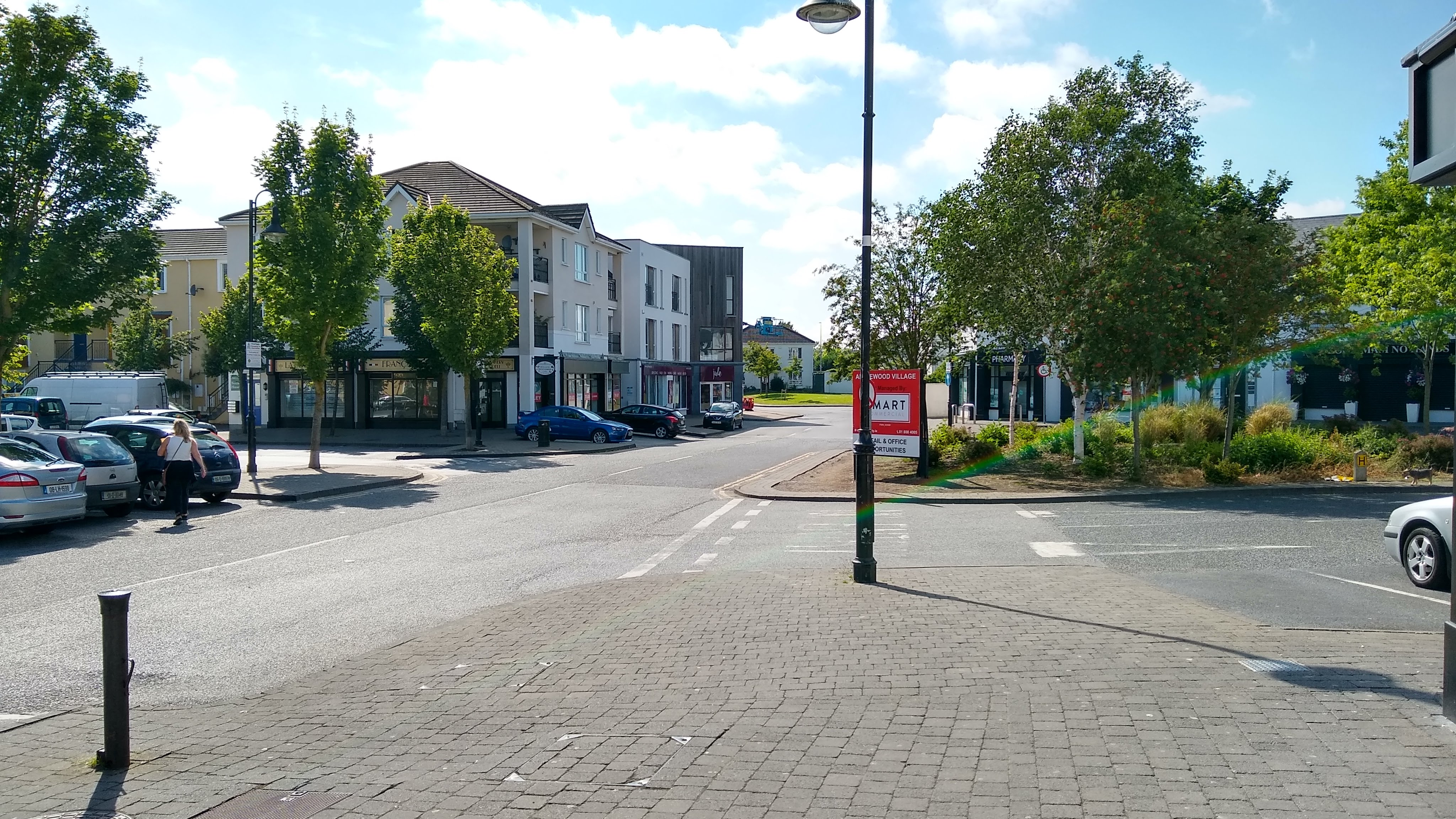
- Main Street

- Location in Dublin area
- Coordinates: 53°28′16″N 6°13′57″W
- Country: Ireland
- Province: Leinster
- Region: Dublin
- County: County Dublin
- Town: Swords
- Built from: c. 2002

Government
  - Dáil constituency: Dublin Fingal East
  - EP constituency: Dublin
  - Local authority: Fingal County Council
- Time zone: UTC+0 (WET)
  - Summer (DST): UTC-1 (IST (WEST))
- Area code: +353 (0)1
- Irish Grid Reference: O 174 483

Applewood (Irish: Coill na nÚll) is a neighbourhood in the suburban town of Swords, County Dublin, Ireland. It was built around the year 2002 by property developer Gerry Gannon. It has been designed "village-style" with shops in the centre and housing estates surrounding this. In 2006, it won a special "Urban Village Award" at the National Tidy Towns competition.

== Layout ==
Applewood is located north-west of the centre of Swords. The Glen Ellan Distributor Road is the main road providing access to the area. It starts at the Balheary Road and runs west as far as the Applewood Roundabout, then turns south to end at the Rathbeale Road at Outlands Cross. The Rathbeale Road provides access into the centre of Swords and the Balheary Road provides access onto the R132 dual carriageway. The South Bank, Glen Ellan and Sandford Wood estates are on the south side of the Glen Ellan Road while Applewood Main Street, and the Applewood, Braeburn, Bramley and Thornleigh Estates are on the north side of the road. The Jugback estate is on both sides of the road.

An extension of the Glen Ellan Road runs west from the Applewood Roundabout into the Oldtown "future development lands" and provides access into the Brides Glen and Bunbury Gate estates and to the Swords Educate Together National School, Gaelscoil Bhrian Bóroimhe and Applewood Community Centre. Another unnamed distributor road runs north from the Applewood roundabout to the Broadmeadow Linear Park and provides access to the Ashton and Castleview Estates.

== Public transport ==
Applewood (Glen Ellan Road) is served by Dublin Bus Routes 41c, 41x & 43 and the Swords Express service.

Dublin Bus route 41c operates approximately every 20 minutes from Swords Manor to Dublin City Centre (Lower Abbey Street) through Applewood, Swords Village, River Valley, Santry and Drumcondra. At peak times, route 41x operates a service to UCD Belfield via Dublin City Centre and route 43 operates a service to Dublin City Centre via Kinsealy and the Malahide Road.

The Swords Express service runs approximately every 30 minutes from Swords Manor to Dublin City Centre (Georges/Eden Quay) through Applewood, Swords Village and Holywell, then express via the M1 motorway and Port Tunnel.

== Parks ==
The Broadmeadow Linear Park is a small park north of Applewood along the Broadmeadow River. Fingal County Council plan to extend the park eastwards to Balheary Park and westwards into the proposed Swords Regional Park.

Balheary Park is east of Applewood at the confluence of the Broadmeadow River and the Ward River. It surrounds Swords Business Campus on three sides and has some playing pitches which are used by St. Colmcille's GAA club. In mid-2006, Fingal County Council built a skatepark and adjoining basketball courts/football court in Balheary Park.

The Fingal Council Local Area Plan (2005–2011) proposed a new 65 hectares (160 acres) regional park for Swords. If developed as planned, it would be located north-east of Applewood, stretching from the Rathbeale Road to the Broadmeadow River.

== Education ==
There are three primary schools in the Applewood area:

- Gaelscoil Bhrian Bóroimhe, Glen Ellan Distributor Road Extension
- Swords Educate Together National School, Glen Ellan Distributor Road Extension
- Thornleigh Educate Together National School, Applewood

Gaelscoil Bhrian Bóroimhe and Swords Educate Together National School share the same campus with Applewood Community Centre. The two 16 classroom schools and community centre campus opened in 2011. The Thornleigh Educate Together 18 classroom school opened in 2012.
