= Eleanor Ambrose =

- Born: c. 1718/20
- Died: 19 February 1818; Henry Street, Dublin
- Other name: Eleanor Palmer

Lady Eleanor Palmer née Ambrose (1718/20–1818) was a celebrated beauty and Catholic heiress.

== Life ==
Her father, Michael Ambrose, was well-educated but bared from several professions by his religion. He became a brewer and made his fortune. He resided at Ambrose Hall, Swords, County Dublin. Her mother was the daughter of fellow Dublin brewer, Richard Archbold.

Ambrose rose to prominence when the new lord lieutenant of Ireland, Philip Stanhope, 4th Earl of Chesterfield, became enamoured with her despite her being described as "beautiful, witty, intellectual and a fervent patriot". During the Viceroyalty of Stanhope, along with her sister Clara, Ambrose became a prominent socialite. She also accompanied Stanhope to all official ceremonies. Having been influenced by Ambrose, Stanhope reportedly told George II that "poverty not Popery was to be feared in Ireland", he had found "only one dangerous papist, the brightness of whose eyes and charms, and whose conversation were indeed dangerous" in reference to Ambrose. However, Eleanor ensured the relationship stayed platonic.

"At one of the Castle balls, given on the anniversary of the battle of the Boyne, she appeared with an orange lily in her breast, upon which Chesterfield improvised the following lines:

"Say, lovely tory, where's the jest
Of wearing orange on thy breast,
When that same breast uncovered shows
The whiteness of the rebel rose?"

Following Stanhope taking a leave of absence from Ireland in March 1746, Ambrose married Roger Palmer of Castle Lackin, County Mayo (created baronet 1777) on 10 October 1750. The couple had three sons, Francis, John Roger (second baronet), and William Henry (third baronet).

After the death of her husband in 1790, she moved to a small lodgings on Henry Street, Dublin. When she was visited by Richard Lalor Sheil, he reported "that almost everything she said was ripe with sedition." She died at her home in on 19 February 1818, aged either 98 or 100, "retaining to the last a vehement hatred of the wrongs under which her Catholic fellow-countrymen laboured."

== See also ==
- Palmer Baronets
- Mary Barber
