= Swords, County Dublin =

Commuter town north of Dublin, Ireland

Swords Sord / Sord Cholmcille (Irish)
- Suburban town
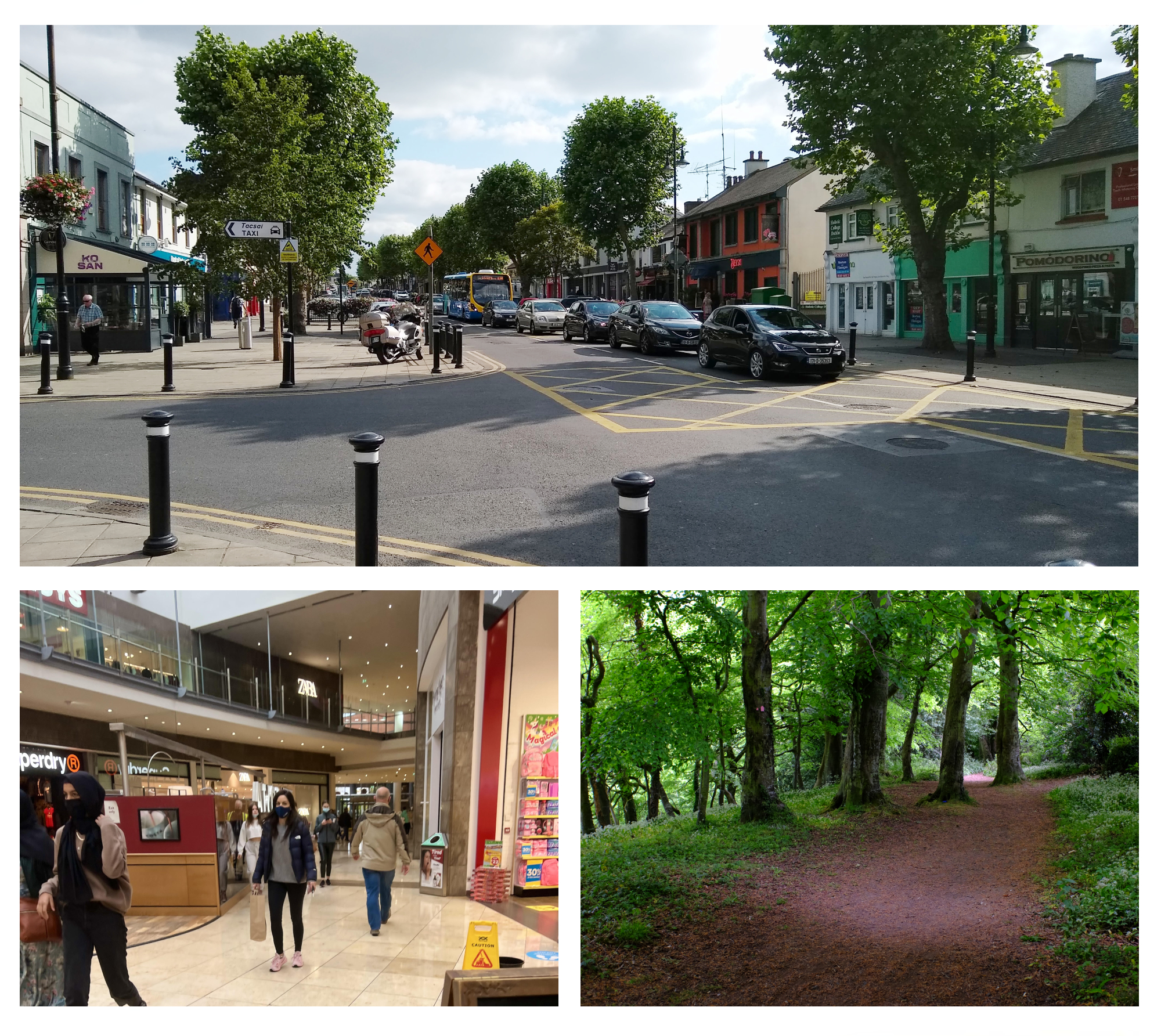
- Clockwise from top: Main Street, Swords; Ward River Valley Park; interior of Swords Pavilions

- Location in Dublin area Swords (Ireland)
- Coordinates: 53°27′37″N 6°13′12″W
- Country: Ireland
- Province: Leinster
- Region: Eastern and Midland
- County: County Dublin
- Local government area: Fingal
- Founded: 560
- County town: 1994
- Founder: St Colmcille
- Named for: (possibly) St Colmcille's Well
- County Hall: Main Street, Swords
- Electoral divisions: List: Swords–Lissenhall; Swords–Glasmore; Swords–Forrest; Swords Village; Swords–Seatown; Swords–Manor; Holy well; Applewood; Brackenstown; Cloghran; Airport

Government
  - Type: Local authority
  - Body: Fingal County Council
  - EP constituency: Dublin
  - Dáil constituency: Dublin Fingal East
  - Local electoral areas: Swords; Howth—Malahide

Area
  - Urban: 11.35 km^{2} (4.38 sq mi)
  - Metro: 15.99 km^{2} (6.17 sq mi)
- Source: CSO Sapmap Viewer
- Highest elevation: 60 m (200 ft)
- Lowest elevation: 0 m (0 ft)

Population (2022)
  - Rank: 8th
  - Urban: 40,776
  - Urban density: 3,615/km^{2} (9,360/sq mi)

Ethnic or cultural background
  - White Irish: 30,946
  - White Other: 7,089
  - Asian or Asian Irish: 1,169
  - Black or Black Irish: 1,142
  - White Irish Traveller: 96
- Time zone: UTC0 (WET)
  - Summer (DST): UTC+1 (WEST)
- Postal Hub: K67
- Postal Sorting Office: SWORDS
- Dialing Code: +353(0)1
- Geocode: O184469
- ISO 3166 code: IE-D
- Vehicle registration: D
- Website: Swords on fingal.ie

Swords (Irish: Sord [sˠoːɾˠd̪ˠ] or Sord Cholmcille) in County Dublin, the county town of the local government area of Fingal, is a large suburban town on the east coast of Ireland, situated ten kilometres north of Dublin city centre. It is the eighth largest urban area in Ireland, with a population of 40,776 as of the 2022 census. The town was reputedly founded c. AD 560. Located on the Ward River, Swords features Swords Castle, a restored medieval castle, a holy well from which it takes its name, a round tower and a Norman tower. Facilities in the area include the Pavilions shopping centre, one of the largest in the Dublin region, a range of civic offices, some light industries, the main storage facility and archive of the National Museum of Ireland and several parks. Dublin Airport is located nearby.

The name "Swords" gives its name to a townland of Swords Demesne, a civil parish, and a local electoral area.

== History ==
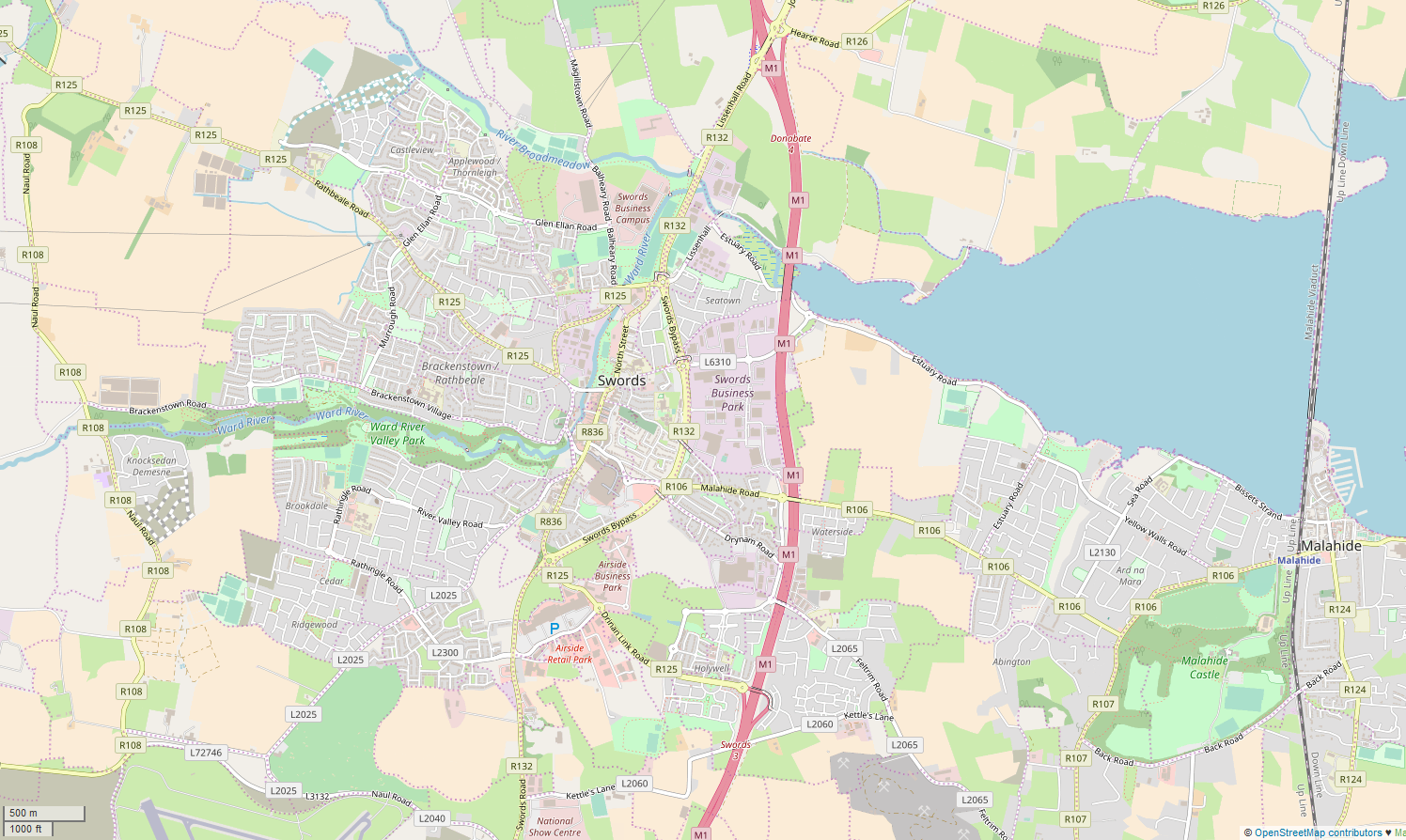
Map of Swords

=== Origins and etymology ===
The town's origins date back to 560 AD when it was reputedly founded by Saint Colmcille (521–567). Legend has it that the saint blessed a local well, giving the settlement its name, Sord, meaning "clear" or "pure". However, An Sord also means "the water source" and could indicate a large communal drinking well that existed in antiquity. St. Colmcille's Well is located on Well Road off Main Street. Sord may also refer to a "sward", an "expanse of grass". The most common landscape indicators of early Christian settlement are the ecclesiastical enclosures, and in the case of Swords, the street pattern has been influenced by the circular alignment of the settlement.

=== Development ===
The medieval town developed in a linear pattern along Main Street, in a roughly north–south direction. The round tower, 26m in height, is also an indicator of early Christian settlement. The Irish high king Brian Boru is said to have had his Requiem Mass offered at the church on Spittal Hill after he was killed at the Battle of Clontarf; this was of course before the hospital and even the Church of Ireland when there would have been a small chapel there along with the round tower.

In medieval times, the manor of Swords was English Crown property, and by tradition was granted to each Archbishop of Dublin for his lifetime.

The parliamentary borough of Swords elected two MPs to the Irish House of Commons. It was disenfranchised in 1801 by the Acts of Union 1800.

The population at the time of the 1841 census was 1,788 inhabitants.

At the northern end of the street stands Swords Castle, 200m northeast of the ecclesiastical site, which was built in the early 13th century. A short distance north of the castle is the elevation known as Spittal Hill, where a hospital once stood.

In 1994, Swords became the county town of the new county of Fingal after the abolition of County Dublin as an administrative county. In 2001, upon the completion of the County Hall, senior executive offices moved there from Parnell Square in Dublin city centre.

In June 2006, the RNLI Ireland officially opened a new all-Ireland headquarters at Airside Business Park, within greater Swords. The National Museum of Ireland operates its Collections Resource Centre (CRC) at a former Motorola factory site on the northern edge of the town. The size of two football fields, the CRC includes storage, archive, library and research facilities serving all branches of the museum.

=== Strategic vision ===
Fingal County Council's "Strategic Vision" for Swords declared an aim of forming a sustainable "new city"; the council has referred to Swords as an "emerging city" and has projected that the population of Swords would rise towards 100,000 by the year 2035. As of 2023, the town is the eighth-largest urban area in the country.

The Swords Cultural Quarter Masterplan by the county council proposed to redevelop the area surrounding the castle into the Swords Cultural Quarter, and to build a new Cultural Centre within this area. Enabling work on the Cultural Centre began in April 2023, during which two medieval wells were discovered under the existing car park. The wells were removed by archaeologists and preserved for potential display at a later date. Construction of the building began in February 2025 and, at that time, was expected to complete in early 2027. The development is due to include a new library, art gallery, 165-seat theatre and café. If implemented as planned, the masterplan would also change the layout of the roads surrounding the castle.

=== Quality of life ===
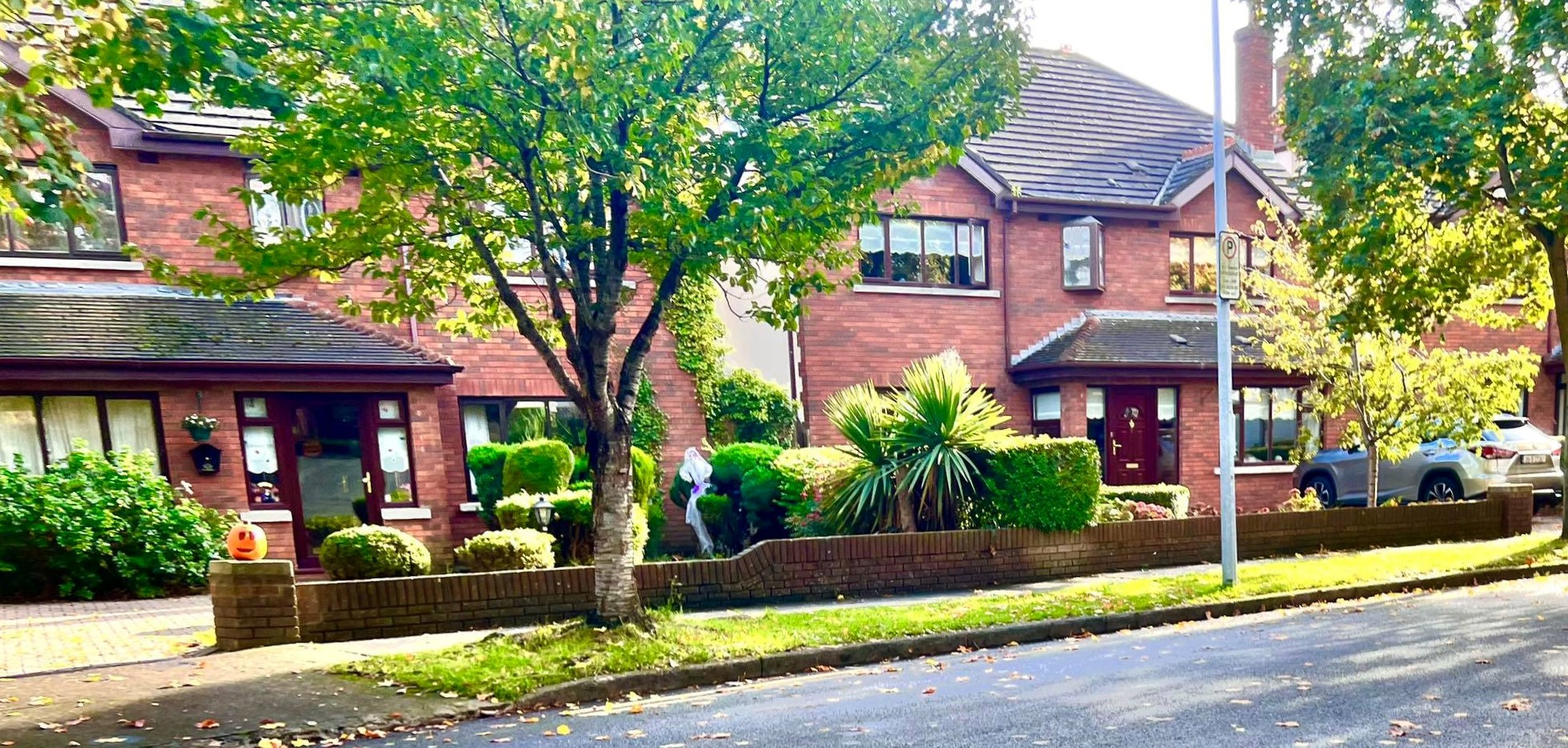
A middle class housing estate on the southern side of Swords

In 2012, Swords was named the third-best town in Ireland to live in. The survey conducted by Retail Excellence Ireland took into account safety, retail, dining, entertainment, events, car parking and the overall attractiveness of the town. Swords has seen steady regeneration of shop fronts, public buildings, and footpaths and the restoration of Swords Castle since the mid-1990s. Households in Swords have the seventh-highest median incomes in the state, among distinct towns (a comparison excluding most other suburbs of the city).

A 2011 Irish Business Against Litter (IBAL) survey declared Swords to be the second cleanest town in Ireland. This came just eight years after an IBAL survey had scored the town as the worst "litter blackspot" in the country. In the 2019 survey, An Taisce, who carry out the surveys on behalf of IBAL, stated: "A stellar showing for this large urban area. Swords is a model for others to follow."

== Geography ==
=== Landscape ===
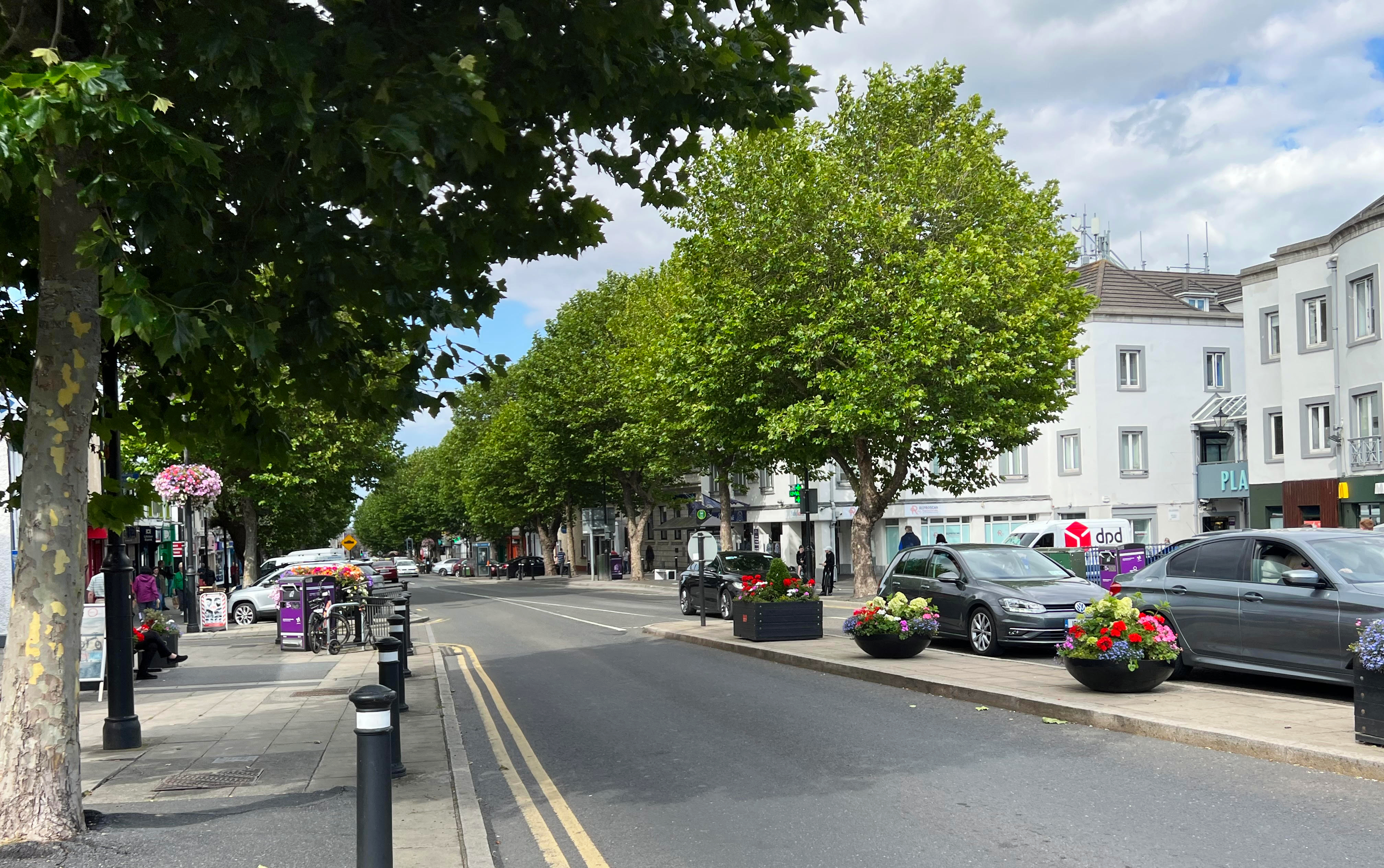
Swords Main Street lined with London plane trees, August 2022

Swords is situated roughly in the centre of the modern county of Fingal and the ancient barony of Nethercross. The Ward River, coming from County Meath, runs west to east to near the centre of the town, and then turns to run north, before flowing into the Broad Meadow Water or Broadmeadow River to the east of the town, across the former northern road. A small stream joins the Ward near the town centre and the holy well. The Broadmeadow, also flowing from Meath, borders the north of the town. It runs from Dunshaughlin in the west and across the north of Swords, before receiving the Ward and flowing into the wide Broadmeadow Estuary, then into the Irish Sea past Malahide. The estuary is crossed by a railway embankment and bridge from Malahide. Swords is surrounded by a protected green belt. Dublin Airport has prevented the town from expanding further south and the large Broadmeadow Estuary and Malahide beyond limit expansion further east. To the north and west of Swords, there is sparsely populated, relatively flat, farmland.

=== Townlands and baronies ===
The civil parish of Swords mainly lies in the ancient barony of Nethercross. Swords Demesne is the name of the townland in the heart of the urban town of Swords. It is one of 58 such geographic units in the civil parish. However, a single parcel of land, 5 acres in extent, is situated in the barony of Coolock as an exclave of the civil parish proper.

There are 10 townlands in the electoral division of Swords, which is not coterminous with the civil parish.

=== Urban layout ===
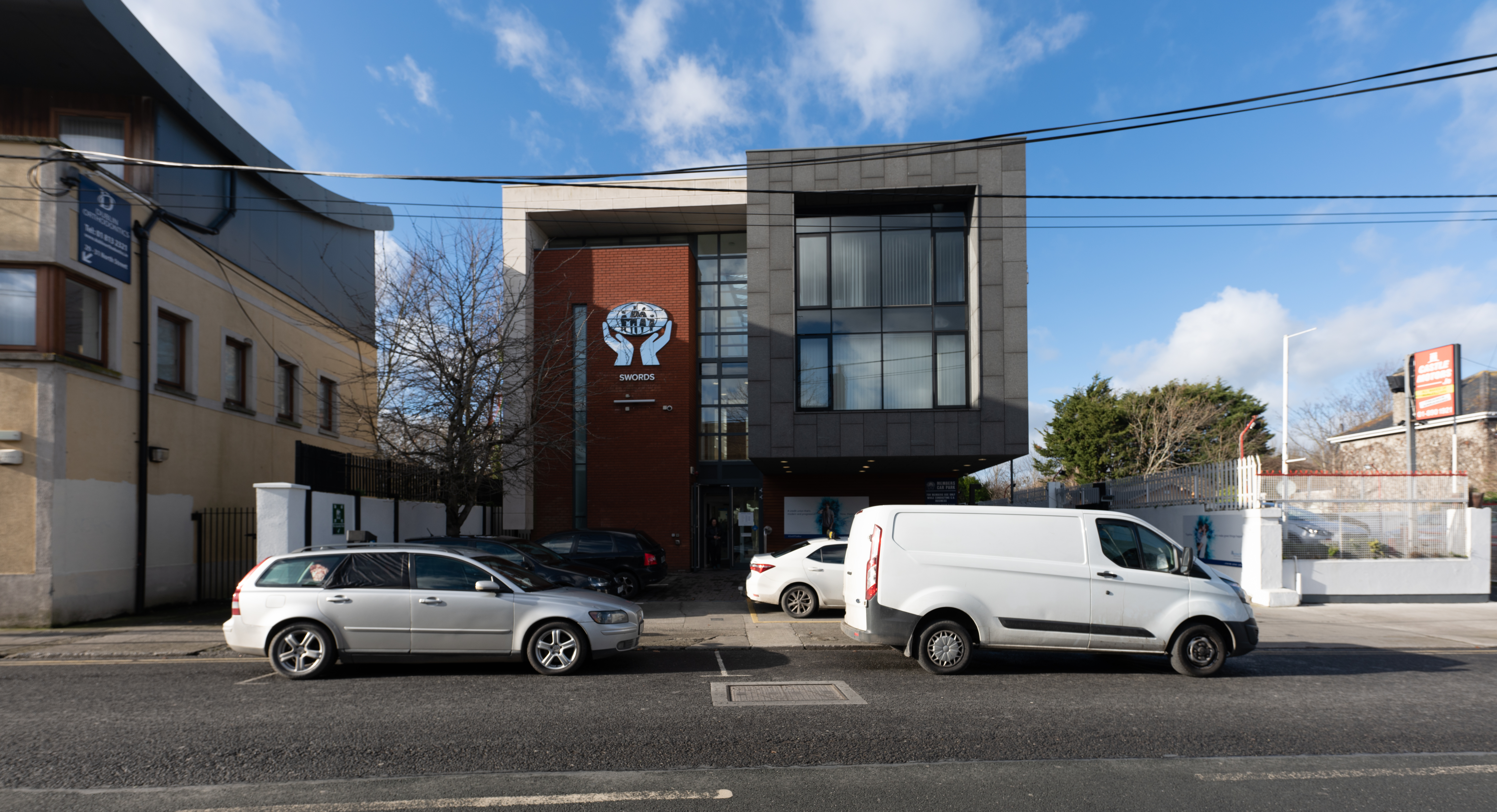
A Credit Union on North Street

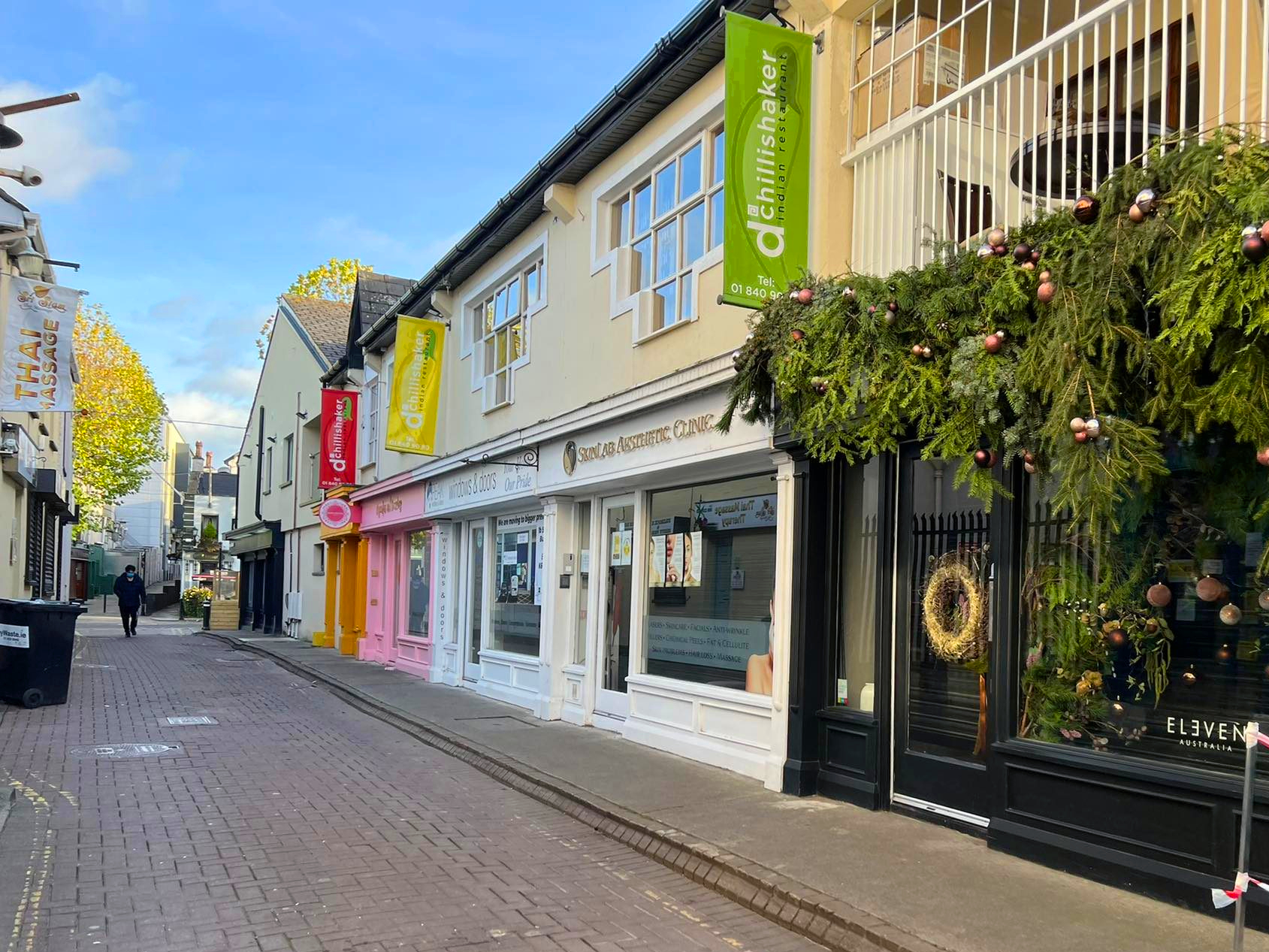
St. Columcille's Court, Swords

The main retail area is located in the centre of the town and includes the town's wide, tree-lined Main Street, and the Pavilions and Swords Central combined shopping centres. There are also two smaller retail developments, Swords Plaza and Swords Town Mall. Most civic facilities are also in this central area, with some subsidiary shopping and civic centres in surrounding housing areas.

The west of the urban area is mainly residential, with the neighbourhoods of Applewood, Rathbeale and Brackenstown to the north of the Ward River and Knocksedan, River Valley, Rathingle, Highfields, and Boroimhe to the south side of the river.

The main business and industrial areas are located to the east of the town centre, along the R132 dual carriageway. These include Balheary Industrial Park, Swords Business Campus, Swords Business Park, and the Airside campus (Business Park, Retail Park and Motor Park). These campuses separate the town centre from the residential neighbourhoods further east — Seatown, Lissenhall, Holywell and Drynam (or Drinan) — for which reason the Central Statistics Office treats the latter areas as forming a separate census town, which since 1991 it has dubbed Kinsealy–Drinan and had a population of 7,526 at the 2022 census. The development plan for Fingal County Council treats Kinsealy–Drinan as part of Swords.

=== Climate ===
The climate of Swords is, like the rest of Ireland, classified as a maritime temperate climate (Cfb) according to the Köppen climate classification system. It is mild and changeable with abundant rainfall and a lack of temperature extremes. The hottest months of the year are June, July and August with temperatures of around 17 – 20 degrees. Swords gets rainfall all year round and the wettest months are October to January.

Climate data for Swords (Dublin Airport) (1981–2010 averages)
Month	Jan	Feb	Mar	Apr	May	Jun	Jul	Aug	Sep	Oct	Nov	Dec	Year
Record high °C (°F)	16.5 (61.7)	16.2 (61.2)	17.2 (63.0)	20.5 (68.9)	23.5 (74.3)	25.7 (78.3)	27.6 (81.7)	28.7 (83.7)	24.6 (76.3)	21.0 (69.8)	18.0 (64.4)	16.2 (61.2)	28.7 (83.7)
Mean daily maximum °C (°F)	8.1 (46.6)	8.3 (46.9)	10.2 (50.4)	12.1 (53.8)	14.8 (58.6)	17.6 (63.7)	19.5 (67.1)	19.2 (66.6)	17.0 (62.6)	13.6 (56.5)	10.3 (50.5)	8.3 (46.9)	13.3 (55.9)
Daily mean °C (°F)	5.3 (41.5)	5.3 (41.5)	6.8 (44.2)	8.3 (46.9)	10.9 (51.6)	13.6 (56.5)	15.6 (60.1)	15.3 (59.5)	13.4 (56.1)	10.5 (50.9)	7.4 (45.3)	5.6 (42.1)	9.8 (49.6)
Mean daily minimum °C (°F)	2.4 (36.3)	2.3 (36.1)	3.4 (38.1)	4.6 (40.3)	6.9 (44.4)	9.6 (49.3)	11.7 (53.1)	11.5 (52.7)	9.8 (49.6)	7.3 (45.1)	4.5 (40.1)	2.8 (37.0)	6.4 (43.5)
Record low °C (°F)	−9.5 (14.9)	−6.7 (19.9)	−7.9 (17.8)	−4.0 (24.8)	−1.6 (29.1)	2.1 (35.8)	4.6 (40.3)	2.4 (36.3)	1.2 (34.2)	−3.3 (26.1)	−8.4 (16.9)	−12.2 (10.0)	−12.2 (10.0)
Average rainfall mm (inches)	62.6 (2.46)	48.8 (1.92)	52.7 (2.07)	54.1 (2.13)	59.5 (2.34)	66.7 (2.63)	56.2 (2.21)	73.3 (2.89)	59.5 (2.34)	79.0 (3.11)	72.9 (2.87)	72.7 (2.86)	758.0 (29.84)
Average rainy days	17	15	17	15	15	14	16	16	15	17	17	17	191
Average snowy days	4.6	4.2	2.8	1.2	0.2	0.0	0.0	0.0	0.0	0.0	0.8	2.9	16.6
Average relative humidity (%)	80.6	75.7	71.0	68.3	68.0	68.3	69.0	69.3	71.5	75.1	80.3	83.1	73.3
Mean daily sunshine hours	1.9	2.7	3.5	5.3	6.2	5.8	5.3	5.1	4.3	3.3	2.4	1.7	3.9
Source: Met Éireann

=== Demographics ===
Swords
Year	Pop.	±%
1821	1,727	—
1831	2,537	+46.9%
1841	1,788	−29.5%
1851	1,294	−27.6%
1861	1,296	+0.2%
1871	1,008	−22.2%
1881	1,088	+7.9%
1891	983	−9.7%
1901	944	−4.0%
1911	907	−3.9%
1926	839	−7.5%
1936	838	−0.1%
1946	703	−16.1%
1951	1,136	+61.6%
1956	1,629	+43.4%
1961	1,816	+11.5%
1966	1,892	+4.2%
1971	4,133	+118.4%
1981	11,138	+169.5%
1986	15,312	+37.5%
1991	17,705	+15.6%
1996	22,314	+26.0%
2002	27,175	+21.8%
2006	33,998	+25.1%
2011	36,924	+8.6%
2016	39,248	+6.3%
2022	40,776	+3.9%

Swords has developed into the eighth largest urban area in Ireland, with a population of 40,776 at the 2022 census. The town's period of rapid population growth began in the 1970s with the construction of the extensive Rivervalley Estate, then Ireland's largest private housing development, ahead of the Kilnamanagh Estate in Tallaght North. It continued during the 1990s and 2000s, with many new residents moving to the area due to its proximity to work at Dublin Airport and various industrial estates / business parks.

Fingal County Council has referred to Swords as an "Emerging City", and has suggested that the overall area's population may reach 100,000 by 2035.

== Transport ==
=== Roads ===
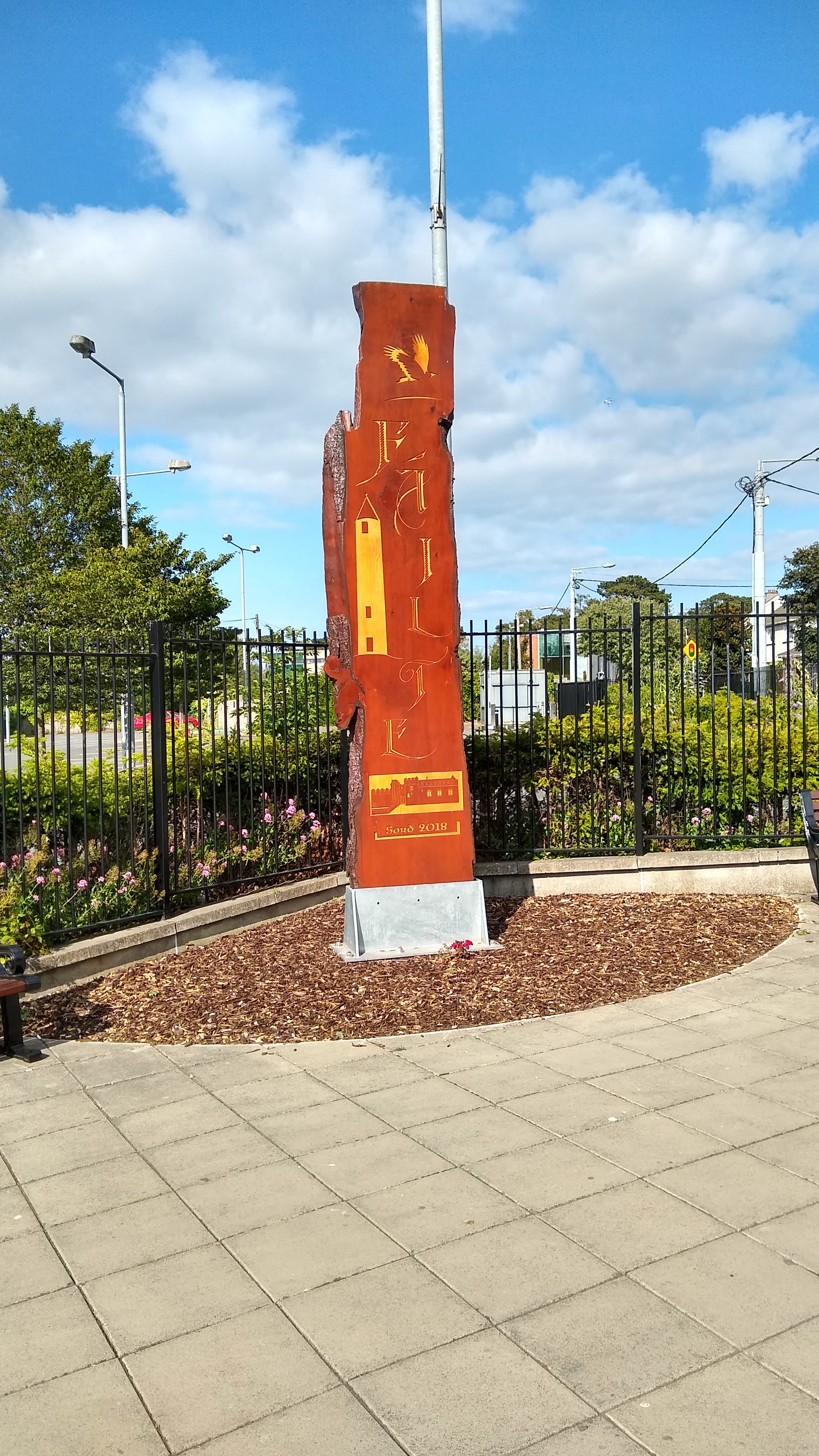
Fáilte Sord 2018 sculpture

Swords has good road links due to its proximity to Dublin city, which is the main focus of the Irish road network. The M1 Dublin–Belfast motorway passes along the eastern edge of the town and is the main route to/from Dublin City, Drogheda, Dundalk, Newry and Belfast. The M50 Dublin semi-orbital motorway passes to the south of the town and provides connections with all of the other main roads out of Dublin (N2, N3, N4, N7, N81 and M11). The R132 dual-carriageway bypasses the centre of Swords, and runs south to Dublin Airport and north to Balbriggan. The proposed Swords Western Ring Road dual carriageway is due to run from the M1 at Lissenhall, north of Swords, along the western edge of Swords to the M2 motorway at Cherryhound. Other main roads from Swords include the R106 to Malahide and Portmarnock, R108 to Ballyboughal and Naul, R125 to Ashbourne and the M2 motorway, R126 to Donabate and Portrane and R127 to Lusk and Skerries.

=== Bus ===
The town's Main Street is served by Dublin Bus (and Go-Ahead Ireland) routes 33, 33A, 33B, 33N, 41, 41B, 41C, 41X, 43, 102 and 142 as well as Bus Éireann routes 101 and 101n, and Swords Express routes 500, 500x, 501, 501x and 502. Buses operate between Swords and Dublin city centre approximately every 5 minutes throughout the day, through a combination of Dublin Bus routes 33, 41, 41B, 41C, 41X & 43, with a journey time of about an hour. Swords Express operate express services through the Dublin Port Tunnel which take about 35 minutes. Other bus routes serving Swords include the 102 to Malahide, Portmarnock and Sutton, route 33b to Donabate and Portrane, routes 33 and 33a to Lusk, Rush, Skerries, and Balbriggan and Bus Éireann route 101 to Balbriggan, Julianstown and Drogheda. Connect Bus and Coach operate route H1 every 20 minutes between Dublin Airport and the Travelodge Hotel in Swords.

There are a number of long-distance bus services from the Atrium Road and coach park in Dublin Airport to various locations throughout the country operated by Bus Éireann and other private companies, including 50 daily services to Belfast (route 1/X2 & Aircoach), 12 to Derry (route 33 & John Mc Ginley), 11 to Letterkenny (route 32 & John Mc Ginley), 9 to Donegal (route 30), 3 to Sligo (route 23), 1 to Ballina (route 22), 52 to Galway (route 20, Citylink & gobus), 14 to Limerick (route 12 & JJ Kavanagh), 24 to Cork (GoBé & Aircoach), 6 to Clonmel (JJ Kavanagh), 21 to Waterford (route 4/X4 & JJ Kavanagh) and 31 to Wexford (route 2, Ardcavan & Wexford Bus).

=== Rail ===
Swords has no railway services. The nearest railway stations are at Malahide and Donabate. Malahide is served by the frequent DART service to Bray, through the city centre. Both Malahide and Donabate are served by Dublin – Drogheda commuter services.

Swords is the only Dublin county town not served by rail, as Tallaght in South Dublin is served by the Luas light rail system, and Dún Laoghaire is served by the DART and Irish Rail services.

=== Metro ===
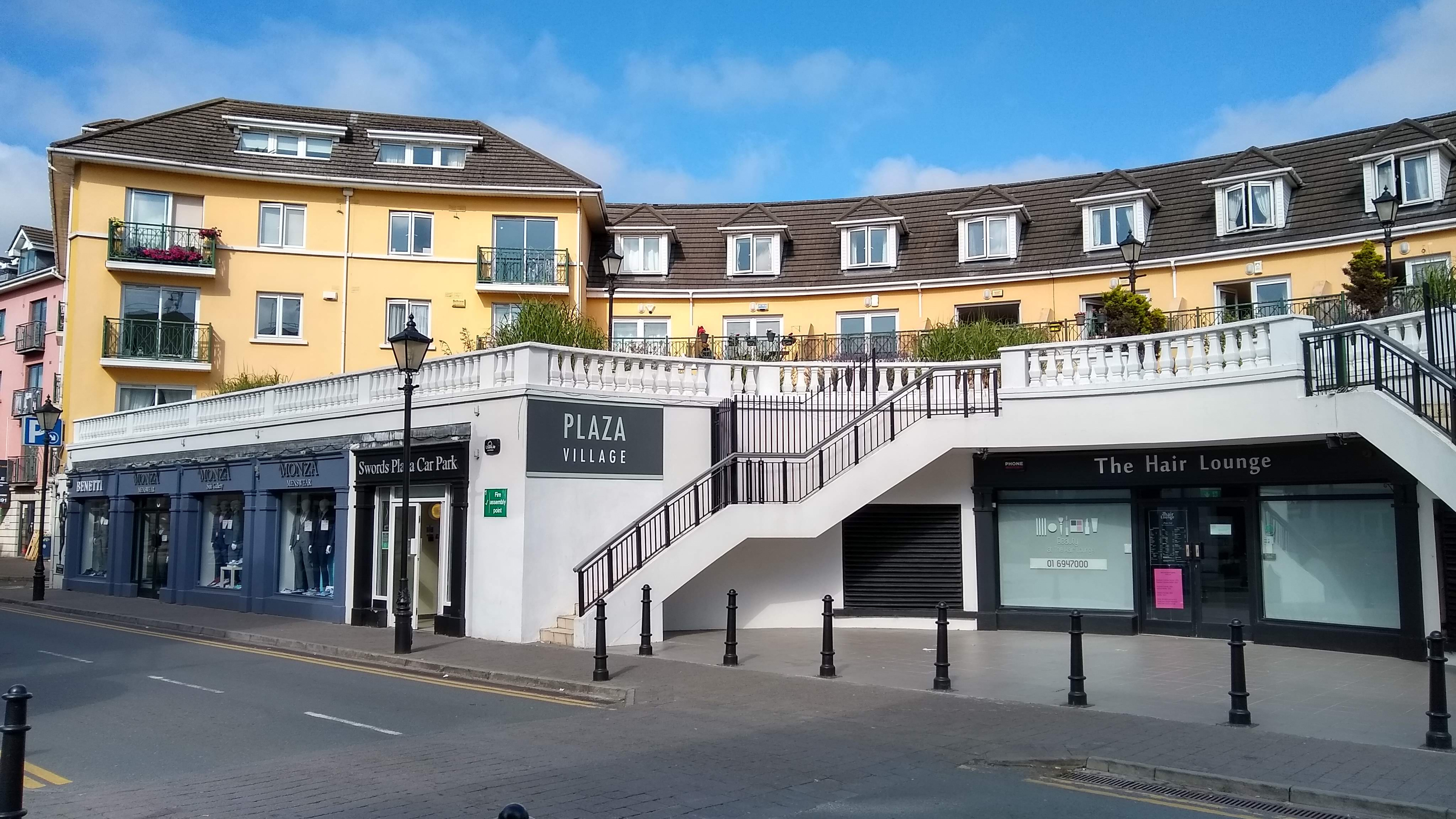
The Plaza, Swords

There are proposals for a light rapid transit line, MetroLink, to run from Charlemont to Swords via the Mater Hospital, Glasnevin railway station, Dublin City University, Ballymun and Dublin Airport. As of July 2022, the MetroLink project was proposed to begin construction in 2025 and that, "all going well" it could be in operation by 2035.

=== Dublin Airport ===
Dublin Airport, the busiest airport in Ireland, is located at Collinstown, several kilometres to the south of Swords. The airport has direct flights to Britain, Europe, North America, North Africa and the Middle East. In 2019, 32.9 million passenger journeys were recorded, and it is by far the busiest of the airports by total passenger traffic in Ireland.

=== Knocksedan Heliport ===
Knocksedan Heliport is a private heliport on the western side of Swords, run by Celtic Helicopters. It has four hangars and the operators provide a helicopter wash facility and Jet A1 Fuel. Irish Helicopters also use the heliport. They provide aerial crane, filming and survey services, helicopter charter and maintenance, spraying and special project services.

== Features and historical attractions ==
Some historical attractions are listed below. Many of these are promoted by Swords Historical Society.

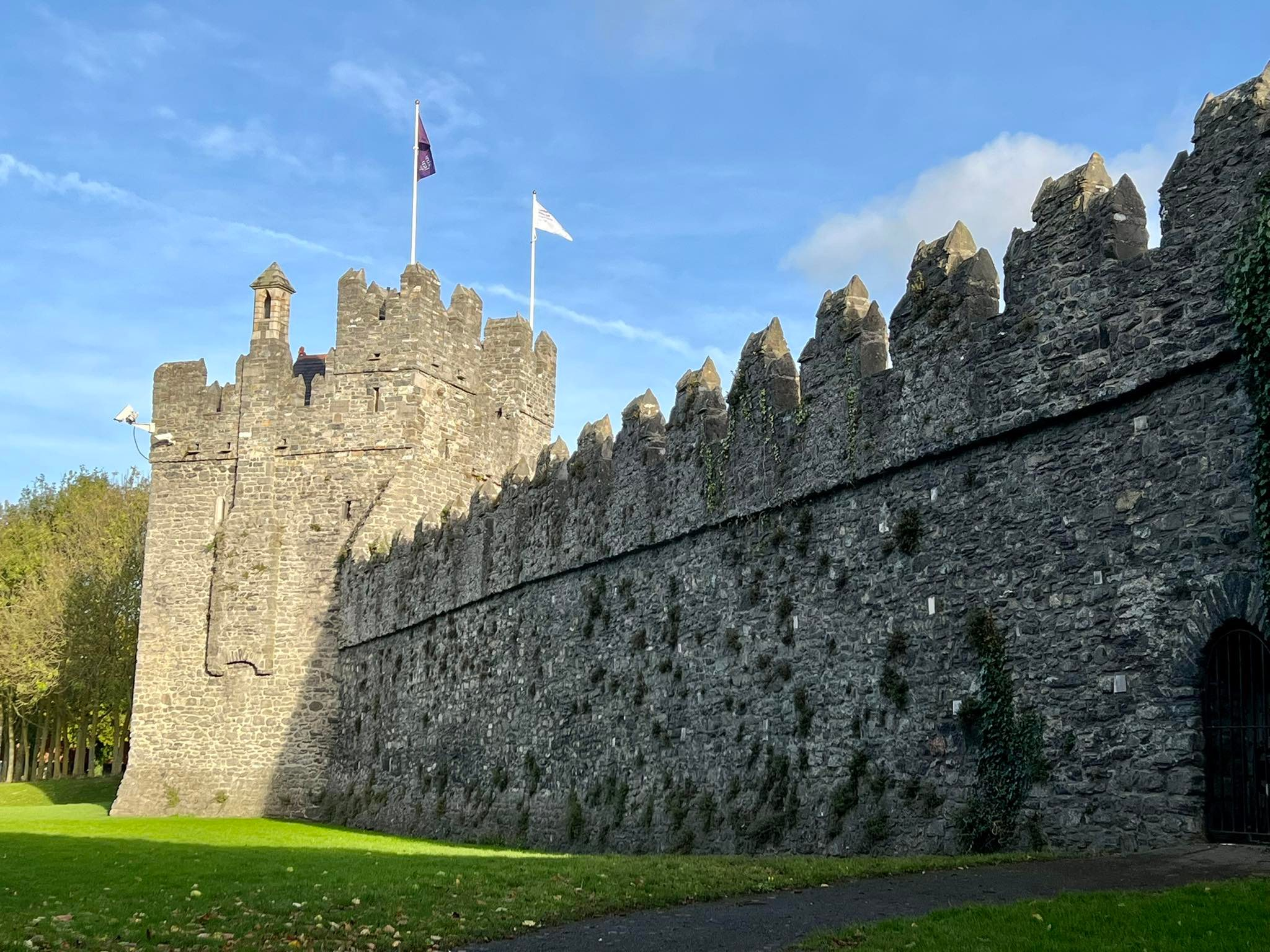
Swords Castle as seen from Swords Town Park

=== Swords Castle ===
Swords Castle was built as the manorial residence of the 1st Archbishop of Dublin, John Comyn, around 1200 or a little later in Swords, just north of Dublin. It was never strong in the military sense, but covers a large pentagonal walled area of nearly 1.5 acres (6,100 m^{2}) with a tower on the north and a gateway complex on the south. The adjoining chapel, built in the late thirteenth century, was probably used as the Archbishop's private oratory.

Other buildings, recorded in an inquisition in 1326, have now vanished, including the great hall on the east side of the enclosure. The Archbishop abandoned Swords once a new palace was built at Tallaght in 1324. The stepped battlements suggest some form of occupancy during the fifteenth century, but by 1583, when briefly occupied by Dutch Protestants, it was described as "the quite spoiled old castle". It was used as a garden in the nineteenth century and sold after the Church of Ireland was disestablished.

Swords Castle has undergone restoration and is open as a tourist attraction. The castle was used as a film location for the production of TV series The Tudors in the spring of 2010.

=== St. Colmcille's Well ===
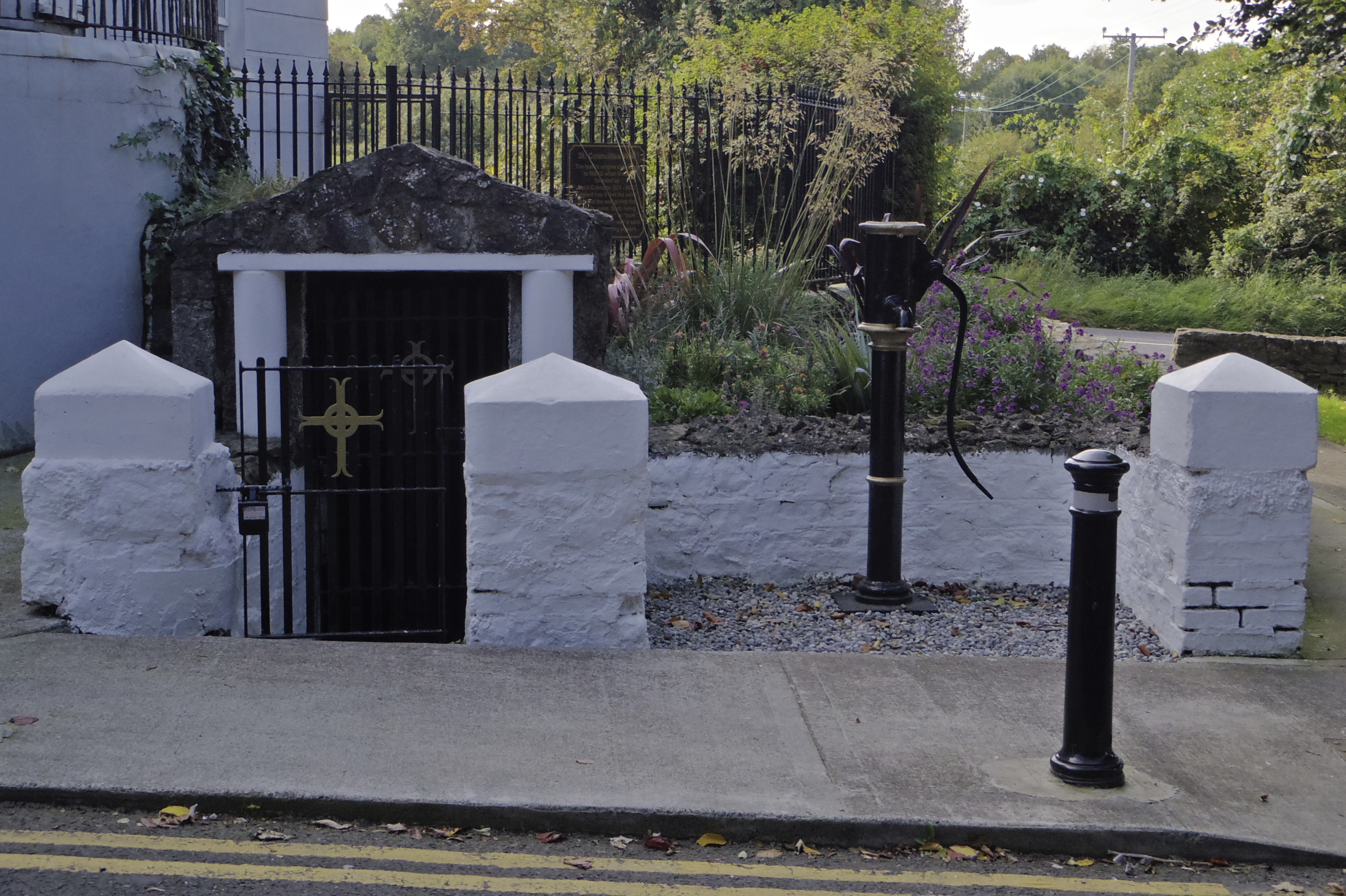
St Colmcilles Well

On Well Road, also known as St. Columb's Well. In a locked chamber. Reputed to be where Swords got its name when St. Colmcille blessed the well of clear water, 'Sord' being the Irish for 'clear or pure'.

=== St. Columba's Church, Belfry & Round Tower ===
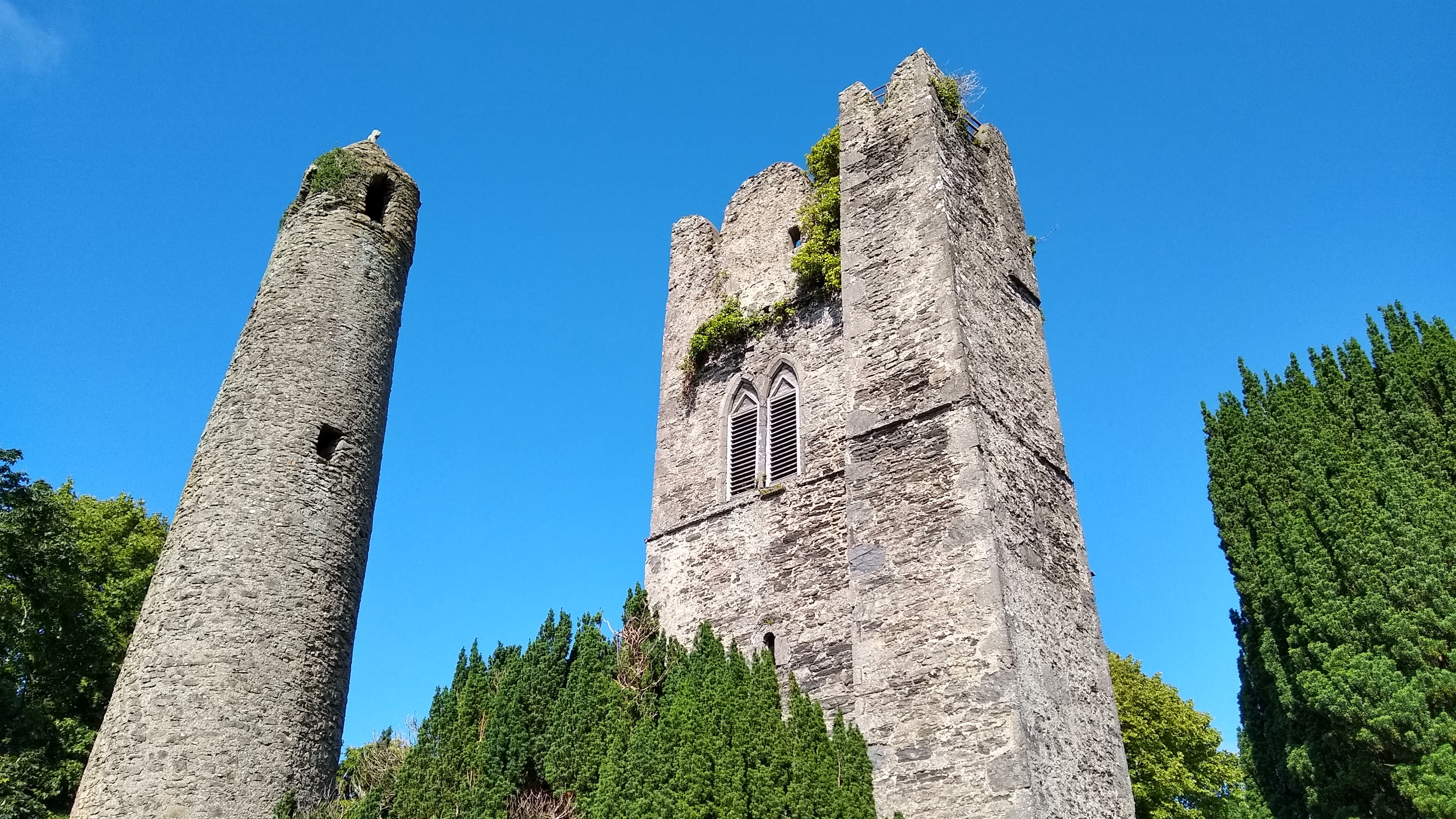
St. Columba's Church and round tower

The round tower is the surviving remnant of St. Colmcille's monastic settlement. The only remaining relic of the medieval church is its belfry, from c. 1300, which is open to the public in the summertime. The original church is said to have fallen into ruin sometime in the seventeenth century. The new church of early Gothic style was built in 1811 on the foundations of the old. The Sexton's Lodge was built in 1870. The body of Brian Boru was said to have been brought there in 1014 to be waked after the Battle of Clontarf, while on the way to be buried in Armagh. As well as St. Columba's, Swords was served by Cloghran-Swords church, south of the town, up until it was merged with Santry in 1872.

=== Old Borough School ===
Located on Main Street, the building was designed by the architect Francis Johnston. In 2015, Wetherspoon bought the premises, and now operates The Old Borough as a public house.

=== St. Colmcille's Catholic Church ===
On Chapel Lane, a pre-Catholic emancipation church was built in 1827 on a site donated by James Taylor of Swords House. The graveyard contains the headstones of nationalist politician Andrew Kettle, who was known as "Parnell's Righthand Man".

=== Courthouse ===
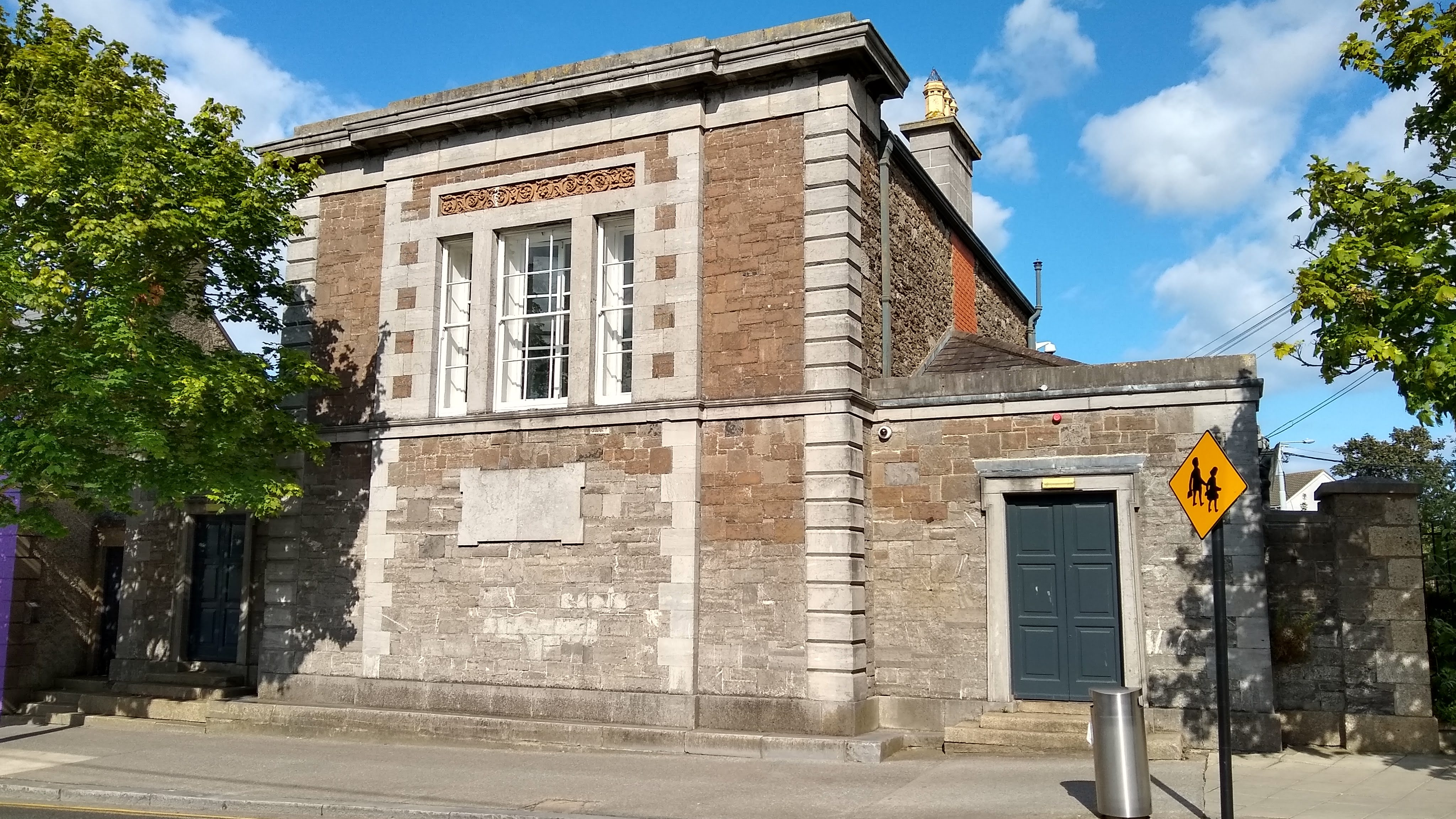
Swords Courthouse

Designed by Alexander Tate, Swords Courthouse is located on North Street and was built in 1845 in Classical style.

=== Lord Mayors ===
Founded in 1668, the 350-year-old Lord Mayors is a Swords landmark. The thatched-roof pub is the oldest structure in the village.

The Lord mayors closed for business in April 2019 leaving the premises vacant, with some locals questioning the plan to build 172 apartments on the site of the historic structure.

=== Fingal County Hall ===
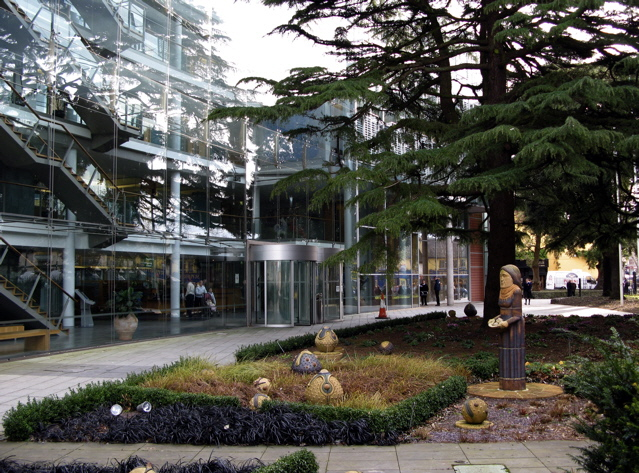
Fingal County Hall

The modern Fingal County Hall, by Bucholz McEvoy Architects, is located at the northern end of Main Street. It is built on the site of Swords House, the home of the Norman family, the Taylors of Swords. Records show the family arrived there in the 13th century and built a 'Mansion House' in 1403.

== Leisure and cultural facilities ==
=== Historical society ===
Swords Historical Society, founded in 1982, is supported by volunteers who have worked to record, promote and preserve the heritage of the greater Swords area. The society's Museum and Heritage Centre at the Carnegie Library on North Street is run by volunteers and is open on weekday afternoons. The society's oral history project has produced an annual 'Swords Voices' publication, which chronicles the memories of local people.

=== Ward River Valley Park ===
The Ward River Valley Park is a linear park on the banks of the Ward River approaching town. It covers an area of 89 ha. (220 acres) between Swords town centre and Knocksedan Bridge. Features include some 12th-century fortifications, woodland habitats, wetlands and rolling grassland. There are viewing points, picnic sites, sports pitches and tennis courts. The park is known locally as "The Jacko", which is a nickname that is thought to have originated in the 1960s.

=== Swords Town Park (with Swords Castle) ===
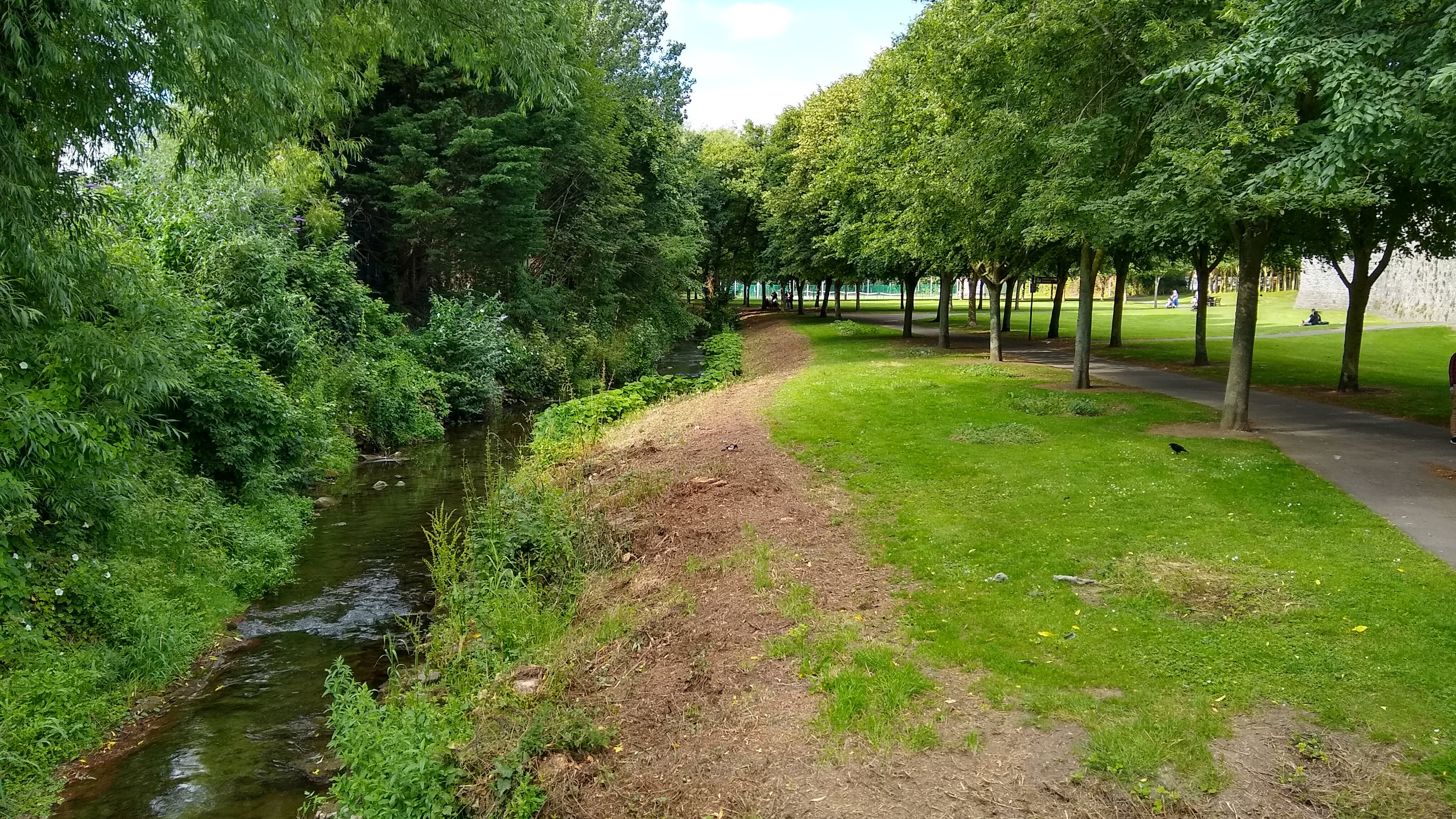
Swords Town Park, with Ward River on left

Swords Town Park is a small park situated in the centre of the town of Swords, along the Ward River. It has tennis courts and a playground. Swords Castle lies within the park. It is the former residence of the Archbishop of Dublin and it is the only fortified residence of the Archbishop to survive in a reasonable state today (see above).

=== Balheary Park ===
Balheary Park is north of the town centre near the confluence of the Broadmeadow River and the Ward River, which flow to the northern and southern edges of the park. It meets Swords Business Campus / Balheary Business Park on three sides and has some playing pitches which are used by the Fingallians GAA club. In mid-2006, Fingal County Council built a skatepark and adjoining basketball courts/football court in Balheary Park. The park contains a bowl, a vert wall, a spine, some quarterpipes, and a section of boxes in the middle of the park.

=== Broadmeadow River Linear Park ===
The Broadmeadow Linear Park is a small park north of Applewood along the Broadmeadow River. Fingal County Council plan to extend the park eastwards to Balheary Park and westwards into the proposed Swords Regional Park.

=== National Show Centre ===
A little south of Swords, near Dublin Airport, the National Show Centre is an exhibition and conference venue owned by the Irish Kennel Club. The venue is used as a counting centre during elections for the Dublin Fingal constituency.

== Sports ==
=== Boxing ===
Swords Boxing Club is based at Sluagh Hall, a former military facility which is shared with Fingallians GAA club. Fingal Boxing Academy, which is affiliated with the Irish Amateur Boxing Association and located in Rivervalley, Swords, was the first boxing club in Ireland to train female boxers and has trained several national champions.

=== GAA ===
There are three Gaelic Athletic Association clubs local to Swords, and one more with pitches. These include Fingallians (based at Lawless Memorial Park), St. Finian's (Rivervalley), and St Colmcille's (Holybanks, Glen Ellan Road in the Applewood neighbourhood).

=== Golf ===
There are several golf courses close to the town, namely Swords Open Golf Course, Forrest Little Golf Club, Roganstown Golf and Country Club and Balheary "Par 3" Golf Course. There are also several driving ranges in the area with the Drynam Golf Centre being the first driving range in Ireland with automated tees.

=== Rugby ===
Swords RFC are a rugby union team playing in Division 3 of the Leinster League. The club is based out of ALSAA Sports Complex beside the airport and has 2 Men's teams and 1 Women's team.

=== Soccer ===
Swords Celtic, established in 1962, fields DDSL, NDSL, LSL, and MGL schoolboy and schoolgirl teams. The main pitch and clubhouse are located at Balheary, Swords and include dressing rooms an eleven-a-side and two seven-a-side pitches with floodlights.

Swords Manor FC, established in 1995, fields NDSL, DDSL, MGL, and UCFL schoolboy and schoolgirl teams. The main pitch and clubhouse are located on Brackenstown Road.

River Valley Rangers AFC was established in 1981. It fields NDSL schoolboy/girl teams and its pitch and clubhouse are located in Ridgewood Park.

Columbas Rovers FC was established in 2002. It uses the ALSAA sports centre near the airport.

A former club, Swords Rovers FC (founded in 1993), was disbanded in 2015.

Dublin Airport Football Club, formerly known as Aer Rianta Soccer Club, was formed in 1972. The club is based in the ALSAA Sports Complex, Dublin Airport and comepetes in the Leinster Senior League.

=== Other sports ===
Fingal Orienteers have created orienteering maps of the Ward River Valley park, and the surrounding estates of Swords Manor, Brackenstown, River Valley and Knocksedan, and regularly hold events in the area.

Racquet sports clubs include Forest Badminton Club, River Valley Badminton Club, and Swords Tennis Club (based at Swords Town Park). Swords Hockey Club is a ladies club based in ALSAA Sports Grounds.

== Events ==
=== Horticultural and agricultural shows ===
The Fingal Horticultural Society holds their annual flower show in Swords every August. It includes competition classes in cut flowers, flower arranging, cookery, wine making, photography, painting and handcrafts.

The Flavours of Fingal agricultural show first took place in July 2012 in Newbridge House near Donabate. The farm section of the two-day show featured a program of livestock and sheep competitions, equestrian contests and other agricultural displays. Separately, the walled garden of Newbridge House hosted the food producers section of the show.

=== Dog shows ===
In 2012 over 80 dog shows were held in the National Show Centre, including the Celtic Winners Dog Show, held on St. Patrick's Day.

=== Fingal 10k Road Race ===
The first Fingal 10k Road Race took place on 22 July 2012 on the roads around Swords. It was part of the Dublin Race Series, a series which culminates in the Dublin Marathon. Over 4200 people entered the first race, and the event has since been run annually.

== Economy ==
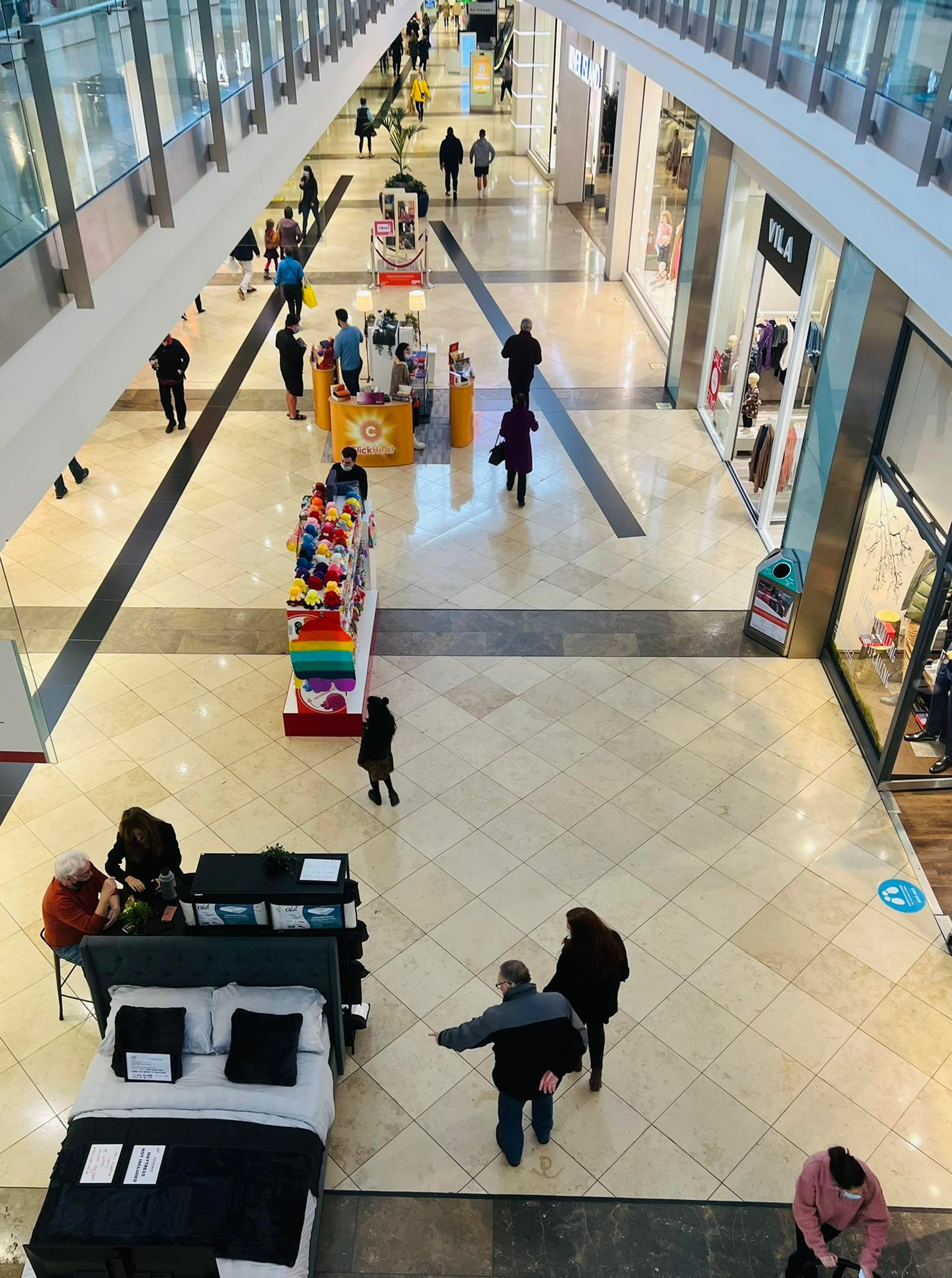
A concourse area in Pavilions Swords

=== Commercial and retail ===
Swords is the home to a large retail and business park called Airside Retail and Business Park, on the southern fringe of the town, hosting a number of employers. It is home to several corporates, including Ryanair, AIB, eShopWorld, Sandisk, Fujitsu, Ricoh, AtkinsRéalis and the European headquarters of Kellogg's. Ingersoll Rand also has its corporate headquarters in the Airside Business Park.

East of the town, running parallel to Swords bypass, lies the large Swords Business Park, where the Hertz Corporation have a Shared Services Centre.

Swords also has a large shopping centre, the Pavilions Swords, off the R132, which has a multi-screen cinema and branches of SuperValu and Dunnes Stores.

=== Aviation ===
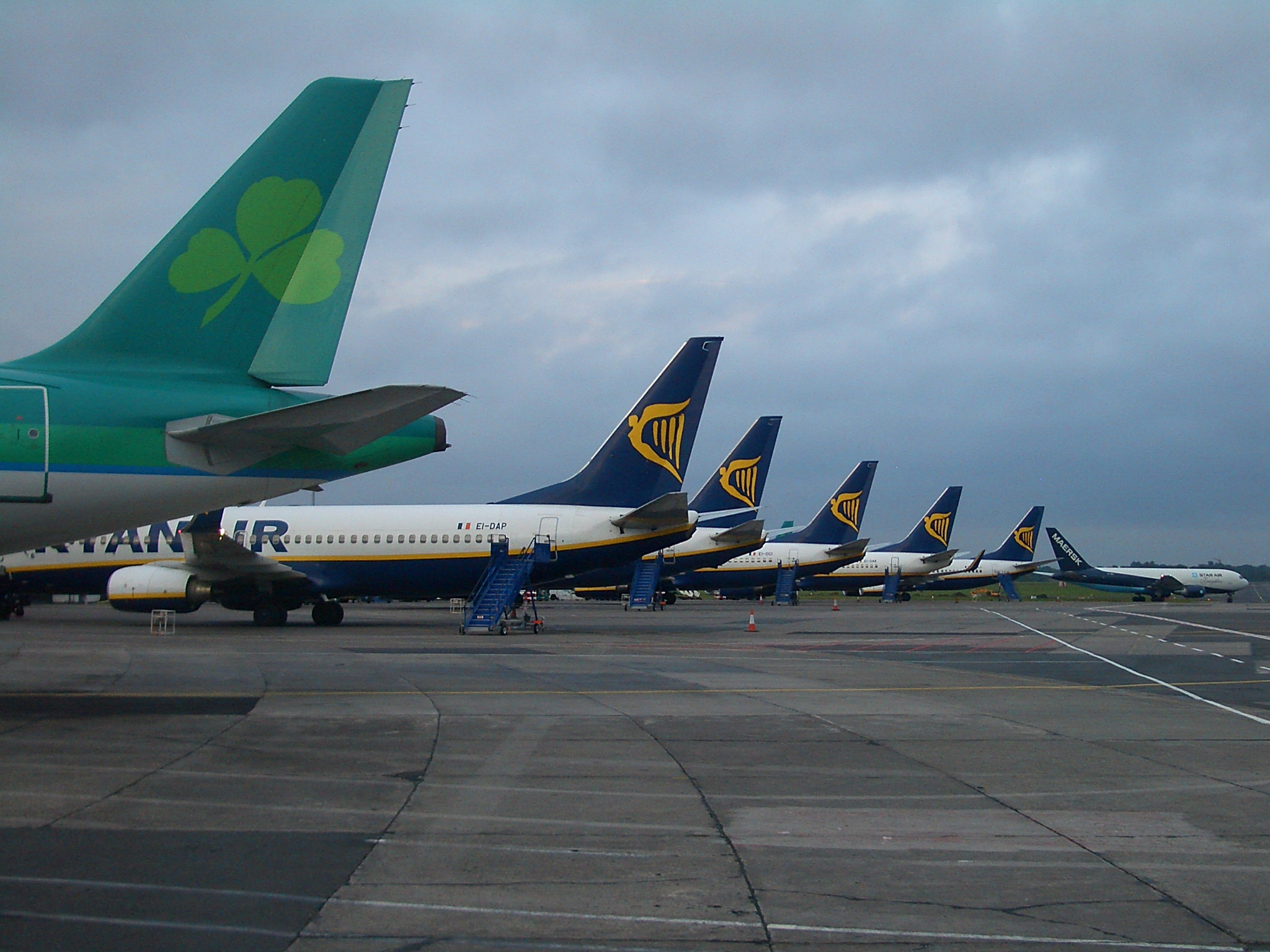
Empennages of an Aer Lingus and Ryanair planes at Dublin Airport, near Swords.

Swords is the closest town to Dublin Airport and the two share the same Eircode routing area key of K67. The airport has long provided employment to the area. In 2011, Dublin Airport handled over 18.7 million passengers and served over 171 routes with 62 airlines. The airport serves as an operating base for Aer Lingus, Aer Lingus Regional, Air Contractors, CityJet, Ryanair and Thomson Airways, and as a maintenance base for Aer Lingus, CityJet, Dublin Aerospace, Eirtech Aviation, Etihad Airways and Ryanair.

The Irish Aviation Authority operate the Dublin Air Traffic Control Centre on the airport.

The headquarters of the Dublin Airport Authority and Ireland's four largest airlines are located in or near Swords. The Dublin Airport Authority, who manage Dublin, Cork and Shannon Airports, employ over 3,000 people and have their headquarters on the airport campus. Aer Lingus, Ireland's flag carrier, have their headquarters on the Dublin Airport campus. CityJet, part of the Air France-KLM group, has its headquarters in Swords Business Campus and Air Contractors, part of the ASL Aviation group, has its head office on the Malahide Road in Swords. In 2014, Ryanair moved into a new €20m, 100,000 sq ft Dublin Head Office in Airside Business Park. The building was officially opened in April 2014.

=== Logistics ===
In 2007 Tesco Ireland opened their new €70 million distribution centre in Lanestown, between Swords and Donabate. With a building footprint of over 68,000 m^{2} and a total volume of 1.55 million m^{2} the Tesco Ireland distribution centre is the largest building on the island of Ireland and one of the 10 largest building in the world. The building is over half a kilometre long, has 106 loading bays and supplies 106 stores up to 6 times a day.

=== Pharmaceutical ===
Swords is the home to several international chemical producers and pharmaceutical giants, including Opec. Merck Sharp & Dohme (formally Organnon) employ over 500 people in their facility in Drynam, which manufactures women's health, anaesthesiology and mental health products. Bristol Myers Squibb employ over 400 people in their Swords Laboratories bulk pharmaceutical plant on Watery Lane. The Lonza Group employ 45 people in their European manufacturing facility for personal care and industrial biocides, also on Watery Lane.

=== Food and horticulture ===
Swords is located in the centre of Fingal and is surrounded by farms growing crops like potatoes, wheat and barley. However, unlike the rest of Fingal, a lot of the food distributed from Swords has been imported from abroad. As of 2018, FoodCentral (marketed as "Ireland's national food park") was being developed south-west of Swords.

The Keeling's Group, who employ over 1700 people, have their headquarters in FoodCentral and use a lot of land around Swords. The Keeling's Farms division annually grow 2,500 tonnes of soft fruits/berries from 5 hectares of glasshouse, tunnel and field crops in Swords. They grow Bramley apples in 139 acres of orchards and lettuce in 8 acres of glasshouses. Their glasshouses also produce 1,500 tonnes of red, orange, yellow and green peppers annually. Keeling's also operate a large banana ripening facility for Chiquita which ripens over 3 million bananas each week. They also have separate ripening rooms for other fruits.

Total Produce, Ireland's largest agribusiness operates two facilities in Swords. Its facility in Swords Business Park includes a distribution and ripening centre for Fyffes Cape, Outspan, Green Ace and TOP Fruit products. Their "Uniplumo" facility on the Rathbeale Road, has 46,000 square metres of glasshouses for growing plants, flowers and tomatoes.

== Education ==
=== Primary ===
The town is served by more than 10 primary schools. These include several gaelscoils, a number of Educate Together schools, and mixed and gender-specific national schools. The latter includes both Church of Ireland and Catholic schools. A number of other primary schools are in planning or under construction.

=== Secondary ===
The secondary schools serving the town include Loreto College (all-girls school, River Valley), Coláiste Choilm C.B.S. (all-boys school, Dublin Road), Fingal Community College (Seatown Road), St. Finian's Community College (Castlefarm), and Swords Community College (Rathbeale Road)

=== Third level and further education ===
Land has been reserved for a potential university campus at Lissenhall in north Swords.

The National Learning Network, Fingal Adult Education Service and Swords Youthreach each have a presence in the area.

There is also the Fingal Adult Literacy and Education Centre

== Religion ==
Population by religion (Census 2011)	Persons
Roman Catholic	34,021
Orthodox (Greek, Coptic, Russian)	1,335
Church of Ireland, England, Anglican, Episcopalian	944
Apostolic or Pentecostal	201
Presbyterian	195
Other Christian religion	454
Total Christian religions	37,150
Muslim (Islamic)	579
Other stated religions	1,003
No religion	3,006
Not stated	1,000
Total Population	42,738

=== Christianity ===
Christianity is the predominant religion in Swords and Roman Catholicism is the predominant denomination. The town has six Roman Catholic churches. St. Colmcille's, the Church of the Visitation and Our Lady Queen of Heaven are all within Swords parish. St. Cronan's and St. Finian's each belong to distinct parishes, while the Church of the Immaculate Conception lies within Donabate parish.

There are also a further eight Christian churches and a retreat centre. These include Swords Baptist Church which meets in The Riasc Centre in Feltrim. and St. Columba's Church of Ireland church on Church Road, Other Protestant and evangelical communities include the Apostolic Faith Church and Churchtown Trust. The Syriac Orthodox Church meets as the St. Ignatius Jacobite Congregation in St Columba's Church of Ireland church. Jehovah's Witnesses meet at a Kingdom Hall on Kettles Lane.

=== Islam ===
The Dublin Welfare Society manage a makeshift mosque in a Swords industrial estate

== Politics ==
Swords is part of the Dáil constituency of Dublin Fingal East. The local electoral area of Swords has 7 councillors on Fingal County Council.

== Notable people ==
- Saint Colmcille, founder of Swords.
- Gruffudd ap Cynan (1055–1137), Welsh King of Gwynedd, reared in Swords as a close relative of the Hiberno-Norse Kings of Dublin and grandson of King Brian Boru
  - Robert FitzRery, Attorney-General for Ireland from 1450 to 1463, came from a long-established Swords family which claimed descent from Gruffudd ap Cynan.
- Eleanor Ambrose, Catholic heiress, is from Swords.
- Conan Byrne, A retired League of Ireland Footballer.
- Ed Byrne, comedian, is from Swords.
- Jason Byrne, comedian, lives in Swords.
- Duncan Campbell, video artist, won 2014 Turner Prize, grew up in Swords.
- Bill Cullen, businessman, presenter of the TV show, "The Apprentice", owns and works at Europa Academy in Swords.
- Zack Elbouzedi, Irish footballer for AIK Fotboll
- Jamie Finn, Irish footballer for Birmingham City W.F.C.
- Paul Flynn, Dublin and Fingallians GAA player, lives in Swords.
- Ronan Keating, singer-songwriter, lived in the Highfields residential development on the town's southern side.
- Peter Kioso, footballer for Peterborough United, born in Swords
- Kodaline, a popular band, come from Swords
- Richard Montgomery, hero of the American Revolution, born in Swords.
- Lorcan Morris, professional golf caddie, is from Swords.
- Chris Newman, actor known for his roles in Song for a Raggy Boy and Red Rock
- Sean Roughan, footballer for Lincoln City, born in Swords
- Blessed Francis Taylor, former mayor of Dublin, martyr, born in Swords.
- Keith Ward, footballer for Shelbourne FC

== See also ==
- List of abbeys and priories in County Dublin
- List of towns and villages in Ireland
