= Charles Cobbe (politician) =

Irish politician (1756–1798)

Member of Parliament for Swords
- In office January 1798 – 9 July 1798 Serving with Francis Synge
- Preceded by: John Claudius Beresford; Eyre Massey
- Succeeded by: Francis Synge; Marcus Beresford
- In office 1783–1790 Serving with John Hatch
- Preceded by: Thomas Cobbe; Charles King
- Succeeded by: John Claudius Beresford; Eyre Massey

Personal details
- Born: 1756
- Died: 9 July 1798 (aged 41–42)
- Spouse: Anne Power Trench (m. 1778)
- Relations: Eliza Dorothea Cobbe, Lady Tuite (sister); Marcus Beresford, 1st Earl of Tyrone (grandfather); Charles Cobbe (grandfather); John Rawdon, 1st Earl of Moira (uncle); George Beresford, 1st Marquess of Waterford (uncle); John Beresford (uncle); William Beresford, 1st Baron Decies (uncle)
- Children: 5
- Parent(s): Thomas Cobbe; Lady Eliza Beresford

Charles Cobbe (1756 – 9 July 1798), of Newbridge, was an Irish politician.

== Early life ==
He was the only son of Thomas Cobbe and Lady Eliza Beresford. One sister, Catherine Cobbe, married Hon. Henry Pelham (son of Thomas Pelham, 1st Earl of Chichester) and the other, Elizabeth Dorothea Cobbe, married Sir Henry Tuite, 8th Baronet.

His paternal grandparents were The Most Reverend Charles Cobbe, Archbishop of Dublin and Primate of Ireland, and Dorothea (née Levinge), Lady Rawdon, a daughter of Sir Richard Levinge, 1st Baronet and widow of Sir John Rawdon. From his grandmother's first marriage, his half-uncle was John Rawdon, 1st Earl of Moira. His maternal grandparents were Marcus Beresford, 1st Earl of Tyrone, and Lady Catherine Power, suo jure Baroness La Poer. Among his maternal family were uncles George Beresford, 1st Marquess of Waterford, John Beresford, MP, and William Beresford, 1st Baron Decies.

== Career ==
Cobbe represented Swords in the Parliament of Ireland from 1783 to 1790; and again from January 1798 until his death later that year on 9 July 1798. His seat in Parliament was taken over by his cousin, Marcus Beresford, who held it until the Act of Union 1800.

== Personal life ==
In 1778, Cobbe married Anne Power Trench (d. 1835), daughter of Richard Trench, MP, and Frances Power. Her brother was William Trench, 1st Earl of Clancarty. Together, they were the parents of five sons:

- Charles Cobbe (1781–1857), High Sheriff of County Dublin who married Frances Conway, daughter of Capt. Thomas Conway of Morden Park, in 1809.
- George Cobbe (1782–1865), a General in the Royal Artillery who married Amelia Barton, daughter of Rev. Royston Barton.
- Henry Cobbe (d. 1823), a reverend who served as Vicar at Templeton.
- Thomas Alexander Cobbe (1788–1836), a Colonel in the East India Company who married Nuzzeer Begum Khan, daughter of Azeeze Khan.
- William Power Cobbe (1790–1831), a captain in the Royal Navy who married Elizabeth Bridget Starkey, daughter of Richard Fortescue Starkey, MP.

Like his father, Cobbe ran up considerable debts before predeceasing his father when he died in 1798. Because of his debts, his father sold some estates in County Louth and their large townhouse in Palace Row.

Parliament of Ireland
Preceded by John Claudius Beresford; Eyre Massey	Member of Parliament for Swords; 1798; With: Francis Synge	Succeeded by Francis Synge; Marcus Beresford
Preceded by Thomas Cobbe; Charles King	Member of Parliament for Swords; 1783–1790; With: John Hatch	Succeeded by John Claudius Beresford; Eyre Massey
