= Thomas Cobbe =

Irish politician (1733–1814)

Member of Parliament for Swords
- In office 1776–1783 Serving with Charles King
- Preceded by: John Hatch; John Damer
- Succeeded by: John Claudius Beresford; Eyre Massey
- In office 1759–1768 Serving with Hon. Bysse Molesworth, Hamilton Gorges
- Preceded by: Hon. Bysse Molesworth; Edward Bolton
- Succeeded by: John Hatch; John Damer

Personal details
- Born: 1733 London, England
- Died: 1814 (aged 80–81)
- Spouse: Lady Eliza Beresford (m. 1751; died 1806)
- Relations: John Rawdon, 1st Earl of Moira (half-brother); Sir Richard Levinge, 1st Baronet (grandfather)
- Children: Charles Cobbe; Catherine Pelham; Eliza Dorothea Cobbe, Lady Tuite
- Parent(s): Charles Cobbe; Dorothea Levinge

Thomas Cobbe (1733–1814), of the Newbridge Demesne in north County Dublin, was an Irish politician.

== Early life ==
Cobbe was born in London in 1733 into the prominent Cobbe family. His mother, Dorothea Levinge, a daughter of Sir Richard Levinge, 1st Baronet, died during childbirth, and his father was the Most Reverend Charles Cobbe, Archbishop of Dublin. Before his parents marriage, his mother was the widow of Sir John Rawdon, of Moira, County Down, with whom she had two sons: John, later Earl of Moira, and Arthur Rawdon. From his parents marriage, he had an elder brother, Charles Cobbe, who died in 1750.

He was educated at Trinity College, Dublin.

== Career ==
Cobbe represented Swords in the Parliament of Ireland from 1759 to 1768; and again from 1776 to 1783.

Cobbe and his wife extended Newbridge House and to house their picture collection built the red drawing-room that remains one of the finest 18th-century interiors in Ireland.

== Personal life ==
In 1751, Cobbe married Lady Eliza Beresford (1736–1806), a younger daughter of Marcus Beresford, 1st Earl of Tyrone, and Lady Catherine Power, suo jure Baroness La Poer. Among her siblings were George Beresford, 1st Marquess of Waterford, John Beresford, MP, and William Beresford, 1st Baron Decies. Together, they were the parents of:

- Charles Cobbe (1756–1798), who married Anne Power Trench, daughter of Richard Trench, MP, and Frances Power, in 1778. Her brother was William Trench, 1st Earl of Clancarty.
- Catherine Cobbe (c. 1765–1839), who married Hon. Henry Pelham, son of Thomas Pelham, 1st Earl of Chichester, in 1788.
- Elizabeth Dorothea Cobbe (c. 1765–1850), who married Sir Henry Tuite, 8th Baronet, son of Sir Henry Tuite, 6th Baronet, in 1784.

Lady Eliza died in England on 6 May 1806. Cobbe died in 1814.

Parliament of Ireland
Preceded by John Hatch; John Damer	Member of Parliament for Swords; 1776–1783; With: Charles King	Succeeded by John Claudius Beresford; Eyre Massey
Preceded by Hon. Bysse Molesworth; Edward Bolton	Member of Parliament for Swords; 1759–1768; With: Hon. Bysse Molesworth (1759–1761); Hamilton Gorges (1761–1768)	Succeeded by John Hatch; John Damer
