= François de La Rochefoucauld, Marquis de Montandre =

British field marshal and soldier (1672–1739)

Field Marshal The Marquis de Montandre PC (Ire)
- de La Rochefoucauld's arms
- Born: September 1672
- Died: 11 August 1739 (aged 66); Grosvenor Square, London
- Military career
- Allegiance: Kingdom of England; Kingdom of Great Britain
- Branch: English Army; British Army
- Service years: 1692–1739
- Rank: Field Marshal
- Conflicts: Williamite War in Ireland; Nine Years' War; War of the Spanish Succession

Field Marshal François de La Rochefoucauld, Marquis de Montandre, also known as Francis de La Rochefoucauld, (September 1672 – 11 August 1739) was a British soldier, who arrived in England as a Huguenot refugee. After serving as a junior officer during the Williamite War in Ireland, he was given command of Francis du Cambon's Regiment of Foot and led his regiment in the Low Countries during the Nine Years' War . He also fought at the Siege of Badajoz and at the Battle of Alcantara during the War of the Spanish Succession. He went on to be Master General of the Ordnance in Ireland.

== Military career ==
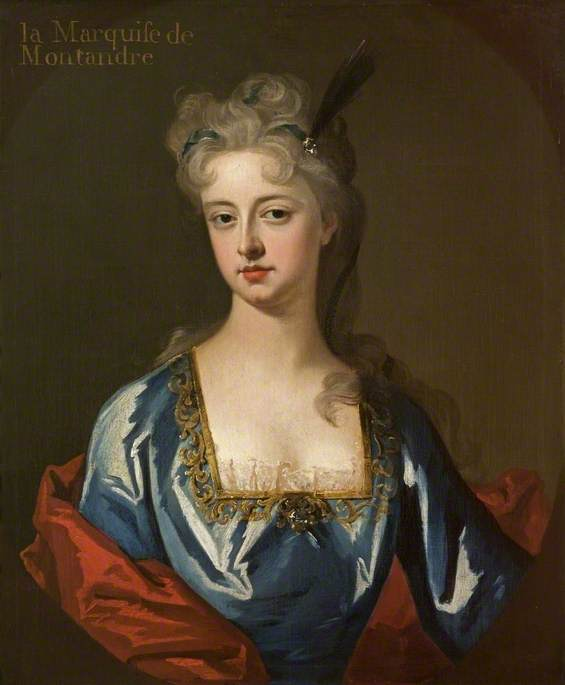
Mary Anne Spanheim, wife of de la Rochefoucauld

Born the son of Charles-Louis de La Rochefoucauld, 2nd marquis of Montandre of the Doudeauville branch of the family and Madeline-Anne de La Rochefoucauld (née Pithou), de La Rochefoucauld was brought up in France as a Roman Catholic but converted to Protestantism. After arriving in England as a Huguenot refugee in the aftermath of the Edict of Fontainebleau of 1685, La Rochefoucauld joined William III's Army and served under the Earl of Galway during the Williamite War in Ireland. He was commissioned as a brevet lieutenant colonel and given command of Francis du Cambon's Regiment of Foot on 15 February 1692. He went with his regiment to the Low Countries in September 1692 during the Nine Years' War and in 1702 succeeded his brother Isaac, who died without issue, as 4th marquis de Montandre.

La Rochefoucauld joined the staff of the Earl of Galway as a brigadier-general in 1704 and fought at the Siege of Badajoz in October 1705 and the Battle of Alcantara in April 1706 during the War of the Spanish Succession. Promoted to major-general in the English Army on 1 June 1706, he took part in the advance to Madrid in June 1706 and became colonel of Dungannon's Regiment in November 1706. He was given command of a brigade which landed in Portugal in June 1707 and led the brigade at the Battle of Caya in May 1709. On 29 September 1709 de La Rochefoucauld returned to London to report to Queen Anne on the course of operations in Portugal. Promoted to lieutenant general on 9 May 1710, he became colonel of a new regiment on the Irish establishment in 1715 but this regiment was disbanded in 1718.

La Rochefoucauld was appointed a Privy Counsellor of Ireland and became Master General of the Ordnance in Ireland in January 1727. Promoted to full general on 18 December 1735, he became Governor of Guernsey in September 1737. He was promoted to field marshal on 2 July 1739. He died at his home in Grosvenor Square in London on 11 August 1739 and was buried in Westminster Abbey. A new stone, quarried in Montendre and brought to London at the expense of the present Duc de La Rochefoucauld-Doudeauville, was placed over his grave on 15 January 2013.

== Family ==
In April 1710 de La Rochefoucauld married Mary Anne von Spanheim, daughter of Ezekiel, Freiherr von Spanheim (the Prussian ambassador to London); they had no children.

== Sources ==
- Genealogisch-historische Nachrichten, 1739, p.442f
- Heathcote, Tony (1999). The British Field Marshals 1736-1997. Pen & Sword Books Ltd. ISBN 0-85052-696-5.

French nobility
Preceded by Isaac Charles de La Rochefoucauld	Marquis of Montendre; 1702–1739	Succeeded by Louis de La Rochefoucauld
Military offices
Preceded by Viscount Mountjoy	Master General of the Ordnance in Ireland; 1727–1739	Succeeded by Viscount Molesworth
Government offices
Preceded by Richard Sutton	Governor of Guernsey; 1737–1739	Succeeded by The Earl of Pomfret
