= Cobbe family =

Irish family

The Cobbe heraldic pelican, motto In Sanguine Vita, part of the family coat of arms.

The Cobbe family is an Irish landed family. The family has a notable history, and has produced several prominent Irish politicians, clergymen, writers, activists and soldiers, such as philosopher, writer and social reformer Frances Power Cobbe and General Sir Alexander Cobbe VC.

== Family history ==
The Cobbes were originally from Steventon, Swarraton, Hampshire, with roots traceable back to the 13th century, possibly including a Richard Cobbe, priest of St. Martin's Church, Winchester in 1323, a Robert Cobbe at the Siege of Calais and Battle of Crécy in 1346, and the Richard Cobbe who was Vice-President of Corpus Christi College, Oxford and bequeathed a legacy to the college on his death in 1597. The earliest individual from whom descent is clearly documented is William Cobbe of Steventon (c.1450). A later Richard Cobbe was Knight of the Shire for Hampshire in Cromwell's short Parliament of 1656. His son Thomas Cobbe, Receiver General for County Southampton, married the daughter of James Chaloner, grandson of the Elizabethan poet and statesman Sir Thomas Chaloner. James Chaloner was briefly Governor of the Isle of Man and author of A Short Treatise on the Isle of Man, and some sources indicate that Thomas Cobbe himself later also carried that title.

The founder of the Cobbe family in Ireland was Charles Cobbe, son of Thomas, Archbishop of Dublin and Primate of Ireland, who served as viceregal chaplain to his cousin Charles Paulet, 2nd Duke of Bolton the Lord Lieutenant of Ireland, moved from Winchester and established the Newbridge Estate outside Dublin in 1736. This remained the family home until 1985, after being acquired by Fingal County Council in a unique arrangement with the family, who continue to maintain it as a family home.

The son of Archbishop Charles Cobbe and his wife Dorothy Levinge, daughter of Sir Richard Levinge, 1st Baronet, was Colonel Thomas Cobbe MP (1733–1815). He and his wife, Lady Eliza Beresford, daughter of the Earl of Tyrone, extended Newbridge House and to house their picture collection built the Red Drawing-room that remains one of the finest 18th-century interiors in Ireland. He was predeceased by his son, Charles Cobbe MP (1756–1798). The great-grandson of Archbishop Cobbe was Charles Cobbe (1781–1857) who is notable mainly as having kept extensive diaries chronicling the life of a rural landlord and his tenants. He served briefly in India under Arthur Wellesley, later the Duke of Wellington. The diarist Charles Cobbe's younger brother, Thomas Alexander Cobbe, married the Nuzeer Begum, daughter of Aziz Khan of Kashmir, part of the Indian nobility, and traded indigo to Britain in addition to work in the East India Company.

In 2011 the family has come to attention as being the possessors of the Cobbe portrait, claimed to be the sole remaining portrait of William Shakespeare painted from life, which has provoked considerable scholastic discussion.

=== Family Tree ===
- Charles Cobbe (1686–1765), Archbishop of Dublin.
- Eliza Dorothea Cobbe, Lady Tuite (1764–1850), poet.
- Frances Power Cobbe (1822–1904), philosopher, writer, social reformer and suffragist. Founded a number of animal advocacy groups, including the British Union for the Abolition of Vivisection (BUAV) in 1898, was a member of the executive council of the London National Society for Women's Suffrage, and authored a large number of influential philosophical and religious works.
- General Sir Alexander Cobbe VC GCB KCSI DSO (1870–1931), recipient of the Victoria Cross, the highest and most prestigious award for gallantry in the face of the enemy that can be awarded to British and Commonwealth forces.
- Anne Cobbe (1920–1971), mathematician. Pure Mathematics tutor at Somerville College, Oxford.
- Hugh Cobbe OBE (b. 1942), last private owner of Newbridge House, formerly with the British Library, father of the Countess of Dalkeith.

== Other Cobbs and Cobbes in Ireland ==
Genealogical records indicate the existence of other Cobb and Cobbe families in Ireland, including French refugees during the Huguenot settlements in Ireland who settled in Portarlington, County Laois.

== See also ==
- Newbridge Estate
- Irish nobility
