= 1706 in Spain =

- Decades: 1680s; 1690s; 1700s; 1710s; 1720s
- See also: History of Spain; Timeline of Spanish history; List of years in Spain

Events in the year 1706 in Spain.

The Siege of Barcelona

== Incumbents ==
- Monarch: Philip V

== Events ==
- April 3–27 - Siege of Barcelona
- April - Siege of Alcántara
