= Hamilton Gorges =

Hamilton Gorges may refer to:

- Hamilton Gorges (1711–1786), Anglo-Irish MP
- Hamilton Gorges (1737–1802), Anglo-Irish MP
