= Kister =

Kister or Kisters is a surname. Notable people with this surname include:

- Gerry H. Kisters (1919–1986), American soldier
- Jack Kister, American electrical engineer, developer of VMEbus
- Jane Kister (1944–2019), British-American mathematician
- Kenneth Kister (1935–2022), American library scientist
- Meir Jacob Kister (1914–2010), Jewish Arabist from Poland
- Tim Kister (born 1986), German footballer
