= John Claudius Beresford =

Irish politician (1766–1846)

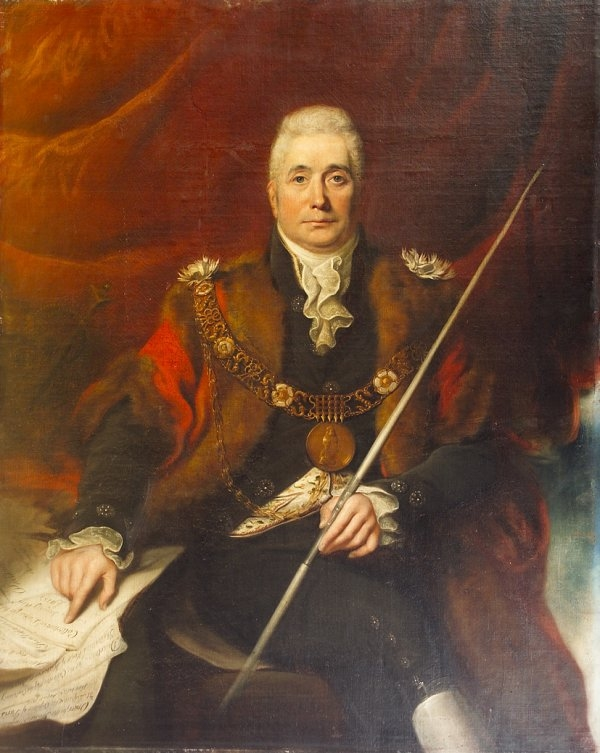
- Beresford in 1814

Lord Mayor of Dublin
- In office 1814–1815
- Preceded by: John Cash
- Succeeded by: Robert Shaw

Member of Parliament for County Waterford
- In office 6 January 1806 – June 1811

Member of Parliament for Dublin City Irish Parliament (1798–1801)
- In office 1798–1804

Member of Parliament for Swords
- In office 1790–1798

Personal details
- Born: 23 October 1766
- Died: 20 July 1846 (aged 79)
- Party: Tory
- Spouse: Elizabeth McKenzie Menzies
- Children: 5
- Parent: John Beresford (father)
- Education: Trinity College Dublin

Military service
- Allegiance: Kingdom of Ireland
- Branch/service: Yeomanry
- Battles/wars: Irish Rebellion of 1798

John Claudius Beresford (23 October 1766 – 20 July 1846) was an Irish Tory Member of the UK Parliament representing Dublin City 1801–1804 and County Waterford 1806–1811.

== Early life ==
Beresford was educated at Trinity College Dublin. From 1783, Beresford served as a storekeeper for the port of Dublin. He was subsequently appointed to a wealthy sinecure post of Inspector-General of Exports and Imports. He was returned by his father, Hon. John Beresford, for the family borough of Swords to the Irish House of Commons in 1790. In 1798 he was returned for Dublin City, helped by his position in the port, and as a partner in a leading Dublin bank and a member of Dublin Corporation.

== 1798 rebellion ==
During the United Irishman rebellion of 1798, Beresford led a yeoman battalion which fought against the rebels with a particular ferocity. He kept a riding school in Dublin, which acquired an evil reputation as the chief scene of the floggings by which evidence was extorted from the United Irishmen. As such, he became identified as one of the leading opponents of the rebellion, and the rebels deliberately burnt the banknotes issued by his bank. His reputation for persecuting political opponents survived throughout his political career.

He took a prominent part in the Irish House of Commons, where he unsuccessfully moved the reduction of the proposed Irish contribution to the imperial exchequer in the debates on the Act of Union. He was to the last an ardent opponent of the union (taking the opposite position to his father); he resigned his post at the port on 25 January 1799 so as not to be tainted by it or by the suggestion that his actions were motivated by a desire to retain it.

== Union ==
Under a provision of the Act of Union 1800 he retained his seat in the 1st Parliament of the United Kingdom 1801–02 without a fresh election, and in the Union Parliament he was a supporter of William Pitt the younger and later Henry Addington; he had to give up his Irish business interests to play a full part in Parliamentary business. He was re-elected at the general election of 1802, being top of the poll.

On 3 June 1803 Beresford was the only previous supporter of the government to desert them and support a censure motion moved by Peter Patten, making a speech in support which was regarded as "absurd" by the Chief Secretary to the Lord Lieutenant for Ireland. In March 1804, Beresford was appointed to the Irish currency committee, and therefore resigned his seat by accepting the Escheatorship of Ulster, a sinecure office of profit under the Crown (see Resignation from the British House of Commons for details of the procedure).

== Impact on Irish politics ==
After the death of his father on 5 November 1805 Beresford returned to Parliament by winning the by-election to replace him as MP for County Waterford (6 January 1806). Politically, he allied to a family faction of the Marquess of Waterford, under the leadership of Henry de La Poer Beresford; the faction aimed at trying to stop the government from giving power in Ireland to the Ponsonby family. Beresford was the chief spokesman for his group in their meetings with Ministers.

Although expected to go into opposition in 1806, Beresford in fact supported the government, because a run on funds at his bank left him in need of government support for credit. His support led to his re-election at the 1806 general election in a contested election. This was a controversial decision within the government, with the Duke of Bedford admitting that Beresford had been guilty of persecution but believing he was now loyal, while Lord Howick believed it unlikely that he could be relied upon.

Howick turned out to be correct. In 1807 Beresford did not support the government, and became a supporter of the Duke of Portland before his accession to the premiership later that year. He was unopposed in the 1807 general election. He was however erratic, and some of his speeches were reckoned as doing more harm than good to the government's cause. He strongly supported government against the proposal that peace negotiations with France be begun in 1809.

== Later life ==
In January 1811 Beresford suffered a further severe financial crisis which prevented his attendance at Parliament for some months. In June he resigned his seat through appointment as Escheator of Munster, being succeeded by his kinsman, Major General Sir William Carr Beresford. The next year, Beresford attempted to get a government appointment but was refused as he already had a good pension. Beresford served as Lord Mayor of Dublin in 1814–15, where he was known for his "princely hospitality", but thereafter withdrew from public life.

Parliament of Ireland
Preceded by Charles Cobbe; John Hatch	Member of Parliament for Swords; 1790–1798; With: Eyre Massey	Succeeded by Francis Synge; Charles Cobbe
Preceded by Lord Henry FitzGerald; Henry Grattan	Member of Parliament for Dublin City; 1798–1801; With: Arthur Wolfe 1798; George Ogle 1798–1801	Succeeded by Parliament of the United Kingdom
Civic offices
Preceded by John Cash	Lord Mayor of Dublin; 1814–1815	Succeeded by Robert Shaw
