= John Hatch (politician) =

Irish politician (1720-1797)

Member of Parliament for Swords
- In office 1768–1776 Serving with John Damer
- Preceded by: Hamilton Gorges; Thomas Cobbe
- Succeeded by: Thomas Cobbe; Charles King
- In office 1783–1790 Serving with Charles Cobbe
- Preceded by: Thomas Cobbe; Charles King
- Succeeded by: John Claudius Beresford; Eyre Massey

Personal details
- Born: Around 1720
- Died: 1797 (aged 76–77) Dublin
- Spouse: Barbara Synge (m. 1765; her presumed death 1767)
- Relations: John Millington Synge (great-great-grandson)
- Children: Dorothy Synge-Hutchinson; Elizabeth Synge
- Parent: Henry Hatch

John Hatch (around 1720–1797) was an Irish politician, land agent and developer based in Dublin. He was a member of parliament for Swords.

He is best known today for the layout and construction of Harcourt Street and the eponymous Hatch street.

== Early life ==
Hatch was born around 1720, the son of Henry Hatch, a land agent on large estates. Henry was originally from the County Louth–Monaghan area, but resided in Dublin's Peter Street. He entered Trinity College Dublin in 1736, graduating in 1739. He was called to the Bar in 1749.

== Career ==
Upon the death of his father in 1762, Hatch inherited his fortune and took on his agenting work. In 1768, he became seneschal of the Liberty of St. Sepulchre, acting as agent for the land belonging to the Archbishop of Dublin attached to his palace in Kevin Street.

This gave Hatch a central position in Dublin planning. At the time the centre of the city was shifting eastward. This followed the building of the Royal Exchange in 1769 and the positioning of the Custom House in 1774. It was the period of the Wide Streets Commission and the construction of many of Dublin's characteristic Georgian streets.

Having secured land from the Liberty, Hatch laid out a plan for a new street running from Stephen's Green towards the Circular Road to the south. It was laid out from 1777, and first appears on maps in 1784. By 1791, he had extended the street to its full length. He lived at Number 40, and sold Number 17 to Judge John Scott. He also developed the adjacent Hatch Street, which runs from Harcourt Street to Leeson Street.

Hatch was elected to the Irish House of Commons for the constituency of Swords in the 1768 Irish general election. He lost the seat in the 1776 election, but resumed it from 1783 until 1790. He served as secretary to the Revenue Commissioners, director of the Grand Canal Company and as a member of the board of governors of the Dublin Workhouse at stages through his career.

== Personal life ==
Hatch married Barbara Synge, daughter of the Bishop of Killaloe, in 1765. They had two daughters, Dorothy (married Rev. Sir Samuel Synge-Hutchinson, 3rd Baronet Hutchinson), and Elizabeth (married Francis Synge). Barbara disappeared from records in 1767 and her death is referred to in later sources during Hatch's lifetime.

During his marriage, Hatch lived on the southwest corner of Stephen's Green, near the beginning of the future Harcourt Street. He also owned Lissenhall House in Swords, which he made infrequent use of. His trips out of Dublin to tend to estate business were also infrequent.

He later lived at one of the largest houses on Harcourt Street, number 40.

Hatch died in 1797 without a will, but ultimately left substantial property to his son-in-law Synge. The playwright John Millington Synge and the scientists John Lighton Synge and Edward Hutchinson Synge are his direct descendants.
