= Frances Power Cobbe =

Philosopher and women's suffrage and animal welfare activist (1822–1904)

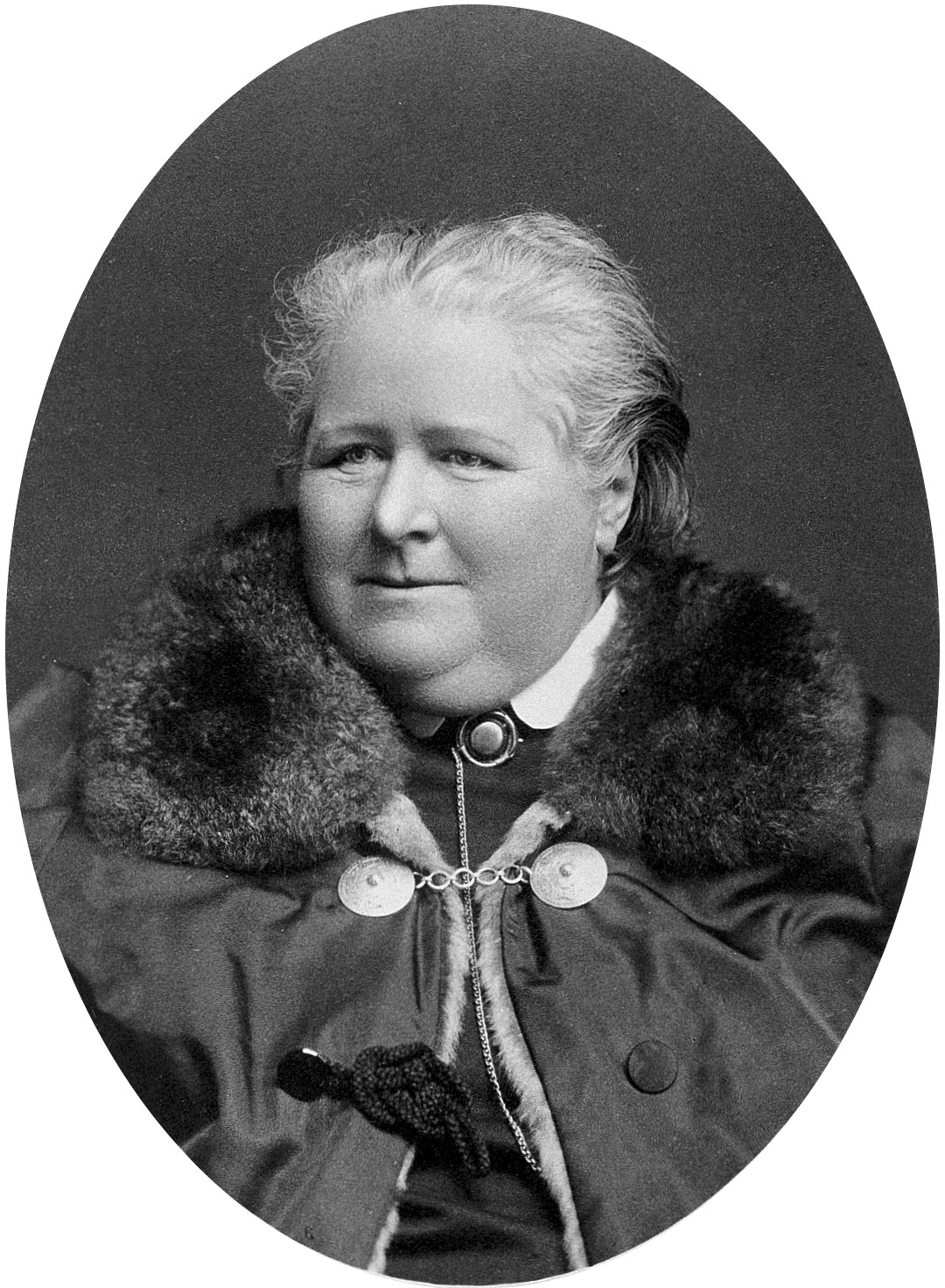
- Portrait from Life of Frances Power Cobbe, 1894
- Born: 4 December 1822; Newbridge House, County Dublin, Ireland
- Died: 5 April 1904 (aged 81); Hengwrt, Wales
- Occupations: Writer, social reformer, philosopher
- Known for: Founding the Society for the Protection of Animals Liable to Vivisection (1875) and British Union for the Abolition of Vivisection (1898); Being a member of the executive council of the London National Society for Women's Suffrage

Frances Power Cobbe (4 December 1822 – 5 April 1904) was an Anglo-Irish writer, philosopher, religious thinker, social reformer, anti-vivisection activist and leading women's suffrage campaigner. She founded a number of animal advocacy groups, including the National Anti-Vivisection Society (NAVS) in 1875 and the British Union for the Abolition of Vivisection (BUAV) in 1898, and was a member of the executive council of the London National Society for Women's Suffrage.

== Life ==
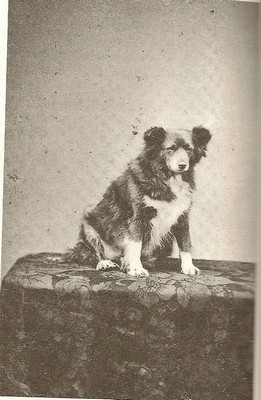
Hajjin was Frances Power Cobbe's canine companion and travelled with her and her partner, Mary Lloyd, to Wales after Cobbe and Lloyd moved there

Frances Power Cobbe was a member of the prominent Cobbe family, descended from Archbishop Charles Cobbe, Primate of Ireland. She was born in Newbridge House in the family estate in present-day Donabate, County Dublin. Her niece Frances Conway Cobbe was one of the first 12 students at the newly founded women's college Somerville Hall (later Somerville College) in Oxford.

Cobbe was educated mainly at home by governesses with a brief period at a school in Brighton. She studied English literature, French, German, Italian, music, and the Bible. She then read heavily in the family library especially in religion and theology, joined several subscription libraries, and studied Greek and geometry with a local clergyman. She organised her own study schedule and ended up very well educated.

In the late 1830s, Cobbe went through a crisis of faith. The humane theology of Theodore Parker, an American transcendentalist and abolitionist, restored her faith (she went on later to edit Parker's collected writings). She began to set out her ideas in what became an Essay on True Religion. Her father disapproved and for a while expelled her from the home. She kept studying and writing anyway and eventually revised the Essay into her first book, the Essay on Intuitive Morals. The first volume came out anonymously in 1855.

In 1857, Cobbe's father died and left her an annuity. She took the chance to travel on her own around parts of Europe and the Near East. This took her to Italy where she met a community of similarly independent women: Isa Blagden with whom she went on briefly to share a house, the sculptor Harriet Hosmer, the poet Elizabeth Barrett Browning, the painter Rosa Bonheur, the scientist Mary Somerville and the Welsh sculptor who became her partner, Mary Lloyd. In letters and published writing, Cobbe referred to Lloyd alternately as "husband," "wife," and "dear friend." Cobbe also formed a lasting attachment to Italy and went there regularly. She contributed many newspaper and journal articles on Italy, some of which became her 1864 book Italics.

Returning to England, Cobbe tried working at the Red Lodge Reformatory and living with the owner, Mary Carpenter, from 1858 to 1859. The turbulent relationship between the two resulted in Cobbe leaving the school and moving out.

Cobbe now focused on writing and began to publish her first articles in Victorian periodicals. She quickly became very successful and was able to support herself by writing. She and Lloyd began to live together in London. Cobbe kept up a steady stream of journal essays, many of them reissued as books. She became a leading writer for the London newspaper The Echo (London). Cobbe became involved in feminist campaigns for the vote, for women to be admitted to study at university on the same terms as men, and for married women's property rights. She was on the executive council of the London National Society for Women's Suffrage. Her 1878 essay Wife-Torture in England influenced the passage of the 1878 Matrimonial Causes Act, which gave women of violent husbands the right to a legal separation.

Cobbe became very concerned about the rise of animal experimentation or vivisection and founded the Victoria Street Society, which later became the National Anti-Vivisection Society, in 1875. The organisation campaigned for laws to regulate vivisection. She and her allies had already prepared a draft bill, Henniker's Bill, presented to parliament in 1875. They proposed regular inspections of licensed premises and that experimenters must always use anaesthetics except under time-limited personal licences. In response Charles Darwin, Thomas Henry Huxley, John Burdon Sanderson and others drafted a rival Playfair's Bill which proposed a lighter system of regulation. Ultimately the Cruelty to Animals Act, 1876 introduced a compromise system. Cobbe found it so watered-down that she gave up on regulation and began to campaign for the abolition of vivisection. The anti-vivisection movement became split between the abolitionists and the moderates. Cobbe later came to think the Victoria Street Society had become too moderate and started the British Union for the Abolition of Vivisection in 1898.

In 1884, Cobbe and Lloyd retired to Hengwrt in Wales. Cobbe stayed there after Lloyd died in 1896. Cobbe continued to publish and campaign right until her death. However her friend, the writer Blanche Atkinson, wrote, “The sorrow of Miss Lloyd's death changed the whole aspect of existence for Miss Cobbe. The joy of life had gone. It had been such a friendship as is rarely seen – perfect in love, sympathy, and mutual understand.” They are buried together at Saint Illtyd Church Cemetery, Llanelltyd, Gwynedd, Wales.

In her will, Cobbe bequeathed all the copyrights of her works to Atkinson.

== Thought and ideas ==
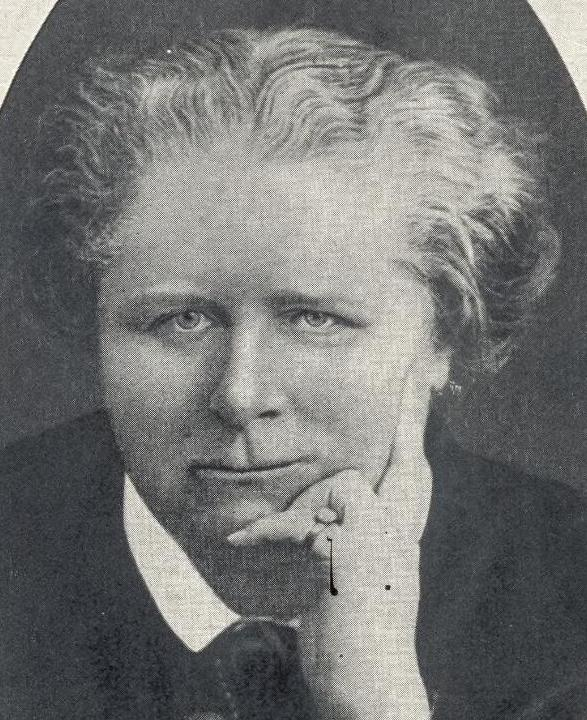

In Cobbe's first book An Essay on Intuitive Morals, vol. 1, she combined Kantian ethics, theism, and intuitionism. She had encountered Kant in the early 1850s. She argued that the key concept in ethics is duty, that duties presuppose a moral law, and a moral law presupposes an absolute moral legislator - God. She argued that we know by intuition what the law requires us to do. We can trust our intuition because it is "God's tuition". We can do what the law requires because we have noumenal selves as well as being in the world of phenomena. She rejected eudaimonism and utilitarianism.

Cobbe applied her moral theory to animal rights, first in The Rights of Man and the Claims of Brutes from 1863. She argued that humans may do harm to animals in order to satisfy real wants but not from mere "wantonness". For example, humans may eat meat but not kill birds for feathers to decorate hats. The harm or pain inflicted must be the minimum possible. For Cobbe this set limits to vivisection, for example, it must always be done under anesthesia.

Cobbe engaged with Darwinism. She had met the Darwin family in 1868. Emma Darwin liked her, saying "Miss Cobbe was very agreeable." Cobbe persuaded Charles Darwin to read Immanuel Kant's Metaphysics of Morals. Darwin had a review copy of Descent of Man sent to her (as well as to Alfred Russel Wallace and St. George Jackson Mivart. This led to her critique of Darwin, Darwinism in Morals, in The Theological Review in April 1871. Cobbe thought morality could not be explained by evolution and needed reference to God. Darwin could show why we do feel sympathy for others, but not why we ought to feel it.

However, the debate with Darwin led Cobbe to revise her views about duties to animals. She started to think that sympathy was central and we must above all treat animals in ways that show sympathy for them. Vivisection violated this. She also introduced a distinction between sympathy and what she called heteropathy, similar to hostility or cruelty. She thought we naturally have cruel instincts that found an outlet in vivisection. Religion in contrast cultivated sympathy, but science was undermining it. This became part of a wide-ranging account of the direction of European civilisation.

These were just some of the huge range of philosophical topics on which Cobbe wrote. They included aesthetics, philosophy of mind, philosophy of religion, history, pessimism, life after death, and many more. Her books included The Pursuits of Women (1863), Essays New and Old on Ethical and Social Subjects (1865), Darwinism in Morals, and other Essays (1872), The Hopes of the Human Race (1874), The Duties of Women (1881), The Peak in Darien, with some other Inquiries touching concerns of the Soul and the Body (1882), The Scientific Spirit of the Age (1888) and The Modern Rack: Papers on Vivisection (1889), as well as her autobiography.

== Legacy ==
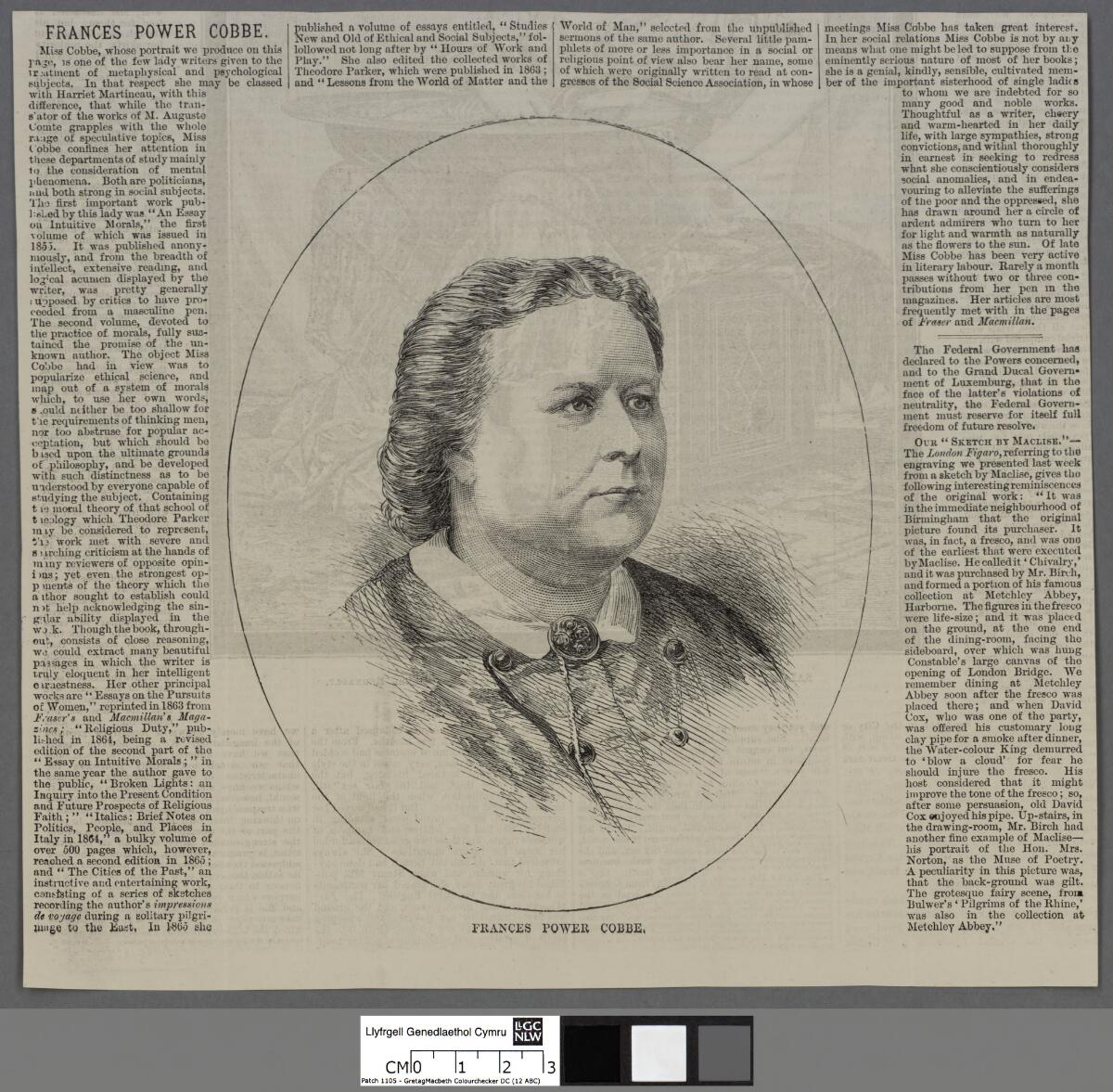

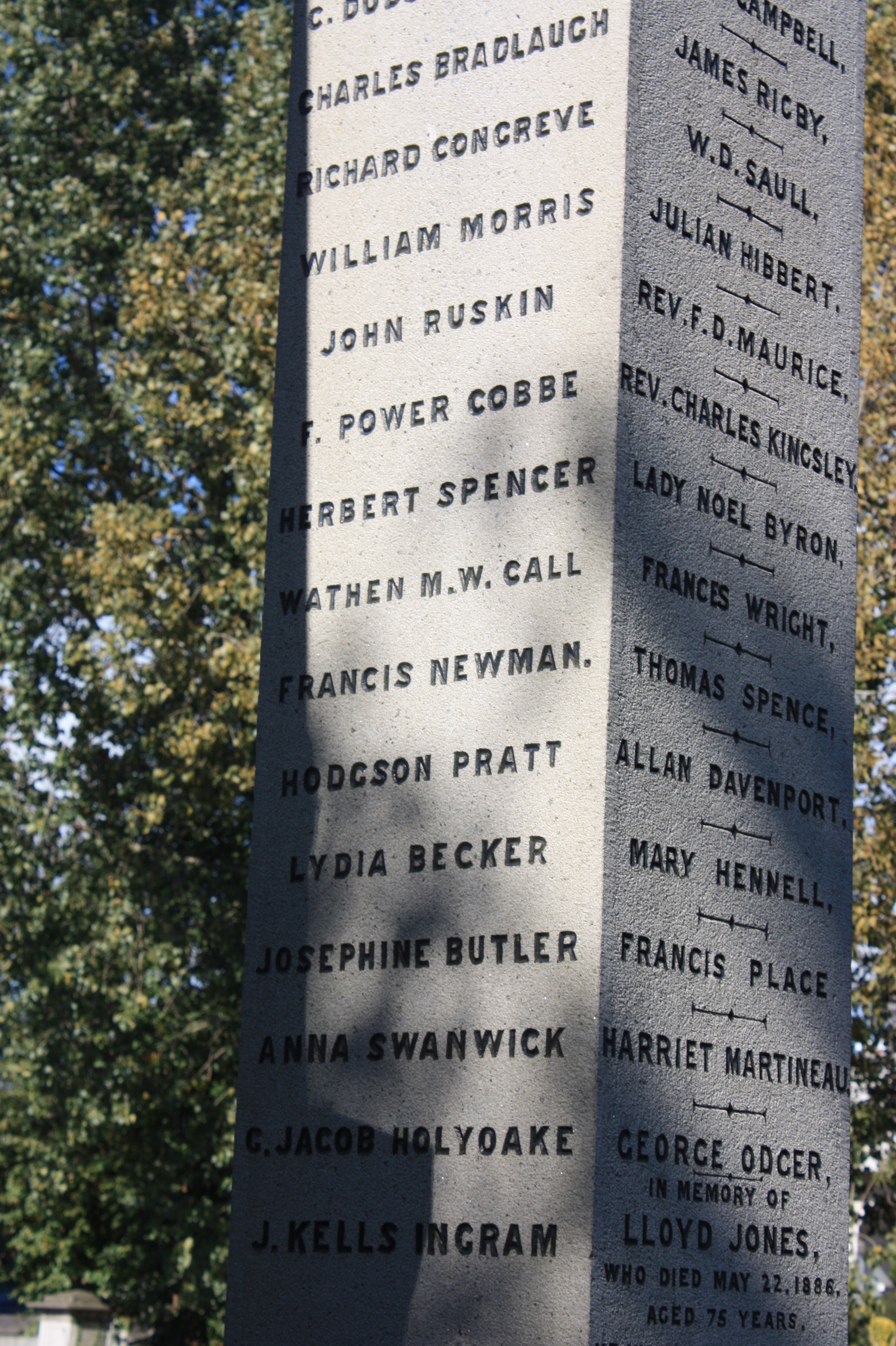
Lower section of the Reformers’ memorial in Kensal Green Cemetery, featuring Cobbe's name

In the late nineteenth century Cobbe was very well known for her philosophical views. For example, Margaret Oliphant in The Victorian Age of English Literature, when discussing philosophy, said "There are few ladies to be found among these ranks, but the name of Miss Frances Power Cobbe may be mentioned as that of a clear writer and profound thinker".

A portrait of her is included in a mural by Walter P. Starmer unveiled in 1921 in the church of St Jude-on-the-Hill in Hampstead Garden Suburb, London.

Her name and picture (and those of 58 other women's suffrage supporters) are on the plinth of the statue of Millicent Fawcett in Parliament Square, London, unveiled in 2018.

Her name is listed (as F. Power Cobbe) on the Reformers’ Memorial in Kensal Green Cemetery in London.

In 2020, the Graduate Theological Foundation established the Frances Power Cobbe Professorship of Animal Theology, named after Cobbe. Clair Linzey was appointed as its first holder.

Her philosophical contribution is now being rediscovered as part of the recovery of women in the history of philosophy.

== Bibliography ==
- The intuitive theory of morals. Theory of morals, 1855
- Essays on the pursuits of Woman, 1863
- The red flag in John bull's eyes, 1863
- The cities of the past, 1864
- Broken Lights: an Inquiry into the Present Condition and Future Prospects of Religious Faith, 1864
- Religious duty, 1864
- The confessions of a lost Dog, 1867
- Dawning Lights : an Inquiry Concerning the Secular Results of the New Reformation, 1867
- Criminals, Idiots, Women, and Minors, 1869
- Alone to the Alone: Prayers for Theists, 1871
- Darwinism in Morals, and Other Essays, 1872
- The Hopes of the Human Race, 1874
- The Moral Aspects of Vivisection, 1875
- The Age of Science: A Newspaper of the Twenthies Century, 1877
- The Duties of Women, 1881
- The Peak in Darien, 1882
- Life of Frances Power Cobbe as told by herself. Vol. I; Vol. II, 1894

== See also ==
- Brown Dog affair
- Lizzy Lind af Hageby
- Caroline Earle White
- List of animal rights advocates
- Women and animal advocacy
