= Eliza Dorothea Cobbe, Lady Tuite =

Irish author and poet

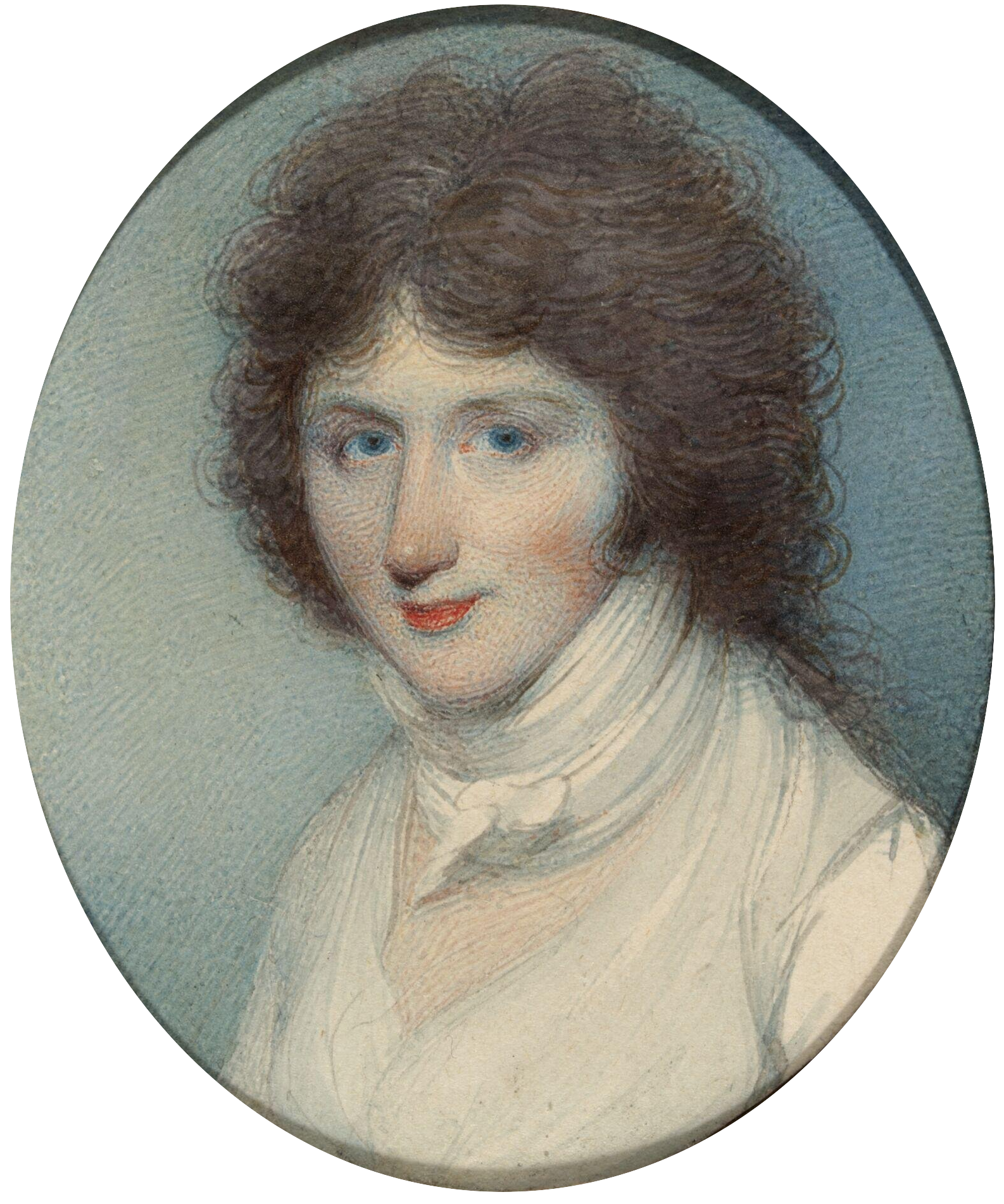
- 1796 miniature portrait by George Chinnery
- Born: 1764; Dublin, Ireland
- Died: 1850 (aged 85–86); Bath
- Occupations: Writer, Poet
- Writing career
- Pen name: Lady Tuite
- Genre: Romantic Poetry

Lady Eliza Dorothea Tuite (née Cobbe) (c. 1764–1850) was an Irish writer and poet. She was a member of the Anglo-Irish gentry, the distinguished Cobbe family.

== Life and work ==
Elizabeth Dorothea Cobbe was born circa 1764. She was the daughter of Colonel Thomas Cobbe and Lady Eliza Beresford. Lady Tuite married a naval officer, Sir Henry Tuite, 8th Baronet, in November 1784. He died in 1805.

Lady Tuite was a poet in the romantic style, her first book included five poems written 'as a sylph', an idea which came from the somewhat earlier style of work of Pope and Rowe. Others of her works discuss the value of war and honour of dying for a country. “Both poems and songs tend to be patriotic in theme with some of the longer poems providing vivid descriptions of social corruption and advocating reform."

She died in 1850, 45 years after her husband. When she was buried it was in the vault of her friend, Mrs Lysaght, and not beside her husband. She is thought to have been living in Bath at this time.

Lady Tuite was the granddaughter of the Most Reverend Charles Cobbe Archbishop of Dublin, and Dorothy Levinge. She was also related to Elizabeth Rawdon, Countess of Moira and was the great-aunt of Frances Power Cobbe, a noted Victorian reformer.

Lady Moira was known for holding intellectual salons, where Irish culture was discussed and promoted; this is discussed on the dedication page of her book Poems.

Power Cobbe visited her great-aunt in 1834 when she was still driving around Bath behind a four-horse team in her seventies. Her books were published when Power Cobbe was a teen and she is thought to have been an influence on the younger woman.

== Works ==
=== Poetry ===
- Poems. By Lady Tuite Tuite, Eliza Dorothea, Lady, London, 1796. (Second edition 1799)
- To a friend Tuite, Eliza Dorothea, Lady, 1782
- Miscellaneous Poetry Tuite, Eliza Dorothea, Lady, 1841

=== Children's books ===
- Edwina and Mary Tuite, Eliza Dorothea, Lady, 1838
