= Marcus Beresford (British Army officer, born 1764) =

Brigadier-General Marcus Beresford (1 June 1764 – 6 January 1803) was an Irish soldier and Member of Parliament.

== Early life ==
He was a son of the Archbishop of Tuam, William Beresford, by his wife Elizabeth, sister of John FitzGibbon, 1st Earl of Clare. He was educated at Trinity College, Dublin.

== Career ==
Beresford began his military career when he was commissioned as an ensign into the 9th Regiment of Foot on 26 October 1786. He was promoted to lieutenant on 30 June 1787 and then to captain in the 27th Regiment of Foot, later commanding an Independent Company.

On 31 October 1793, he was promoted to first major in the 102nd Regiment of Foot (Trench's) and on 26 November 1794 to lieutenant-colonel in the 135th Regiment of Foot (Sir Vere Hunt's). He was appointed Lieutenant-General of the Irish Ordnance in 1800 and promoted full colonel on 1 January 1801.

He represented St Canice in the Irish House of Commons from 1790 to 1794 and Swords from 1798 until the Act of Union 1800. On 22 June 1802, he was breveted to the local rank of brigadier-general in the Windward and Leeward Islands.

The West Indies garrisons were infamous for mortality through tropical diseases, such as malaria and yellow fever. Accordingly, Beresford made out a will on 23 November 1802 in Barbados. This proved to be a wise precaution, as he died there on 6 January.

== Personal life ==
He died unmarried, predeceasing his father, who was created Baron Decies in 1812 and succeeded by Marcus's younger brother John in 1819.

Parliament of Ireland
Preceded by John Monck Mason; Hon. Richard Annesley	Member of Parliament for St Canice; 1790–1794; With: John Monck Mason	Succeeded by John Monck Mason; Sylvester Douglas
Preceded by Francis Synge; Charles Cobbe	Member of Parliament for Swords; 1798–1800; With: Francis Synge	Constituency abolished
Government offices
Preceded by Thomas Pakenham	Lieutenant-General of the Irish Ordnance; 1800	Office abolished
