= 1704 in Spain =

- Decades: 1680s; 1690s; 1700s; 1710s; 1720s
- See also: History of Spain; Timeline of Spanish history; List of years in Spain

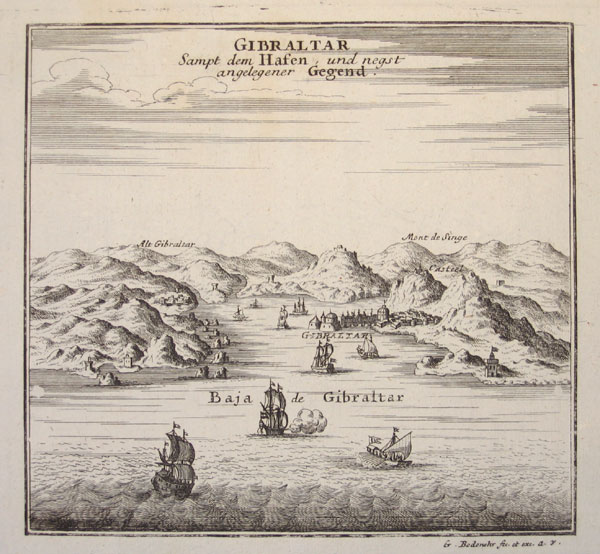
Bay of Gibraltar 18th century engraving

Events in the year 1704 in Spain.

== Incumbents ==
- Monarch: Philip V

== Events ==
- August 1–3 - Capture of Gibraltar
- August 24 - Battle of Málaga (1704)
- September - beginning of Twelfth Siege of Gibraltar
