= 1705 in Spain =

- Decades: 1680s; 1690s; 1700s; 1710s; 1720s
- See also: History of Spain; Timeline of Spanish history; List of years in Spain

Events in the year 1705 in Spain.

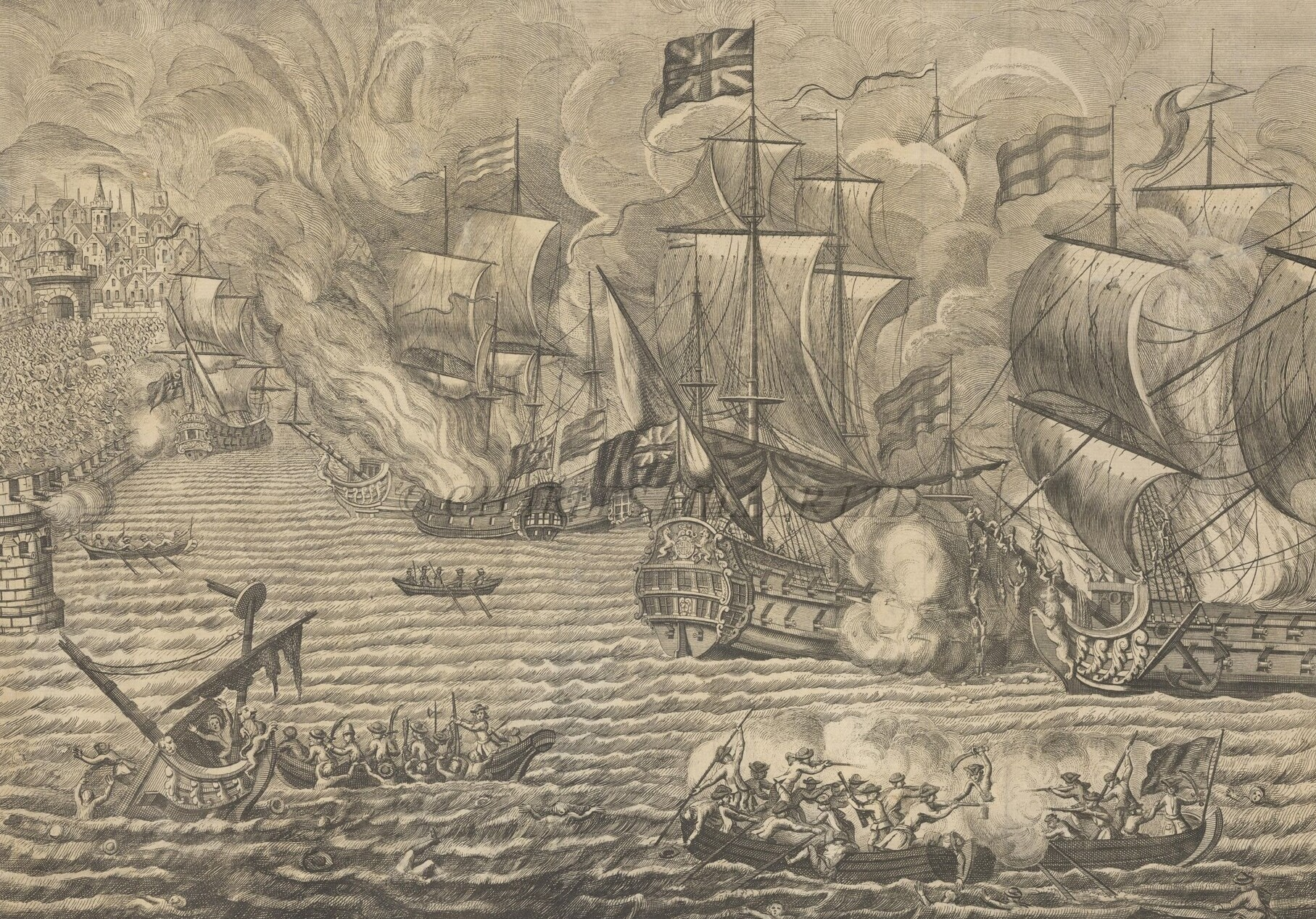
Engraving of the siege of Barcelona

== Incumbents ==
- Monarch: Philip V

== Events ==
- March 21 - Battle of Cabrita Point
- September 13–17 - Battle of Montjuïc
- September 14 – October 19 - Siege of Barcelona
