= 1702 in Spain =

- Decades: 1680s; 1690s; 1700s; 1710s; 1720s
- See also: History of Spain; Timeline of Spanish history; List of years in Spain

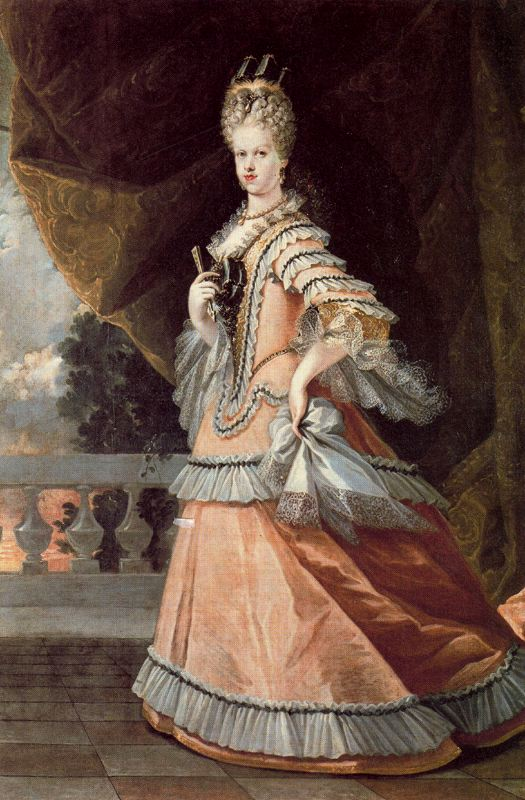
María Luisa Gabriela de Saboya. 1708. Óleo sobre lienzo. 208 x 142 cm. Colección del Marqués de Santillana. Palacio del Infantado. Guadalajara

Events in the year 1702 in Spain.

== Incumbents ==
- Monarch: Philip V

== Events ==
- August 23-late September - Battle of Cádiz (1702)
- October 23 - Battle of Vigo Bay

== Births ==
- April 20 - Zenón de Somodevilla, 1st Marqués de la Ensenada, Secretary of State 1748-1754 (b. 1781)
