= Swords (Parliament of Ireland constituency) =

Pre-1801 Irish constituency

- Former borough constituency for the Irish House of Commons
- County: County Dublin
- Borough: Swords

–1801
- Replaced by: Disfranchised

Swords was a borough constituency represented in the Irish House of Commons until its abolition in 1801. Elections for the borough were considered to "afford scenes of the greatest corruption". This was because the borough was not in the control of a single patron. The borough was disfranchised by the Acts of Union 1800, with effect from 1 January 1801. Where in other disfranchised boroughs the former patron was given compensation of £15,000, in the case of Swords, it was vested "for such uses or purposes as shall appear to them to tend most to the advantage and improvement of the condition of the inhabitants of the said borough".

== Members of Parliament ==
- 1585 Walter Fitzsimons and Thomas Taylor
- 1613–1615 William Blakeney and John Fitzsimons (died and replaced by Richard Carwell)
- 1634–1635 Richard Barnewell and Lucas Netterville (expelled 1634 and replaced by Sir William Anderson)
- 1639–1642 John Taylor and George Blakeney (both expelled 1642)
- 1642 Charles Forster and Christopher Huetson
- 1661–1666 John Povey and Sir William Tichborne

=== 1689–1801 ===
Election	First member	Party	Second member	Party
1689	Francis Barnwall		Robert Russell	
1692	Richard Forster		John Reading	
1695	Thomas Ashe		John Reading	
1703	Robert Molesworth	Whig	James Peppard	
1713	Robert Molesworth	Whig	Plunket Plunket	
1715	Richard Molesworth (Note: from 1716 Hon. Richard Molesworth)		Plunket Plunket	
1727	Hon. Bysse Molesworth		Edward Bolton	
1759	Hon. Bysse Molesworth		Thomas Cobbe	
1761	Hamilton Gorges		Thomas Cobbe	
1768	John Hatch		John Damer	
1776	Thomas Cobbe		Charles King	
1783	Charles Cobbe		John Hatch	
1790	John Claudius Beresford		Eyre Massey	
January 1798	Francis Synge		Charles Cobbe	
1798	Francis Synge		Marcus Beresford	
1801	Constituency disfranchised			

== Sources ==
- Leigh Rayment's historical List of Members of the Irish House of Commons. Cites: Johnston-Liik, Edith Mary (2002). The History of the Irish Parliament 1692-1800 (6 volumes). Ulster Historical Foundation.
