= Northington =

Village and parish in Hampshire, England

Coordinates: 51.133145°N 1.18856°W

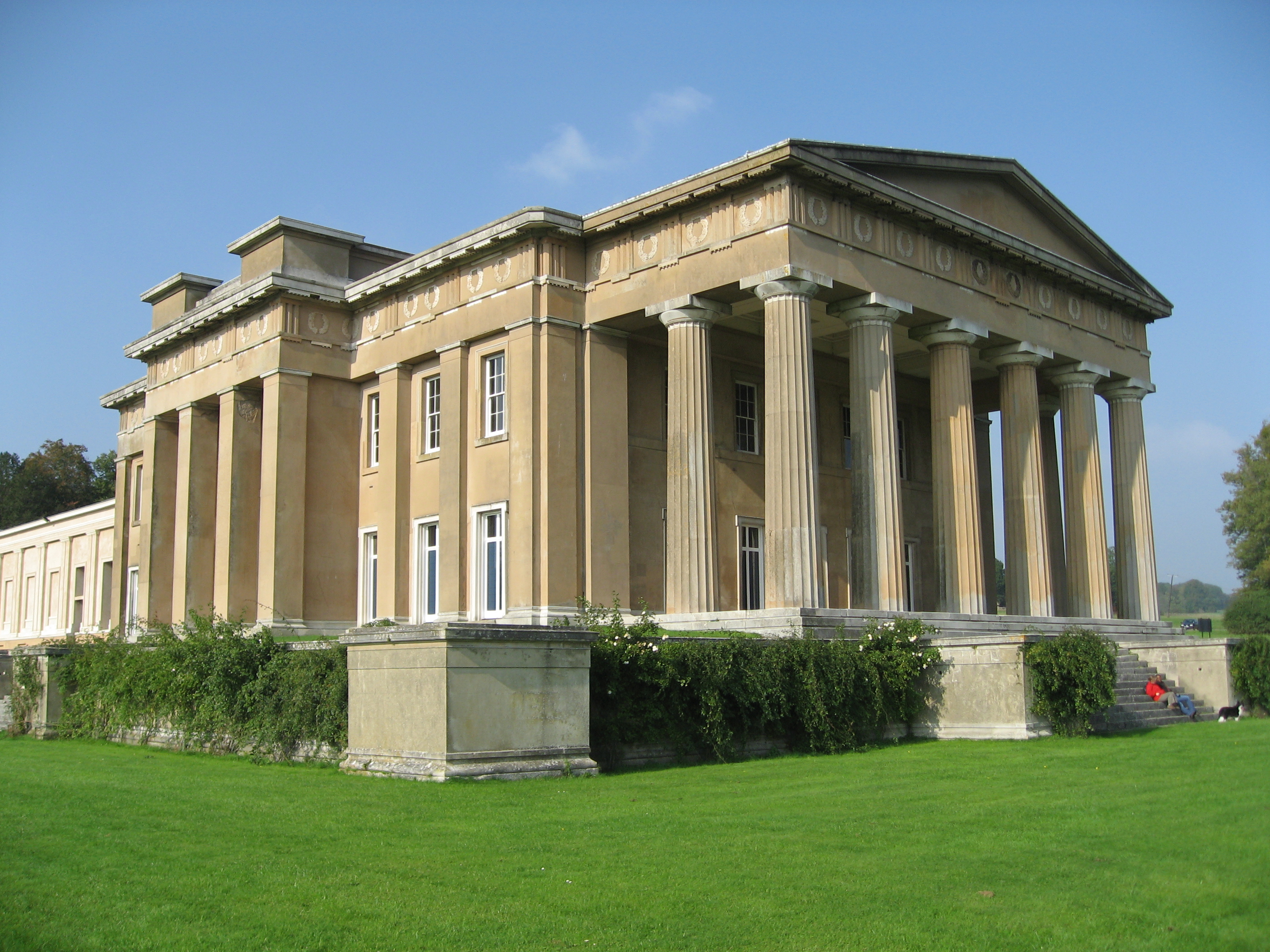
- The Grange at Northington

- Location within Hampshire
- Population: 61 (2001 Census ) 221 (2011 Census including Swarraton)
- OS grid reference: SU5687337410
- District: City of Winchester
- Shire county: Hampshire
- Region: South East
- Country: England
- Sovereign state: United Kingdom
- Post town: ALRESFORD
- Postcode district: SO24
- Dialling code: 01962
- Police: Hampshire and Isle of Wight
- Fire: Hampshire and Isle of Wight
- Ambulance: South Central
- UK Parliament: Winchester

Northington is a village and civil parish in the City of Winchester district of Hampshire, England. It lies half a mile from the neighbouring village Swarraton, across the Candover stream. Its nearest railway station is at New Alresford, on the Mid-Hants railway line.

== History ==
"Six hides at Northington" within the Micheldever Hundred were recorded in Edward the Elder's New Minster charter. Northington joined Swarraton parish in 1849.

== See also ==
- The Grange, Northington
