= Tesco Donabate Distribution Centre =

Retail distribution centre in Donabate, County Dublin, Ireland

- Ionad Dáilte Tesco Dhomhnach Bat
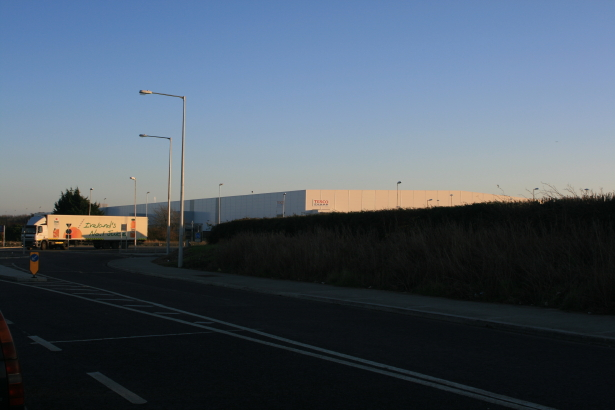

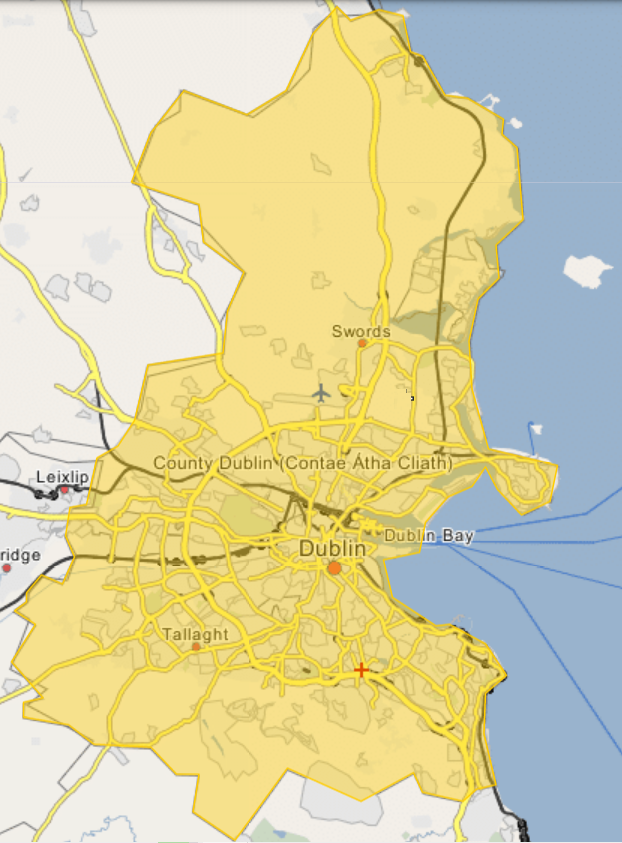
- Location within County Dublin Location within Ireland

General information
- Status: Topped-out
- Type: Distribution centre
- Location: Turvey Avenue, Lanestown, Donabate, Ireland
- Coordinates: 53.486597°N 6.185162°W
- Elevation: 8 metres (26 ft)
- Current tenants: Tesco Ireland
- Topped-out: 2007
- Owner: KTB Investments & Securities and KTB Asset Management

Technical details
- Material: steel
- Floor area: 77,385 square metres (832,965 sq ft; 19 acres)

Website
- www.tesco.ie

Tesco Donabate Distribution Centre is a national retail distribution centre located in Donabate, Fingal, Ireland. Built for and used by Tesco Ireland for distribution of a wide range of goods, as of 2022 it is the 12th-largest building by volume in the world, with a volume of 1,550,000 cubic metres (55,000,000 cu ft); for comparison, this is 42% of the volume of NASA's Vehicle Assembly Building.

== History ==
The distribution centre was developed by Tesco in 2007 at a cost of €60 million and immediately sold for €120 million in a sale and leaseback deal to a consortium assembled by KPMG. It is located in the local government area of Fingal, in the traditional County Dublin, near the M1 motorway. In 2014 it was sold to a South African property fund for €129 million. In 2019 it was sold to South Korean firm KTB Investments & Securities and KTB Asset Management for €160m.

The area of land on which the building was constructed previously formed part of Newbridge Demesne.

== Use ==
The facility employs over 600 people, and handles up to 1.5 million cases per week. It manages and distributes all ambient grocery (packaged and processed) and some non-food products for Tesco Ireland's network of 149 stores. It is laid out in 87 aisles of 31 bays, each 12.3 metres (40 ft) tall, with a storage capacity of 76,000 pallets.

Staff wear arm-mounted terminals (AMTs) to monitor productivity, which attracted media criticism in 2013.

== See also ==
- List of largest buildings by usable volume
