= Anne Cobbe =

British mathematician

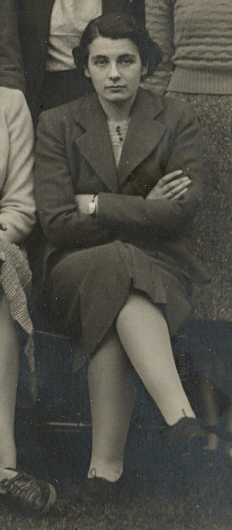
- Anne Philippa Cobbe, Matriculation photograph 1939, Somerville College, Oxford
- Born: 7 August 1920; Sharnbrook
- Died: 15 December 1971 (aged 51); Oxford
- Parents: Sir Alexander Cobbe; Winifred Ada Bowen

Academic background
- Education: Somerville College, Oxford
- Thesis: Modern Algebraic Theories
- Academic advisor: J. H. C. Whitehead

Academic work
- Discipline: Mathematics
- Sub-discipline: Homological algebra
- Institutions: Somerville College, Oxford
- Notable students: Jane Bridge Kister

Anne Philippa Cobbe (7 August 1920 – 15 December 1971) was a mathematician at the University of Oxford. She was an inspirational and supportive pure mathematics tutor at Somerville College which, during her time there, was still a women's college.

== Early life ==
Anne was born in Sharnbrook, Bedfordshire, youngest child of General Alexander Cobbe (member of the Cobbe family) and Winifred Ada Bowen. Her mother was the daughter of Sir Albert Bowen, 1st Baronet, lord of Colworth House, where Anne grew up. She had a sister, Winifred Alice (born 1912) and brother, Alexander William Locke (born 1919). Her father died when she was ten. Her brother, known as Bill, was killed as an RAF pilot in the Battle of Britain in 1940.

== Education and career ==
She attended Downe House School near Newbury, Berkshire. She started reading mathematics in the Sixth form but sat the history scholarship examinations at the University of Oxford in 1938. The result being that she was told that history was not the right subject for her to study. The following year, 1939, she sat the mathematics entrance exam and was awarded an exhibition for a place at Somerville College, Oxford. (Her head teacher Olive Willis had also studied at Somerville College.)

Anne sat her finals in 1942 and then took up a position in operational research for the Royal Navy. After the war she returned to Oxford and was awarded her MA in 1946.

She undertook research at Lady Margaret Hall under the guidance of J. H. C. Whitehead who knew her as a family friend. Her first paper in homological algebra (Some algebraic properties of crossed modules) was published in 1951 and she earned her DPhil for her thesis Modern Algebraic Theories in 1952.

Cobbe became a lecturer at Lady Margaret Hall and published On the cohomology groups of a finite group in 1955. She returned to Somerville the same year, where she was appointed as a fellow and tutor. She enjoyed carefully looking after the gardens of Somerville College and preferred tutoring algebra there – with tea and biscuits, rather than lecturing. In 1957, she published On Q-kernels with operators, a joint paper with Robert Leroy Taylor.

== Later life ==
Cobbe became gravely ill in 1969, a year after interviewing Caroline Series for her admission to Somerville. She gave up her positions as Fellow and Tutor in April 1971, however in the absence of a replacement she continued to offer support and advice until the time of her death in December. She gifted her house in Walton Street through her will to Somerville, on the condition that philosopher Philippa Foot would be granted life tenure. Jane Bridge, whom she had tutored at Somerville, became her successor as mathematics tutor at Somerville after her death.

In 1972, Somerville College established the Anne Cobbe Memorial Fund with contributions from her friends, colleagues and pupils. The purpose of this fund is to provide opportunities for undergraduates reading mathematics, physics or engineering.

== Sources ==
- I. W. Busbridge, Obituary – Anne Philippa Cobbe, Bull. London Math. Soc. 5 (1973), 358–360. https://doi.org/10.1112/blms/5.3.358
