= Bysse Molesworth =

Bysse Molesworth (c.1697 – November 1779) was an Anglo-Irish politician.

Molesworth was a son of Robert Molesworth, 1st Viscount Molesworth and Letitia Coote, daughter of Richard Coote, 1st Baron Coote. He was the Member of Parliament for Swords in the Irish House of Commons between 1727 and 1760. On 7 December 1731 he married Elizabeth Cole, sister of John Cole, 1st Baron Mountflorence and widow of Edward Archdall.

Parliament of Ireland
Preceded by Richard Molesworth; Plunket Plunket	Member of Parliament for Swords; 1727–1760; With: Edward Bolton (1727–1759); Thomas Cobbe (1759–1760)	Succeeded by Hamilton Gorges; Thomas Cobbe
