= 1707 in Spain =

- Decades: 1680s; 1690s; 1700s; 1710s; 1720s
- See also: History of Spain; Timeline of Spanish history; List of years in Spain

Events from the year 1707 in Spain.

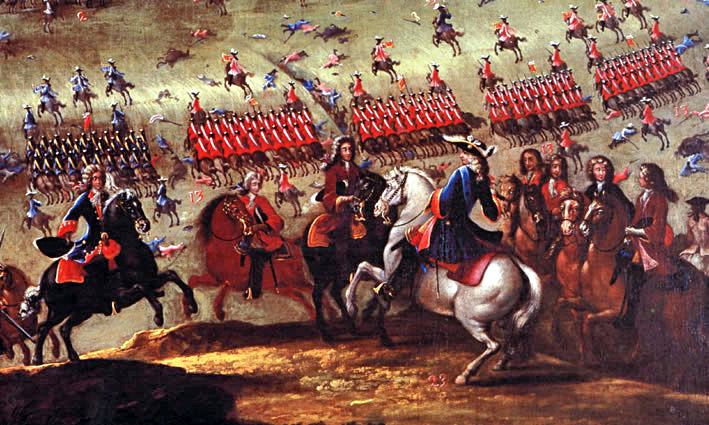
Batalladealmansa

== Incumbents ==
- Monarch: Philip V

== Events ==
- April 25 - Battle of Almansa: the Bourbon army of Spain and France (with Irish mercenaries) under the French-born Englishman James FitzJames, 1st Duke of Berwick, soundly defeats the allied forces of Portugal, England, and the Dutch Republic led by the French-born Huguenot in English service Henri de Massue, Earl of Galway. Following this, Philip V of Spain promulgates the first Nueva Planta decrees, bringing the Kingdoms of Valencia and Aragon under the laws of the Crown of Castile.

== Births ==
- May 21 - Francisco Salzillo, sculptor (d. 1783)
- August 25 - Louis I of Spain (d. 1724)

== See also ==
- War of the Spanish Succession
