= Irish Board of Ordnance =

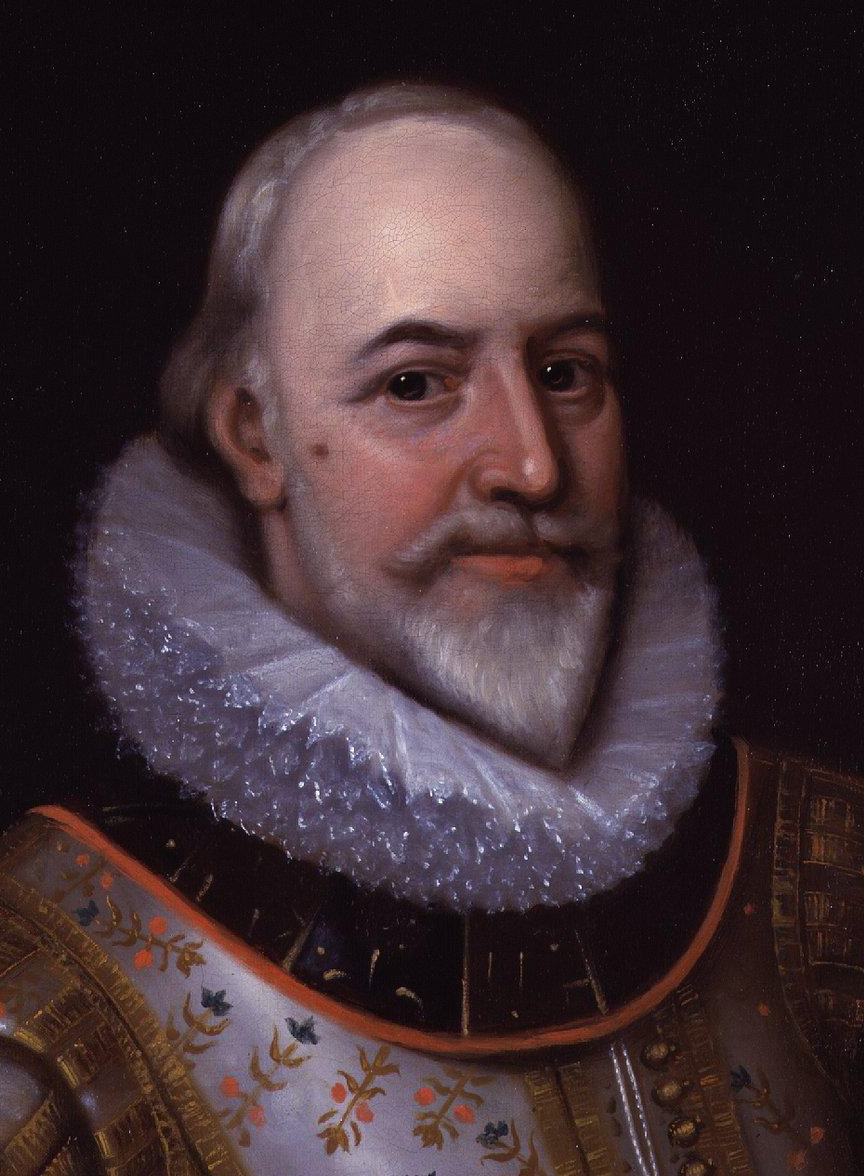
George Carew, 1st Earl of Totnes, the third Master-General of the Ordnance (1588).

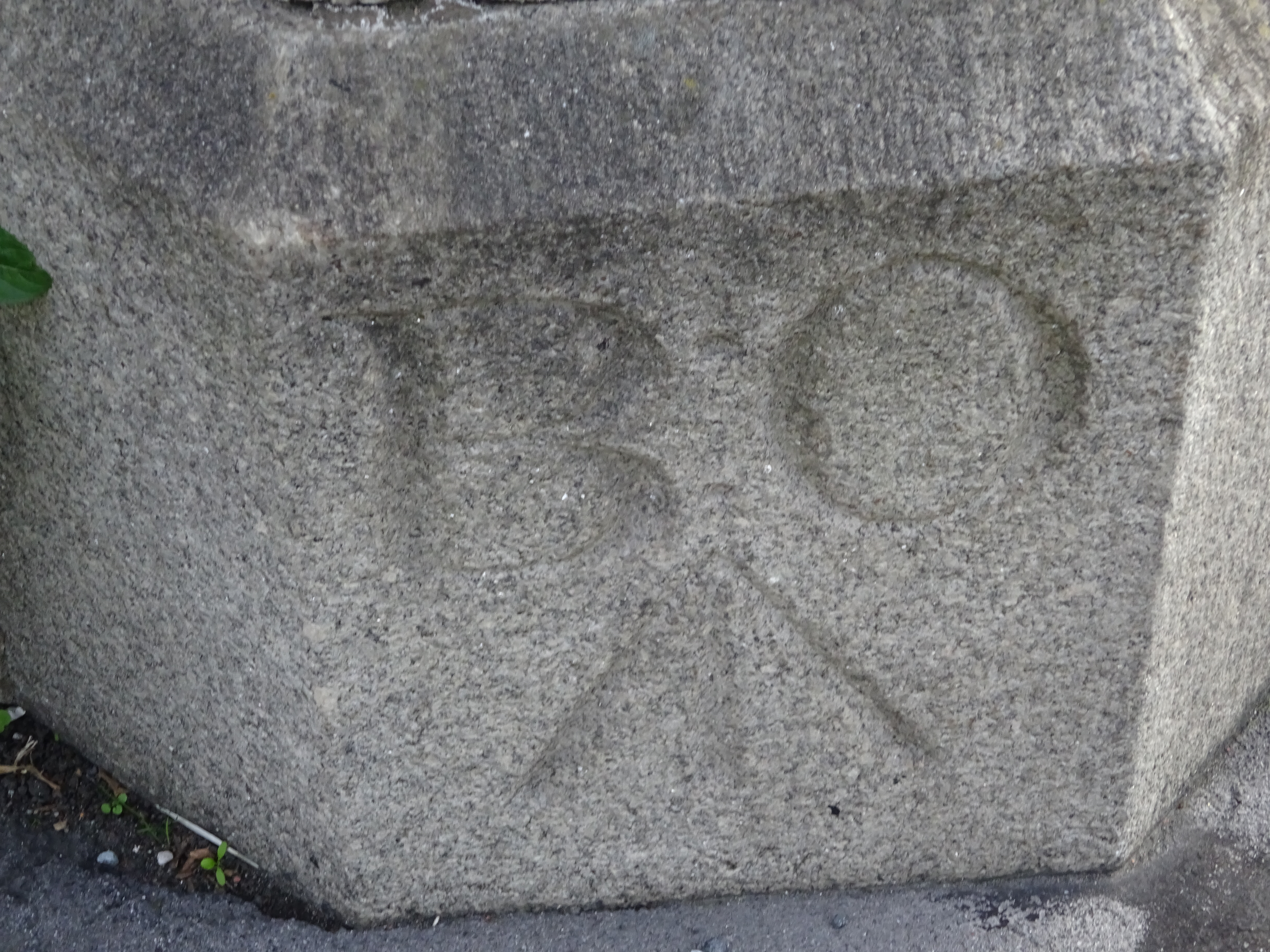
"BO" (Board of Ordnance) mark on a building

The Board of Ordnance in the Kingdom of Ireland (1542–1800) performed the equivalent duties of the British Board of Ordnance: supplying arms and munitions, overseeing the Royal Irish Artillery and the Irish Engineers, and maintaining the fortifications in the island.

Following the Acts of Union 1800, the Board was abolished and the duties taken over by the United Kingdom Board of Ordnance. The various officials of the Board were compensated with pensions for their loss of salary and emoluments.

== Officials of the Board of Ordnance ==
lists are incomplete before 1760

=== Master-General of the Ordnance ===
Salary in 1800: £1,500

- In 1539: Sir John Travers
- 1559–1587: Edward Maria Wingfield
- 1588: Sir George Carew
- 1592: Sir George Bourchier
- 1605: Oliver St John, 1st Viscount Grandison
- 1614: ...
- 1617: Toby Caulfeild, 1st Baron Caulfeild
- 1627: William Caulfeild, 2nd Baron Caulfeild
- 1634: Sir John Borlase (jointly with Sir Thomas Lucas)
- 1648: Roger Boyle, 1st Baron Broghill
- ...
- 1660: Hugh Montgomery, 1st Earl of Mount Alexander
- 1663: Sir Robert Byron
- 1674: Sir Thomas Chicheley (also Master-General of the Ordnance in England)
- 1679: Francis Aungier, 1st Earl of Longford
- 1684: William Stewart, 1st Viscount Mountjoy
- 1692: William Wolseley
- 1698: Hugh Montgomery, 2nd Earl of Mount Alexander
- 1705: Richard Ingoldsby
- 1712: Charles Butler, 1st Earl of Arran
- 1714: William Stewart, 2nd Viscount Mountjoy
- 1727: François de La Rochefoucauld, marquis de Montandre
- 1739: Richard Molesworth, 3rd Viscount Molesworth
- 1758: James FitzGerald, 1st Duke of Leinster
- 1766: Richard Boyle, 2nd Earl of Shannon
- 1770: Charles Moore, 1st Marquess of Drogheda
- 1797: Henry Lawes Luttrell, 2nd Earl of Carhampton
- 1800: Thomas Pakenham

Pakenham was granted compensation of £1,200 per annum after the Union.

=== Lieutenant-General of the Ordnance ===
Salary in 1800: £600

- 1660: Sir Albert Conyngham
- 1687: John Giles
- 1689: William Mansel Barker (Jacobite)
- 1692: Francis Cuffe
- 1695: Chidley Coote
- 1698: Jermyn Wyche
- 1702: Chidley Coote
- 1706: Thomas Burgh
- 1714: Richard Molesworth
- bef 1738: Edward Hill
- ...
- 1759: Bernard Hale
- 1789: Henry Lawes Luttrell, 2nd Earl of Carhampton
- 1797: Thomas Pakenham
- 1800: Marcus Beresford

Beresford was granted compensation of £600 per annum after the Union.

=== Surveyor-General of the Ordnance ===
Salary in 1800: £450

- in 1704: George Houghton
- in 1738: Peter Virasell
- by 1760: Ralph Ward
- 1789: Thomas Pakenham
- 1797: Sir George Shee, 1st Baronet
- 1799: Robert Uniacke

Uniacke was granted compensation of £1,206 13s. per annum after the Union.

=== Clerk of the Ordnance ===
Salary in 1800: £300

- 1691–aft. 1705: Edward Payne
- ...
- bef. 1722–aft. 1738: Hector Pain
- by 1760: Joseph Keene
- 1788: Isaac Corry
- 1789: Richard Magenis
- 1800: Ponsonby Tottenham

Tottenham was granted compensation of £487 2s. 6d. per annum after the Union.

=== Principal Storekeeper ===
Salary in 1800: £200

- 1691: Hugh Rowley
- in 1738: John Favier
- 1748: Thomas Coote
- 1768: John Creighton
- 1775: Thomas Coghlan
- 1788: Thomas Pakenham
- 1789: Thomas Loftus
- 1792: Richard Archdall
- 1797: Charles Handfield
- 1798: Henry Alexander
- 1799: John Hobson

Hobson was granted compensation of £616 13s. 9d. per annum after the Union.

=== Clerk of the Deliveries ===
Salary in 1800: £200

- by 1760: John Gustavus Handcock
- 1767: John Magill
- 1775: Robert Tighe
- 1789: Edward King
- 1789: Robert Wynne

Wynne was granted compensation of £400 per annum after the Union.

=== Treasurer ===
Salary in 1800: £200

- by 1760: John Chaigneau
- 1779: Thomas Burgh

Burgh was granted compensation of £500 per annum after the Union.

=== Secretary to the Master-General ===
Salary in 1800: £182 10s.

- by 1760: Peter Bere
- 1766: Robert Pratt
- 1770: Henry Meredyth
- 1789: John Armit
- 1800: Joseph Atkinson

Atkinson was granted compensation of £520 3s. 6d. per annum after the Union.
