= 1710 in Spain =

- Decades: 1690s; 1700s; 1710s; 1720s; 1730s
- See also: History of Spain; Timeline of Spanish history; List of years in Spain

Events from the year 1710 in Spain.

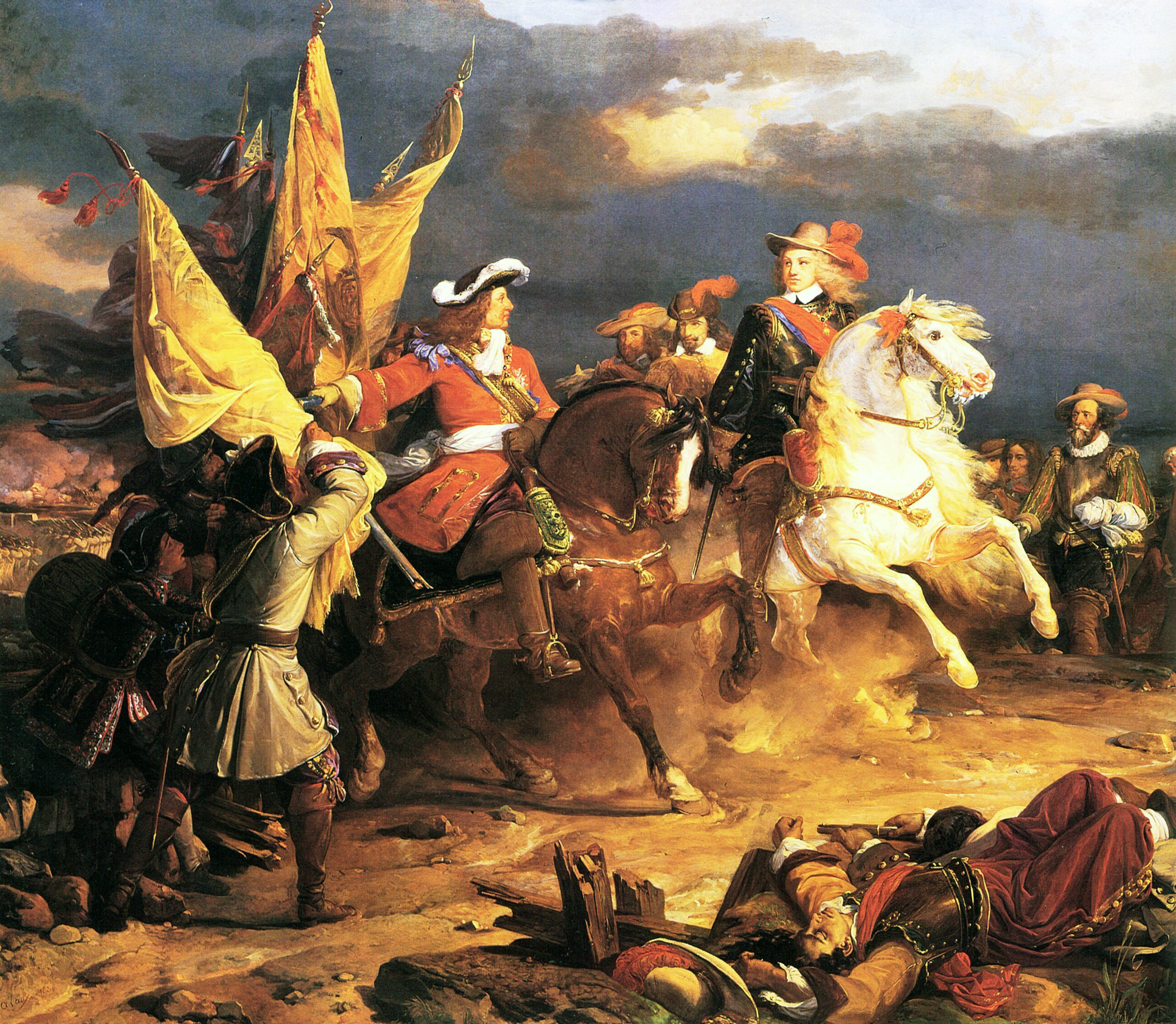
Vendome and Philip V

== Incumbents ==
- Monarch: Philip V
- Secretary of the Universal Bureau: Pedro Fernández del Campo y Salvatierra

== Events ==
- July 27 − Battle of Almenar
- August 20 − Battle of Saragossa
- September 9 − Philip V abandons Madrid
- September 28 − Archduke Charles enters Madrid
- November 9 − Archduke Charles evacuates Madrid
- December 8–9 − Battle of Brihuega
- December 10 − Battle of Villaviciosa

== Births ==
- August 13 − Andrés Fernández Pacheco, 10th Duke of Escalona, grandee and academician (died 1746)

== Deaths ==
- April 24 − Manuel de Oms, 1st Marquis of Castelldosrius, diplomat, man of letters, Viceroy of Peru, 58
- July 8 − Juan García de Salazar, composer, 71
- September 9 − Pedro Manuel Colón de Portugal, 7th Duke of Veragua, 58

== See also ==
- War of the Spanish Succession
