= James Chaloner =

James Chaloner (1602–1660) was an English politician on the Parliamentary side in the English Civil War, and commissioner at the trial of King Charles I.

== Biography ==
Chaloner was born in the parish of St Olave Silver Street, London, the fourth son of the courtier Sir Thomas Chaloner of Guisborough, Yorkshire, and Elizabeth Fleetwood of London, and grandson of Sir Thomas Chaloner, poet and ambassador of Queen Elizabeth. On 10 April 1648 he became one of the Members of Parliament for Aldborough, Yorkshire. He was not excluded from Parliament during Pride's Purge on 20 December 1648 and declared his opposition to the earlier Commons vote accepting Charles I's answers in the Treaty of Newport as grounds for continuing negotiations. In January 1649 he was appointed to sit as a commissioner at the trial of Charles I and sat for a total of six sessions. Unlike his elder brother Thomas Chaloner, he did not sign the royal death warrant.

During the Interregnum he was active in the Commonwealth and enjoyed the patronage of Thomas Fairfax, but under the Protectorate he played no active part in national politics. In 1655 he fell under suspicion of encouraging Fairfax to join the Sealed Knot uprising in Yorkshire, so to remove him from scrutiny Fairfax found him an appointment as Governor of the Isle of Man. He was still the Governor in 1659 when he declared for General George Monck during the second Commonwealth. The London faction of the New Model Army arrested him, but on 7 December that year, as the London faction's star fell and Monck's rose, the Rump ordered Chaloner's release, and in January 1660 confirmed his governorship of the Isle of Man.

He died in July 1660 of a sickness he had contracted during his imprisonment. Before his death he professed his support for the Royalist cause and explained away his part in the Regicide as an attempt on his part "to keep things from falling into a worse condition". He was most likely buried in the Isle of Man. His explanation was disregarded and he was among those whose property was sequestrated by the state under the "forfeitures not extending to Life" terms of the Act of Indemnity and Oblivion.

== Family ==
Chaloner married Ursula, daughter of Sir Philip Fairfax of Steeton; a son and two daughters survived him. His exclusion from the general pardon meant that his family were left unprovided for.

Chaloner's daughter Veriana married Thomas Cobbe, Receiver General of County Southampton and Chaloner's grandson Charles Cobbe became Primate of Ireland.

== Bibliography ==
- Chaloner, James (1653). Cumming, Joseph George (ed.). A Short Treatise of the Isle of Man. Douglas: The Manx Society (published 1844).
