= Hamilton Gorges (1711–1786) =

Anglo-Irish politician

Hamilton Gorges (1711 – 8 April 1786) was an Anglo-Irish politician.

Gorges was the Member of Parliament for Coleraine in the Irish House of Commons between 1757 and 1760, before representing Swords from 1761 to 1768.

He was the father of Richard Gorges-Meredyth.

Parliament of Ireland
Preceded by Henry Carey; Richard Jackson	Member of Parliament for Coleraine; 1757-1760; With: Richard Jackson	Succeeded by Lord La Poer; Richard Jackson
Preceded by Hon. Bysse Molesworth; Thomas Cobbe	Member of Parliament for Swords; 1761-1768; With: Thomas Cobbe	Succeeded by John Hatch; John Damer
