= Richard Molesworth, 3rd Viscount Molesworth =

Anglo-Irish army officer and politician

Field Marshal The Right Honourable The Viscount Molesworth PC (Ire) FRS
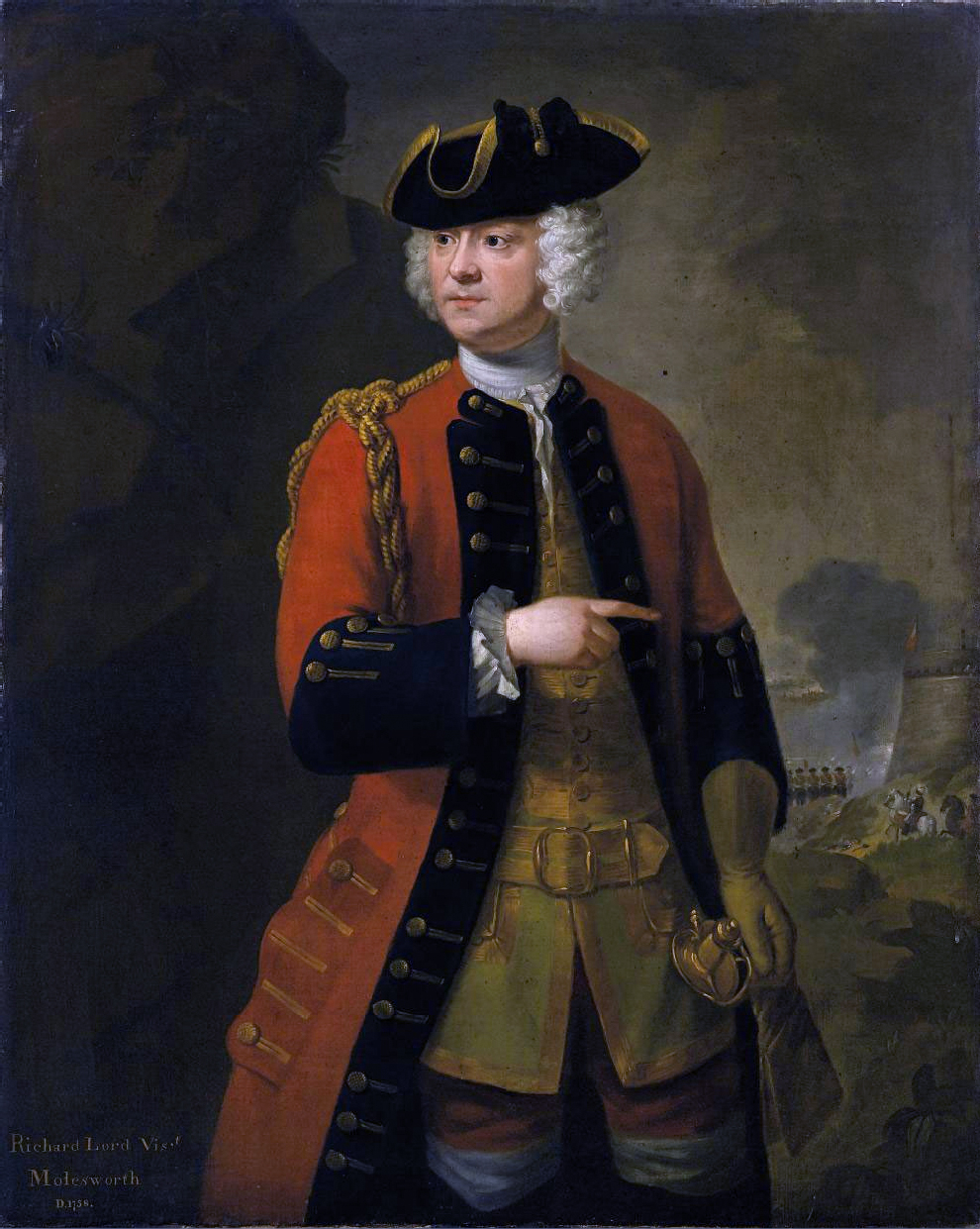
- Portrait of Molesworth
- Born: 1680; Swords, County Dublin
- Died: 12 October 1758 (aged 77–78); London, England
- Burial place: Kensington, London
- Military career
- Allegiance: England; Great Britain
- Branch: English Army; British Army
- Service years: 1702–1758
- Rank: Field marshal
- Commands: Commander-in-Chief, Ireland
- Conflicts: War of the Spanish Succession; Jacobite rising of 1715

Field Marshal Richard Molesworth, 3rd Viscount Molesworth (1680 – 12 October 1758), was an Anglo-Irish army officer and politician. He fought in the Battle of Blenheim before being appointed aide-de-camp to the Duke of Marlborough during the War of the Spanish Succession. During the Battle of Ramillies, Molesworth offered Marlborough his own horse after Marlborough fell from the saddle. Molesworth then recovered his commander's charger and slipped away: by these actions he helped to save Marlborough's life. Molesworth went on to become Lieutenant of the Ordnance in Ireland and was wounded at the Battle of Preston during the Jacobite rising of 1715 before serving as Master-General of the Ordnance in Ireland and then Commander-in-Chief, Ireland.

== Military career ==
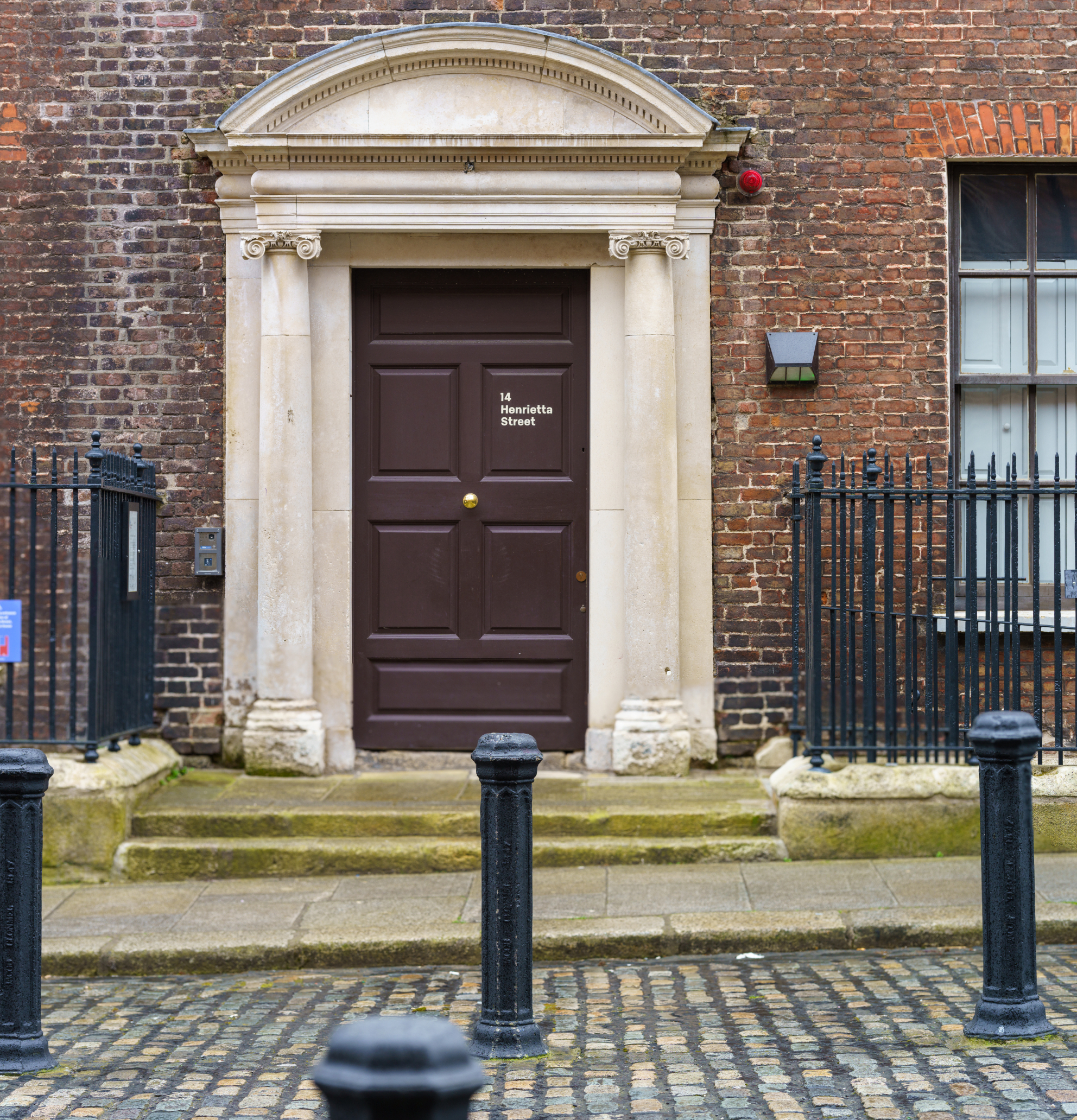
Molesworth's Terrace House – 14 Henrietta Street, Dublin

Born the younger son of Robert Molesworth, 1st Viscount Molesworth, and Letitia Molesworth (née Coote, daughter of Richard Coote, Lord Coloony), Molesworth abandoned his legal studies and was commissioned as an ensign in Orkney's Regiment on 14 April 1702.

Promoted to captain, Molesworth served with his regiment at the Battle of Blenheim in August 1704, before being appointed aide-de-camp to the Duke of Marlborough on 22 May 1706 during the War of the Spanish Succession. During the Battle of Ramillies, which took place the following day, Molesworth offered Marlborough his own horse after Marlborough fell from the saddle. Molesworth then recovered his master's charger and slipped away: by these actions he helped to save his master's life. Promoted to captain in the Coldstream Guards and lieutenant colonel in the Army on 5 May 1707, he was present at the relief of Brussels in 1708 and at the Battle of Malplaquet in September 1709 and was wounded by a mine at the Siege of Mons in October 1709. He commanded an infantry regiment in Catalonia under the Duke of Argyll from July 1710 until he returned to England in late 1712.

Molesworth became Lieutenant of the Ordnance in Ireland in December 1714 and was elected Member of Parliament in the Irish House of Commons for Swords in 1715. He raised a regiment of Dragoons in 1715 and was wounded at the Battle of Preston in November 1715 during the Jacobite rising of that year. After taking part in the competition to develop a marine chronometer, he was elected a Fellow of the Royal Society in March 1722.

Molesworth became colonel of the Inniskilling Regiment of Foot in March 1725 and succeeded his brother as 3rd Viscount Molesworth on 17 February 1726. He went on to be colonel of the Viscount Molesworth's Regiment of Dragoons in May 1732 and, having been promoted to major-general on 18 December 1735 and appointed a Lord Justice for Ireland in December 1736, he became colonel of the 5th Regiment of Dragoons in June 1737. Promoted to the local rank of lieutenant-general in Ireland in 1739, he became Master-General of the Ordnance in Ireland in 1740. Promoted to the substantive rank of lieutenant-general on 1 July 1742 and to general of the horse on 24 March 1746, he became Commander-in-Chief, Ireland in September 1751. At this time he lived at 14 Henrietta Street in Dublin.

Promoted to field marshal on 3 December 1757, Molesworth became Governor of the Royal Hospital Kilmainham; he died in London on 12 October 1758 and was buried in Kensington. He was succeeded in the title by his only son Richard. Lady Molesworth died in a house fire in 1763 with two of her daughters.

== Family ==
Molesworth first married Jane Lucas, of whose family little is known; they had three children, Amelia, Letitia, and Mary, who became the second wife of Robert Rochfort, 1st Earl of Belvedere, and suffered greatly from his ill-treatment of her, which became a subject of public comment.

Following the death of his first wife he married Mary Jenney Ussher, daughter of the Reverend William Ussher, Archdeacon of Clonfert, and his wife Mary Jenney, on 7 February 1744 and had seven children from this union: Richard, 4th Viscount Molesworth, Henrietta (who married Right Hon. John Staples, MP for Antrim), Elizabeth, Charlotte, Melosina, Mary and Louisa (who married firstly William Ponsonby, 1st Baron Ponsonby, and secondly William Fitzwilliam, 4th Earl Fitzwilliam).

Lady Molesworth and her daughters Mary and Melosina perished in a fire at their Upper Brook Street home in 1763.

== Sources ==
- Heathcote, Tony (1999). The British Field Marshals 1736–1997. Pen & Sword Books Ltd. ISBN 0-85052-696-5.

Parliament of Ireland
Preceded by Robert Molesworth; Plunket Plunket	Member of Parliament for Swords; 1715–1727; With: Plunket Plunket	Succeeded by Hon. Bysse Molesworth; Edward Bolton
Military offices
Preceded by Thomas Whetham	Colonel of the Inniskilling Regiment of Foot; 1725–1732	Succeeded by Archibald Hamilton
Preceded by James Crofts	Colonel of Viscount Molesworth's Regiment of Dragoons; 1732–1737	Succeeded by John Cope
Preceded by Owen Wynne	Colonel of the 5th Regiment of Dragoons; 1737–1758	Succeeded by John Mostyn
Preceded by Gervais Parker	Commander-in-Chief, Ireland; 1751–1758	Succeeded by The Earl of Rothes
Peerage of Ireland
Preceded by John Molesworth	Viscount Molesworth; 1726–1758	Succeeded by Richard Molesworth
