= Jane Kister =

British and American mathematical logician (1944–2019)

Jane Elizabeth Kister (born and also published as Jane Bridge, 18 October 1944 – 1 December 2019) was a British and American mathematical logician and mathematics editor who served for many years as an editor of Mathematical Reviews.

== Early life and education ==
Jane Bridge was originally from Weybridge, England, where she was born on 18 October 1944; her father was a lawyer and later a judge. Her family moved to London when she was four, and she studied at St Paul's Girls' School in London. She matriculated at Somerville College, Oxford in 1963, but her studies were interrupted by a diagnosis of lupus; she resumed reading mathematics there in 1964, tutored by Anne Cobbe. She earned a first, won a Junior Mathematical Prize, and continued at Oxford for graduate study.

She was given the Mary Somerville Research Fellowship in 1969, and completed her doctorate (D.Phil.) at Oxford in 1972. Her dissertation, Some Problems in Mathematical Logic: Systems of Ordinal Functions and Ordinal Notations, was supervised by Robin Gandy. She then became a tutorial fellow in mathematics at Somerville College, taking Anne Cobbe's position after Cobbe's retirement, and a member of the Mathematical Institute, University of Oxford, working among others there with Dana Scott.

== Marriage and later life ==
In 1977, mathematician James Kister from the University of Michigan visited Oxford on sabbatical; they married in 1978 and she returned with him to the US, giving up her position at Oxford and in 1992 taking US citizenship. She obtained a visiting professorship at the Massachusetts Institute of Technology, and then in 1979 began working at Mathematical Reviews, where she would remain for the rest of her career. She became associate executive editor in 1984, and executive editor in 1998, the first woman to hold that position. When Mathematical Reviews shifted from being a paper review journal to an online electronic database, MathSciNet, in 1996, Kister was heavily involved in this advance. She also held an adjunct professorship at the University of Michigan.

She retired in 2004, and died of a heart attack on 1 December 2019.

== Books ==
As Jane Bridge, she was the author of the book Beginning Model Theory: The Completeness Theorem and Some Consequences (Clarendon Press, 1977), the first volume in the Oxford Logic Guides book series. She also co-edited the Ω-Bibliography of Mathematical Logic, Volume VI: Proof Theory, Constructive Mathematics (Perspectives in Mathematical Logic, Springer, 1987).
