= Siege of Alcántara (1706) =

1706 battle of the War of the Spanish Succession

- Part of the War of the Spanish Succession
Date	9–14 April 1706
Location	Alcántara, Spain
Result	Anglo-Portuguese victory

Belligerents
England; Portugal	France

Commanders and leaders
(Kingdom of England) Earl of Galway (Portugal) Marquess of Minas	Unknown

Strength
Unknown	Unknown

Casualties and losses
Unknown	10 infantry battalions, 60 guns captured

The siege of Alcántara was a siege between Allied and French forces in 1706, as part of the War of the Spanish Succession. Henri de Massue, Earl of Galway led a force of English and Portuguese troops to attack the French garrison at Alcántara. Part of James FitzJames, 1st Duke of Berwick's army was lost to the French. In total, ten French battalions laid down their arms and surrendered 60 guns to Galway's troops. The Allies proceeded to occupy Madrid two months later.
