= Swarraton =

Village in Hampshire, England

Coordinates: 51.129415°N 1.188709°W

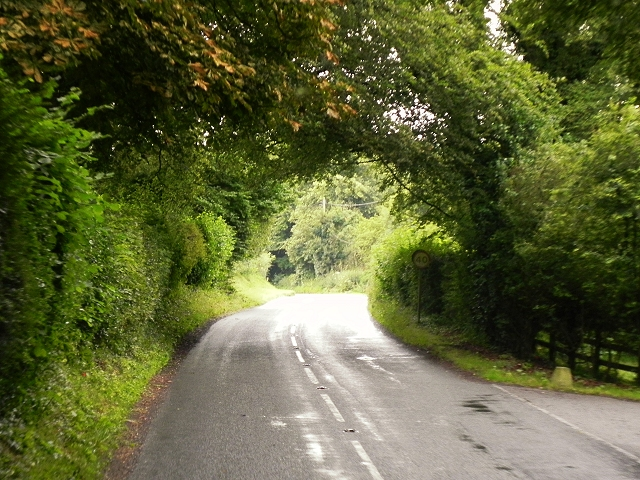

- Location within Hampshire
- Population: 40
- OS grid reference: SU5686736995
- Civil parish: Northington
- District: Winchester
- Shire county: Hampshire
- Region: South East
- Country: England
- Sovereign state: United Kingdom
- Post town: ALRESFORD
- Postcode district: SO24
- Dialling code: 01962
- Police: Hampshire and Isle of Wight
- Fire: Hampshire and Isle of Wight
- Ambulance: South Central
- UK Parliament: Winchester

Swarraton is a small village and former civil parish, now in the parish of Northington, in the City of Winchester district of Hampshire, England. It lies three miles (5 km) from New Alresford covers an acreage of 755 acres (3.06 km^{2}). Its nearest railway station is in New Alresford, on the Mid-Hants section of the London and South Western Railway. In 1931 the parish had a population of 90. On 1 April 1932 the parish was abolished and merged with Northington.
