= Francis Synge =

Anglican priest

Francis Charles Synge was an Anglican priest in the 20th century: an author, educator and senior leader.

Synge was educated at King's School, BrutonSelwyn College, Cambridge and Wells Theological College. He was ordained deacon in 1927, and priest in 1928. After a curacy at St Andrew, Taunton he went out to be Chaplain to the South African Railways Mission in Southern Rhodesia. He was as Rector of Tostock from 1933 to 1935; and then Principal of Queen's College, Birmingham from 1935 to 1939. He was Domestic Chaplain to the Bishop of London from 1939; and a Deputy Priest to the King from 1940. He was Warden at from 1945 to 1954; and Dean of George from 1954 to 1959. He was the Principal of Christ's College, Christchurch from 1959 to 1964; and Archdeacon of Kroonstad from 1965 to 1968.

== Books ==
- St. Paul's Epistle to the Ephesians: A theological commentary (1941)
- Introduction to and commentary on Philippians and Colossians (1951)
- Hebrews and the Scriptures (1956)
