= Newbridge Demesne =

Estate turned park, with historic buildings and show farm

Newbridge House
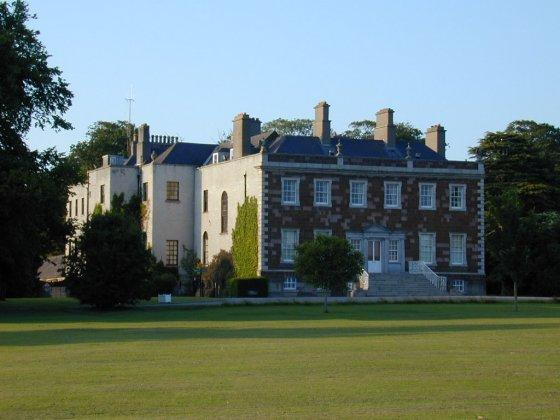
- Facade and lawn of Newbridge House
- Interactive map of the Newbridge House area

General information
- Type: House
- Architectural style: Georgian
- Location: Donabate, North County Dublin, Donabate, Ireland
- Coordinates: 53.4865°N 6.1678°W
- Elevation: 50 m (160 ft)
- Groundbreaking: 1751
- Estimated completion: 1765

Technical details
- Material: limestone and granite dressings
- Floor count: 3 over basement

Design and construction
- Architects: Designed by James Gibbs and executed by George Semple
- Developer: Charles Cobbe
- Other designers: Richard Williams (plasterwork - 1764)

Newbridge Demesne is an early 18th-century Georgian estate and mansion situated in north County Dublin, Ireland. It was built from around 1751 by Charles Cobbe, Archbishop of Dublin, and remained the property of his Cobbe descendants until 1985. It was then acquired by Dublin County Council, in an arrangement, under which Newbridge House would remain the family home.

Set within 400 acres of partially wooded parkland, Newbridge House is one of the finest surviving examples of Georgian architecture. The demesne now forms one of Fingal's regional parks, and contains historic buildings including the main house, a show farm and a cafe and shop.

== Background ==
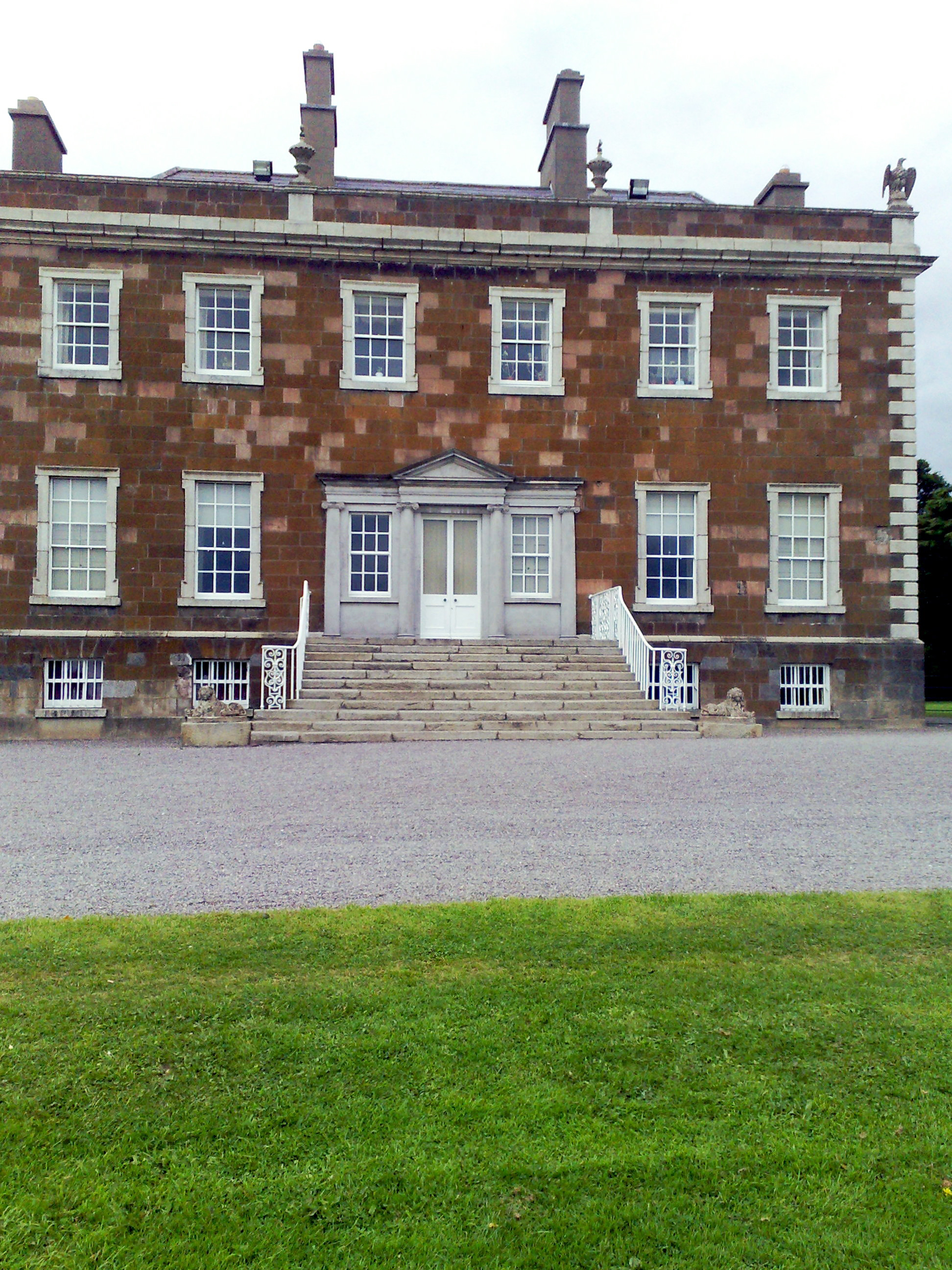
Newbridge House main entrance

On 19 June 1736, Charles Cobbe, then Bishop of Kildare, paid £5,526.5.6 for the townlands of Donabate, Lainstown, Haggardstown and Newbridge, containing 490 acres. However, Bishop Cobbe had a prior interest in these lands, having come to the financial assistance of the Weyms family (port owners) some years earlier. When they had difficulty in repaying a mortgage taken out on the lands. On 21 July 1742 Bishop Cobbe made his second purchase of lands in the parish. These consisted of the townlands of Kilcreagh, Corballis and Baltra, containing in all 510 acres. The purchase price was £6,425.00. As with the first purchase, the Cobbe interest came into being through the owner, Maurice Keating, having difficulty repaying a mortgage. The final purchase of land by the Cobbe family was made in 1811, when Charles purchased the fields north of Newbridge Demesne and bordering Turvey Avenue.

The Archbishop was succeeded by his son, Thomas, who in 1751 married Lady Elizabeth Beresford, daughter of the Earl of Tyrone. She brought a dowry with her, thus enabling major improvements to be made to the house. In the Red Drawing Room, added by them, they lavishly entertained and hung many superb pictures purchased on their behalf by the incumbent of Donabate Church, the Rev. Matthew Pilkington, who was well qualified to do the buying, as it was he who composed the first major English Dictionary of Painters.

Their eldest son, Charles Cobbe, died in 1798, when their eldest grandson, another Charles, became heir apparent. He joined the army, served in India, and returned to Bath in 1805. Four years later he married Frances Conway and immediately came to live at Newbridge, where he carried out much refurbishing with the aid of his wife's money. During the family's absence in Bath, the Estate had become run down. Charles's considerable energies were used to build it up again. He threw down the "wretched mud cabins" occupied by his tenants and built new houses on his estates which were paid for by the sale of some of the family's most prized paintings, such as the Gastor Poussin and a Hobbema. Charles Cobbe died in 1857 and was succeeded by his son, another Charles. He, in turn, died in 1886, leaving no male issue, his estate passing to his wife for her lifetime. Before her death she persuaded Thomas Maberley Cobbe, a grandnephew of her late husband, to return to Newbridge from America to take over the estate. He died young in 1914, leaving two infant sons, Thomas and Francis, of whom the latter died in 1949. Thomas did not marry, and on his death in 1985 he was succeeded by Francis's family, Hugh, Alec, and Mary.

The property was then acquired by the County Council in 1985, but the Cobbe family continued to reside at Newbridge House from time to time, due to a special arrangement with the County Council.

=== Lanestown Castle ===
One of the earliest and largest structures still standing in the Donabate locality is Lanestown castle, a late medieval castellated tower house located on the grounds of Newbridge House. It was originally the largest of four tower houses in the immediate area north of the Broad Meadow estuary along with Portrane Castle (Stella's Tower), Turvey House (now demolished) and Donabate (attached St. Patrick's Church of Ireland Church). The tower was probably part of the £10 Castle scheme initiated in 1429 by King Henry VI in which a landowner would be funded £10 if he built a defensive tower to aid in protecting the Pale.

== House, estate and furnishings ==
Newbridge House was built by Archbishop Cobbe between 1747 and 1752 to the design of architect James Gibbs. Newbridge still contains most of its original furniture. The interiors include the Red Drawing Room, the Museum of Curiosities and ornate plasterwork found throughout the house. The house now offers tours of both the house and farm for money, alongside public events throughout the year.

The estate still maintains a small farm, including a square cobbled courtyard adjoining the house that was designed by Robert Mack, and built about 1790 after the completion of the main house.

Newbridge Demesne opened as a County Dublin Regional Park in 1986.

Part of the land which once made up the estate now contains Tesco Donabate Distribution Centre, the 11th largest building by floor area in the world.

=== Shakespeare portrait ===
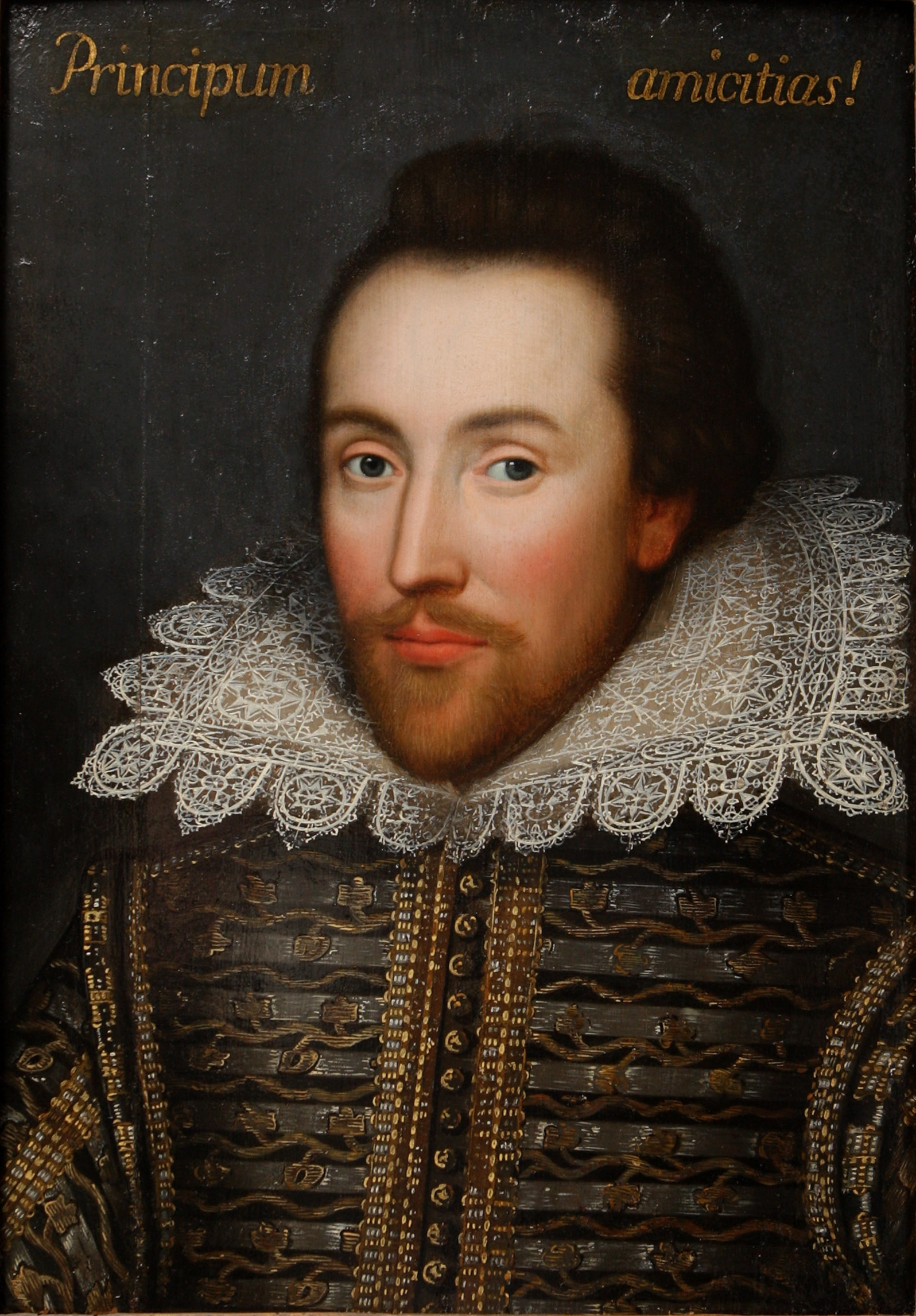
The Cobbe Portrait of William Shakespeare

The Cobbe Portrait is an unattributed panel painting of William Shakespeare painted from memory, believed by some to be the only surviving painting of Shakespeare. Support for this theory is drawn from the inheritance of the portrait by the Cobbe family from Shakespeare's patron, Henry Wriothesley, 3rd Earl of Southampton, and its resemblance to the Janssen portrait, a long-standing candidate to be a portrait of Shakespeare. Scientific examination has dated the panel and paints used to Shakespeare's lifetime, but the claim that it is of Shakespeare has been regarded with scepticism.

== See also ==
- List of townlands of County Dublin
- Cobbe family
- Turvey House, County Dublin

== Bibliography ==
- Murdoch, Tessa (ed.) (2022). Great Irish Households: Inventories from the Long Eighteenth Century. Cambridge: John Adamson, pp. 305–23 ISBN 978-1-898565-17-8 OCLC 1233305993
