= Charles Cobbe =

Irish bishop (1686–1765)

The Right Reverend and Right Honourable Charles Cobbe PC (Ire), D.D.
- Archbishop of Dublin; Bishop of Glendalough; Primate of Ireland
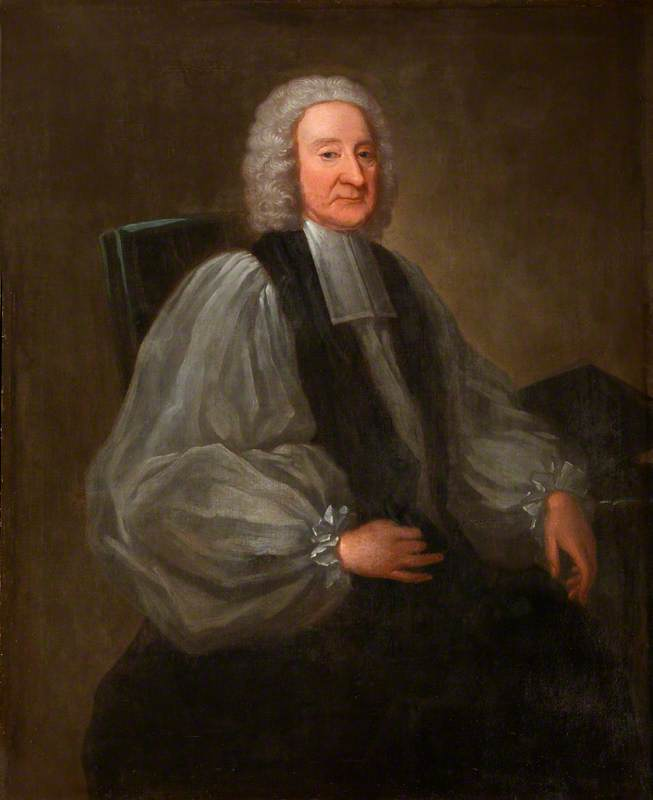
- Archdiocese: Dublin
- Appointed: 4 March 1743
- In office: 1743–1765
- Predecessor: John Hoadly
- Successor: William Carmichael
- Previous posts: Bishop of Killala and Achonry (1720-1727); Bishop of Dromore (1727-1731); Bishop of Kildare (1731-1743)

Orders
- Consecration: 14 August 1720 by John Evans

Personal details
- Born: 1687 Donabate, Ireland
- Died: 14 April 1765 St. Sepulchre's, Dublin
- Buried: Donabate
- Denomination: Anglican
- Parents: Thomas Cobbe & Veriana Chaloner
- Spouse: Dorothea Levinge
- Education: Winchester College; Trinity College, Oxford

Charles Cobbe (1686 in Swarraton – 1765) was Archbishop of Dublin from 1743 to 1765, and as such was Primate of Ireland.

== Early life ==
Cobbe was the second son of Thomas Cobbe, of Swarraton, Winchester, Receiver General for County Southampton, by his marriage to Veriana Chaloner. He was educated at Winchester College and Trinity College, Oxford.

Charles Cobbe's maternal grandfather James Chaloner was Governor of the Isle of Man from 1658 to 1660. Following the Restoration of the monarchy, Chaloner committed suicide by taking poison at the approach of English soldiers, knowing they had orders to arrest him and to secure his castle for the king. In some sources, Cobbe's father Thomas Cobbe is also given the title governor of the Isle of Man. Cobbe's older brother was Colonel Richard Chaloner Cobbe.

== Career ==
Cobbe arrived in Ireland in August 1717 as chaplain to his cousin Charles Paulet, 2nd Duke of Bolton, Lord Lieutenant of Ireland. By January the following year he was appointed Dean of Ardagh. In 1720, he was appointed to the Bishopric of Killala. By 1726 he was translated to the See of Dromore, and in 1731 he was promoted to the Bishopric of Kildare and the Deanery of Christ Church. He held this position until 10 March 1743 when he was enthroned as Archbishop of Dublin, bringing him to fourth in precedence in the government of Ireland.

== Personal life ==
In 1730, Cobbe married Dorothea (née Levinge), Lady Rawdon, a daughter of Sir Richard Levinge, 1st Baronet and the former Mary Corbin. His wife was the widow of Sir John Rawdon, of Moira, County Down, and had two sons by Rawdon: John, later Earl of Moira; and Arthur Rawdon. From her marriage to Cobbe, Dorothea bore two more sons before her death while giving birth to their second son:

- Charles Cobbe (1731–1750), who died unmarried.
- Thomas Cobbe (1733–1814), who married Lady Eliza Beresford, a younger daughter of Marcus Beresford, 1st Earl of Tyrone, and Lady Catherine Power, suo jure Baroness La Poer, in 1751. Among her siblings were George Beresford, 1st Marquess of Waterford, John Beresford, MP, and William Beresford, 1st Baron Decies.

Cobbe was the founder of the prominent Cobbe family in Ireland and built the ancestral home of Newbridge outside Dublin between 1747 and 1752. The collection at Newbridge has been documented in The Cobbe Cabinet of Curiosities: An Anglo-Irish Country House Museum.

He died at St. Sepulchre's Palace, Dublin, on 14 April 1765, and was buried at Donabate.

Church of Ireland titles
| Preceded by John Hoadly | Archbishop of Dublin; 1743–1765 | Succeeded by William Carmichael |
| Preceded by Welbore Ellis | Bishop of Kildare; 1732–1743 | Succeeded by George Stone |
| Preceded by Ralph Lambert | Bishop of Dromore; 1727–1732 | Succeeded by Henry Maule |
| Preceded by Henry Dowes | Bishop of Killala and Achonry; 1720–1727 | Succeeded by Robert Howard |
