= Eyre Massey, 1st Baron Clarina =

British Army officer

The Lord Clarina
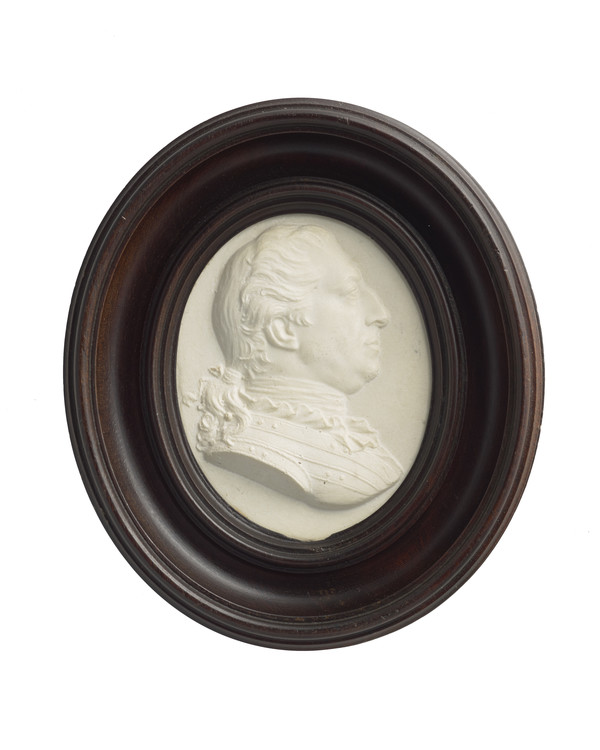
- 1894 marble portrait of Massey after a cameo medallion by James Tassie
- Born: 24 May 1719; Duntrileague, County Limerick
- Died: 17 May 1804 (aged 84)
- Military career
- Allegiance: Great Britain; United Kingdom
- Branch: British Army
- Service years: 1739–1804
- Rank: General
- Commands: 27th (Inniskilling) Regiment of Foot
- Conflicts: French and Indian War; Battle of La Belle-Famille

General Eyre Massey, 1st Baron Clarina (24 May 1719 – 17 May 1804) was a British Army officer who served in the French and Indian War. In 1800, he was made Baron Clarina in the peerage of Ireland.

== Life and career ==
Born on 24 May 1719, he was fifth son of Colonel Hugh Massey of Duntrileague, County Limerick, and his wife Elizabeth, fourth daughter of George Evans, the father of George Evans, 1st Baron Carbery. His eldest brother was Hugh Massy, 1st Baron Massy. In a memoir he states that he 'purchased a pair of colours' in the 27th foot in 1739, and went with the regiment to the West Indies as lieutenant of the grenadiers.

The 27th foot, of which his fellow Limerickman General William Blakeney was colonel, fought at Porto Bello, Panama, with Admiral Vernon, in 1739, and the few survivors returned home in December 1740. Military records show the dates of Massey's commissions in the 27th foot as ensign, 25 January 1741. Massey served with his regiment in Scotland in 1745–1746, and was made captain-lieutenant, and captain in the regiment by the Duke of Cumberland, apparently in 1747, captain 24 May 1751, and major 10 December 1755.

=== French and Indian War ===
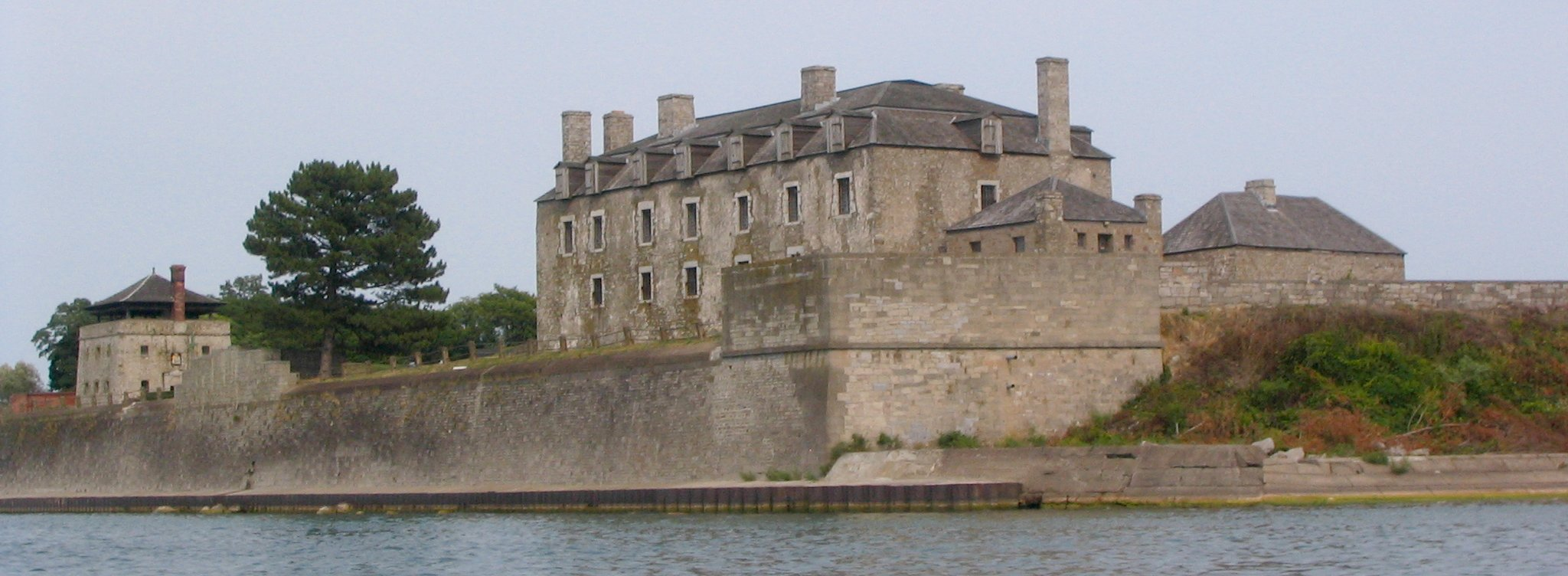
Massey defeated a French relief force at La Belle-Famille which forced the besieged fort of Niagara to capitulate.

In 1757 he went out to North America as a major 46th foot, of which he became lieutenant-colonel in 1758, and the year after commanded the regiment in the expedition to Niagara, succeeding to the command of the king's troops when Brigadier-general John Prideaux was killed.

Massey states in his memoirs that as Sir William Johnson was in command of a large body of Indians, who were lukewarm in the British cause, he waived the chief command in favour of Johnson. Massey commanded in the action at La Belle-Famille, where with five hundred militia, men of the 46th, and four hundred Indians he routed eighteen hundred French regulars and Canadians, together with five hundred Indians, taking all the French officers but one prisoner. This action took place in view of Fort Niagara, which surrendered immediately afterwards, leaving the whole region of the Upper Ohio in possession of the British. Massey was transferred to his old regiment, the 27th Inniskillings, at his own request, and commanded the grenadiers of the army in the advance on Montreal in 1760. He commanded a battalion of grenadiers at the capture of Martinique in 1762, and at the conquest of Havana in 1762. During these campaigns he was wounded several times.

=== Later career ===
After the secession of peace, Massey commanded the 27th in New York and Quebec from 1763 to 1769, and afterwards in Ireland. He was appointed colonel of the regiment on 19 February 1773. Massey was then deployed to Nova Scotia in 1776 as a Major-General, and commanded the troops in Halifax for four years. Later he held command at Cork. A plan of his for the defence of Cork in 1780 is in the British Library (Add MS 33178, f. 240).

For many following years he remained unemployed by the military. From 1790 to 1797 he served as Member of Parliament for Swords in the Parliament of Ireland. However, in some letters to General Sir John Vaughan around 1793–4, Massey relates his disappointments in not obtaining a military command, and his vexations at the appointment by the Marquis of Buckingham, the lord-lieutenant, of 'Popish children' (Master Talbot, aged eight, Master Skerritt, aged nine, and others), to ensigncies in his regiment. Later in 1794 he obtained the Cork command, which he held until his promotion to full general in 1796. The command had difficulties with new regiments, which the government persisted in 'drafting' in defiance of their recruiting engagements. He quelled a mutiny of two thousand of these young troops at Spike Island in 1795.

Massey was raised to the Peerage of Ireland on 27 December 1800, under the title of Baron Clarina of Elm Park, County Limerick. He died a full general, colonel of the 27th Inniskilling foot, Marshal of the Army in Ireland, and governor of Limerick and of the Royal Hospital, Kilmainham, on 17 May 1804, aged 85.

== Marriage and issue ==
Massey married Catherine, sister of Robert Clements, 1st Earl of Leitrim, by whom he had four children. Two of his successors in the title—his second and only surviving son, Nathaniel William, second baron, who died a major-general on the staff in the West Indies in 1810, and his great-grandson, the fourth baron (died 1897), who served in the 95th regiment in the Crimea and the Indian mutiny—rose to general's rank.

== Arms ==
Coat of arms of Eyre Massey, 1st Baron Clarina

Crest
Out of a ducal coronet Or a bull's head Gules armed Sable.
Escutcheon
Argent on a chevron between three fusils Sable a lion passant Or.
Supporters
Two grenadier soldiers in the uniform of the 27th Foot Proper each holding in his exterior hand a sword also Proper.
Motto
Pro Libertate Patriae

Peerage of Ireland
New creation	Baron Clarina; 1800–1804	Succeeded by Nathaniel Massey
Military offices
Preceded by Eyre Coote	Colonel of the 27th Regiment of Foot; 1773–1804	Succeeded by Francis Rawdon-Hastings, 1st Marquess of Hastings
