= Donabate =

Suburban town in County Dublin, Ireland

Donabate Domhnach Bat (Irish)
- Suburban town
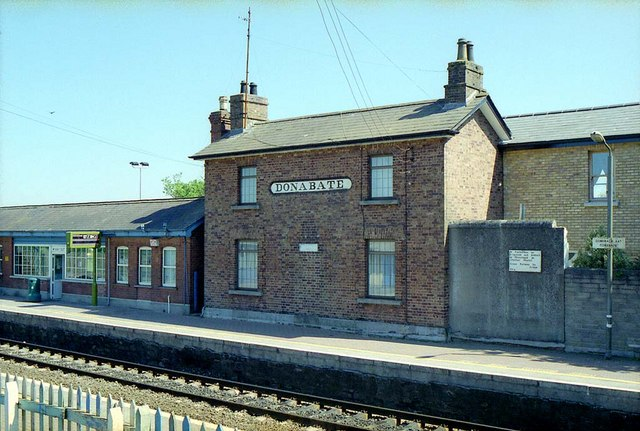
- Donabate railway station

- Location in Ireland
- Coordinates: 53.487°N 6.152°W
- Country: Ireland
- Province: Leinster
- County: County Dublin
- Local government area: Fingal
- Elevation: 8 m (26 ft)

Population (2022)
  - Total: 9,669
- Time zone: UTC±0 (WET)
  - Summer (DST): UTC+1 (IST)
- Eircode routing key: K36
- Telephone area code: +353(0)1
- Irish Grid Reference: O225501

Donabate (Irish: Domhnach Bat) is a suburban coastal town in County Dublin, Ireland, about 21 kilometres (13 miles) north-northeast of Dublin, which it serves. It lies within the local government area of Fingal.

It is on a peninsula on Ireland's east coast, between the Rogerstown Estuary to the north and the Broadmeadow Estuary to the south. Donabate is also a civil parish in the ancient barony of Nethercross.

== Geography ==
The Portrane–Donabate peninsula forms a distinctive hammer-head shape. This is because each of the mouths of both estuaries surrounding the peninsula are partially closed by large sand spits stretching north to south. The northern spit contains Portrane beach which almost touches Rush South Beach but for a narrow channel entering the Rogerstown Estuary. A stretch of low limestone cliffs to the south of Portrane beach leads to Balcarrick or Corballis Beach, which is the east face of the southern spit. To the south, the estuary of the Broadmeadow River is likewise almost completely enclosed. The shelter provided by the spits makes the estuaries important wildlife habitats and both are protected under the international Ramsar Convention.

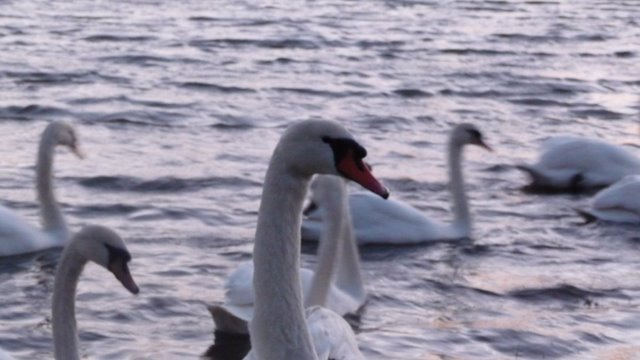
Mute Swans in the Broadmeadow estuary Donabate

== History ==
The 1911 census recorded that the settlement had a population of 734 people, living in 150 dwellings, and Donabate remained a small village for more than a century. In later years, the area's access to the capital city of Dublin has improved with upgraded roads and the re-opening of a former railway station. The census of 1996 recorded that the population was 1,868; by the time of the 2002 census it had doubled to 3,854. The 2022 census recorded a population of 9,669.

Having been defined as an "expanding suburban village", Donabate - in combination with neighbouring Portrane - is now defined by the local authority as a "self-sustaining growth town".

Donabate & Portrane - a history was written and first published in 1988 by Peadar Bates, a Donabate/Portrane historian. Expanded in 2001, the book includes information on the beginnings of Donabate around the 7th century A.D., the building of Lanistown Castle, probably around 1376 when the Bathe family first came into the possession of the lands, the building of Newbridge House between 1698 and 1705 and the subsequent purchase of 1490 acres of land, including the house, by the Cobbe family in 1736.

In July 2022, a tunnel was found by accident in the Corballis area of Donabate, on land subject to a planning application later granted in November 2022, when a farmer turned a stone on his field. The stone covered the entrance of a chamber and a tunnel, possibly dating from the Early Medieval period, 7th century A.D. to about 1100 A.D.

== Representation and community ==
The Donabate–Portrane peninsula is in the local electoral area of Rush–Lusk, which elects five councillors to Fingal County Council. Donabate is in the Dáil constituency of Dublin Fingal East, which elects three TDs to Dáil Éireann.

Donabate Portrane Community and Leisure Centre was opened in 2001. The town also has a Chamber of Commerce, Scout Group (63rd Dublin 14th Port Donabate), two soccer clubs (St Ita's AFC and Portrane Athletic), a GAA club (St Patrick's), Karate and Tae-Kwon Do clubs, a snooker club, a Historical and Folklore Society, and a Tidy Towns Committee.

== Education ==
National schools (primary schools) serving the area include Donabate Portrane Educate Together National School, St Patrick's Girls National School, and St Patrick's Boys National School. Donabate Community College VEC is a local post-primary school (secondary school). Donabate opened its first Gaelscoil primary school, Gaelscoil na Mara, in 2020.

== Religion ==
Donabate is a parish in the Fingal North deanery of the Roman Catholic Archdiocese of Dublin, currently part of a group of parishes along with Portrane and Balheary. It is served by the church of St Patrick.

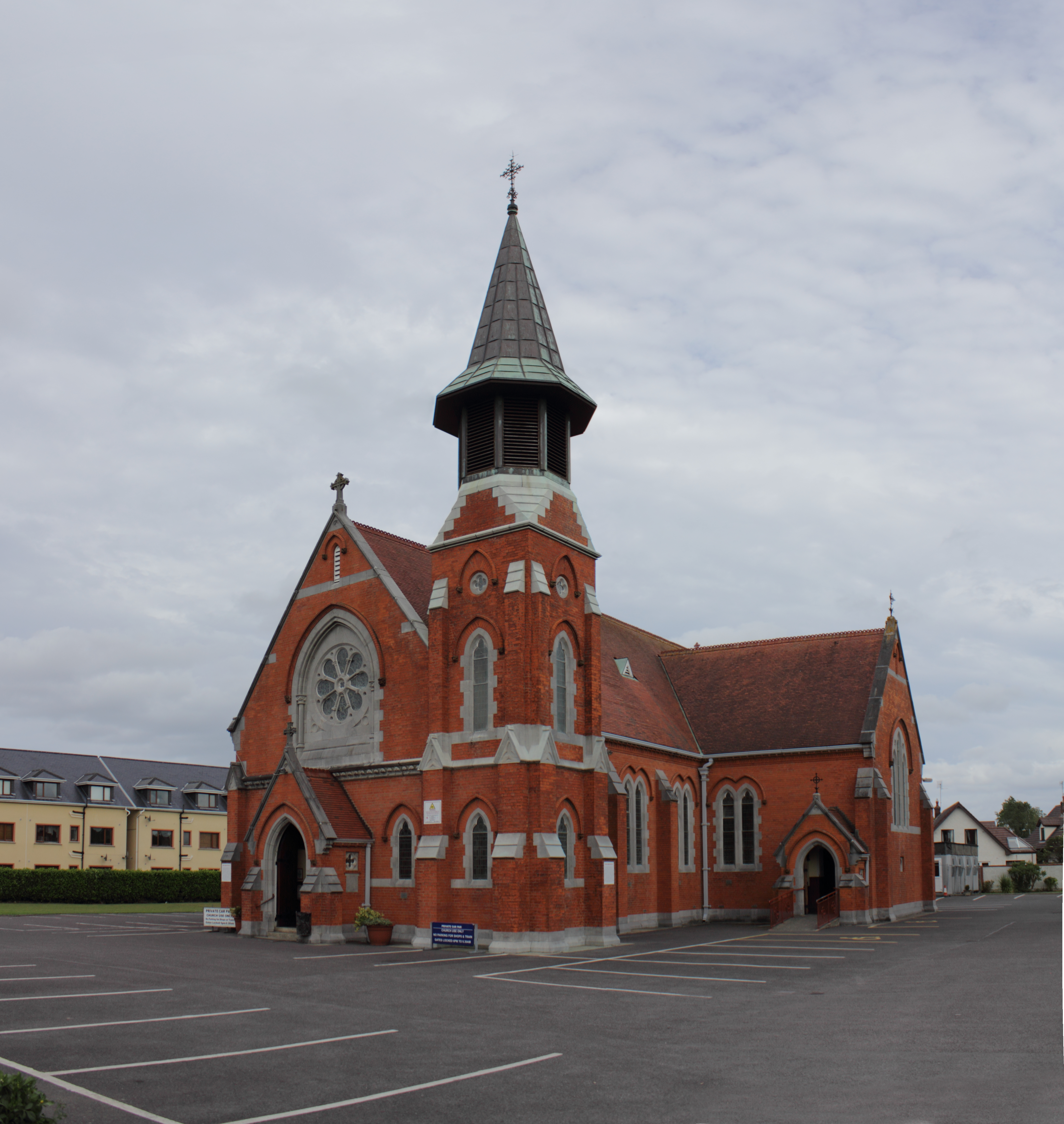
Donabate Roman Catholic Church

Other churches in the area include: Church of Ireland (St Patrick's Church), which since 1968 is part of the Group of parishes which also includes Swords and Kilsallaghan (Donabate having also been merged with St. Catherine's Church, Portrane, since 1835) and Donabate Presbyterian Church, which meets at Donabate Portrane Community Centre.

== Sport ==
=== Golf ===
There are five courses on the peninsula: The Island Golf Club, Beaverstown Golf Club, Balcarrick Golf Club, Donabate Golf Club (a 27-hole course) and Corballis Links Golf Club (a public course). The peninsula was once home to a sixth club, Turvey Golf Club, situated on the former Turvey estate, that has since closed. Several of these courses have views of the estuaries or the open sea, including links courses such as The Island, which is ranked as one of the top 20 courses in Ireland.

=== GAA ===
The local Gaelic Athletic Association (GAA) club, St Patrick's GAA or Cumann Lúthchleas Gael, Naomh Pádraig, dates from 1924. It has a membership of over 300 as of 2009. The club plays at Robbie Farrell Park, Ballymastone in Donabate. Gaelic football and hurling are played at adult level as well as at under-age levels from an expanding nursery section. The club colours are green and black.

=== Football ===
St. Ita's Athletic Football Club (AFC) has been active in Donabate/Portrane from the early 20th century. As of the early 21st century, they play in the Leinster league and field several underage teams. The main pitch is in Ballymastone and they also play in the grounds of the St. Ita's Hospital. The club's colours are green and white.

=== Water sports ===
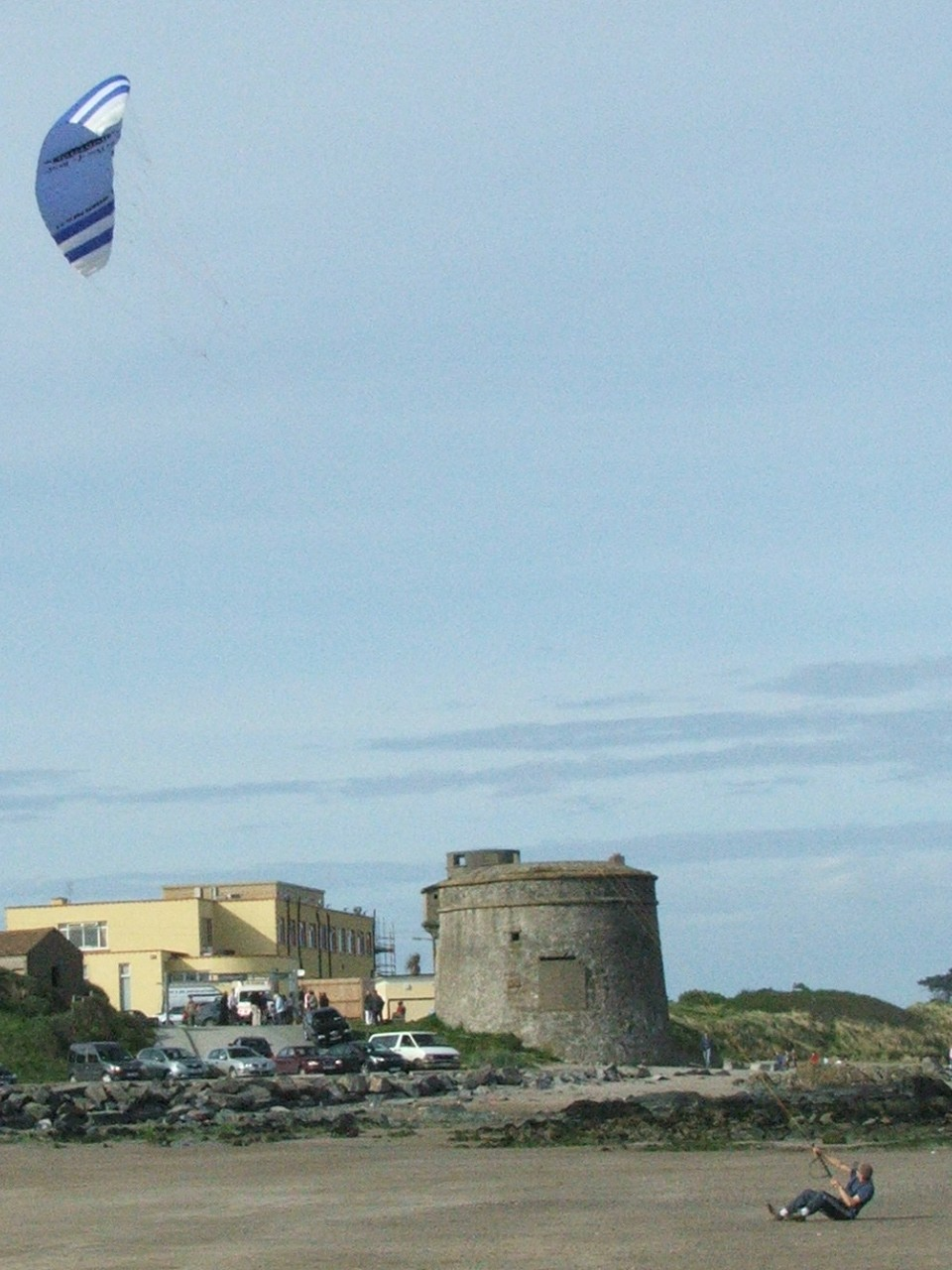
Chasing a kite on Corballis Beach

Kayaking, sailing and wind surfing are undertaken at Balcarrick / Corballis beach and in the Broadmeadow estuary. There are also marinas in nearby Rush and Malahide. The use of jet skis and fast powerboats is restricted by law in the estuaries and beaches and regulated by permit.

Both Balcarrick / Corballis and Portrane beaches are staffed by lifeguards during the summer months. In 2009, Portrane beach was among several Irish beaches to lose its blue flag status due to poor water quality, but subsequently regained blue flag status and from 2011 to 2015. Corballis / Balcarrick beach has an area used by naturists.

=== Hockey ===
Portrane Hockey Club was founded in 1919 and fields hockey teams in the Leinster senior league. The club suffered from the introduction of compulsory synthetic pitches in the 1990s as they were unable to continue using their grass pitch in St. Ita's Hospital. However, the club remained active and an all-weather pitch was reportedly opened in 2011.

=== Other sports ===
In equestrianism, the hunter trials of the Ward Union Hunt are held at Corballis Farm in Corballis Donabate. The area also has a tennis club, Donabate Portrane Tennis Club, near Donabate Golf Club.

The cliffs between Donabate and Portrane are known as a site for bouldering.

== Culture ==
=== Newbridge House and Estate ===
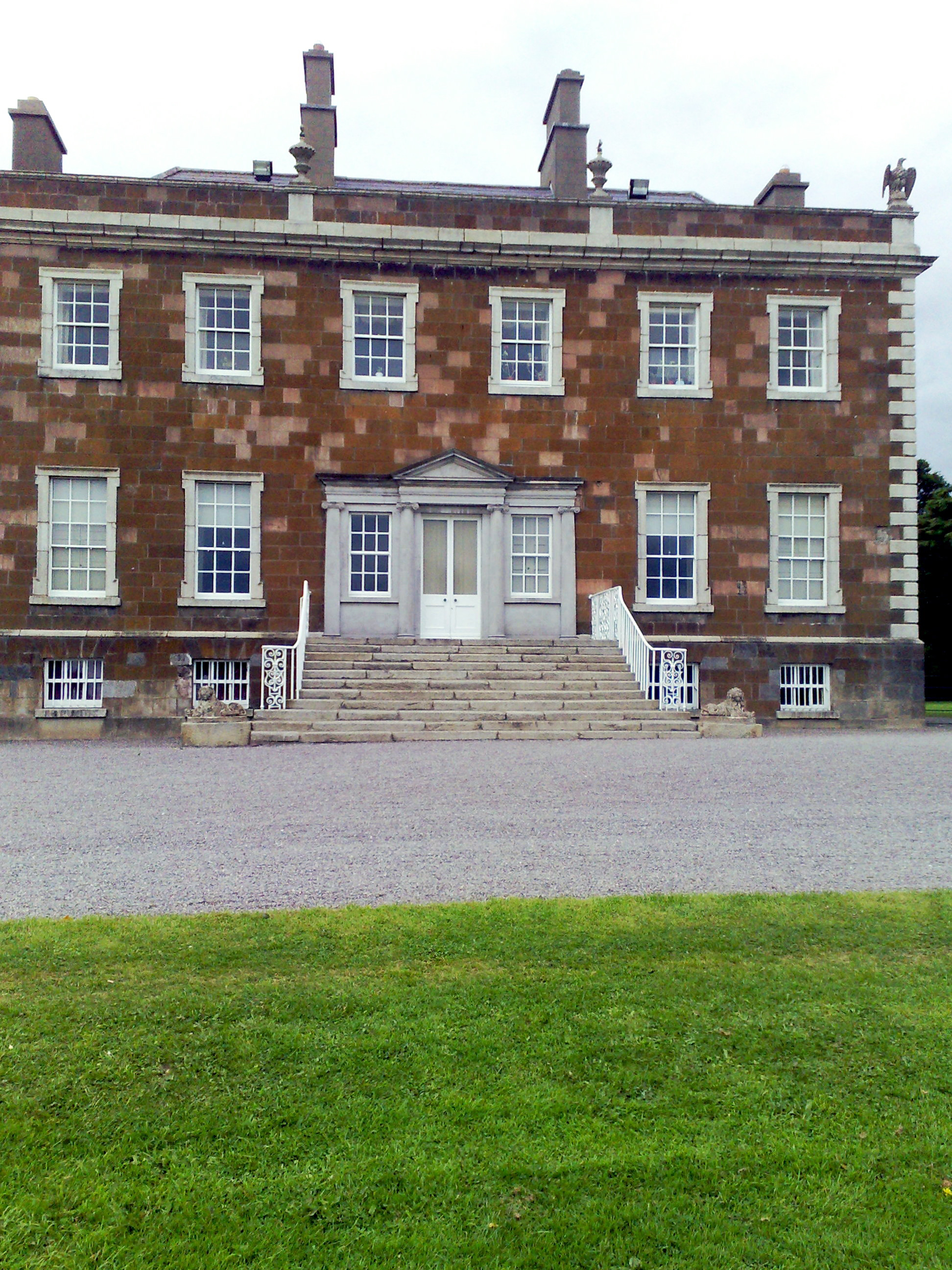
Newbridge House, Donabate

Newbridge House, within Newbridge Estate, just outside the core settlement of Donabate, is a Georgian mansion built for Charles Cobbe, Archbishop of Dublin in 1736. It sits on 370 acres (150 ha) of eighteenth-century landscaped parklands with perimeter woodland belts and fine vistas across lawns and wildflower meadows. The grounds also include a late medieval castellated tower house named Lanestown Castle. The estate was bought by Fingal County Council in a unique arrangement with the Cobbe family in 1985 and is now a public park, playground and model farm, while the family continue to maintain an apartment within the main building on a part-time basis. The park also contains playing pitches used by local sports clubs.

Newbridge House was a location for the 1965 film The Spy Who Came in from the Cold. In 2009 a previously unrecognised rare portrait of William Shakespeare was found to have been hanging in the drawing-room of the house.

The Farm at Newbridge is located to the west and north of Newbridge House and beside the walled garden. Between 1989 and 1990, the County Council Parks Department undertook the renovation, reconstruction and restoration of the courtyard, haggard and adjoining buildings. A number of farm animals and fowl are now housed here, including several rare or show breeds, and it is operated as a visitor attraction.

=== Transition Town Donabate Portrane ===
Donabate's "Transition Town" movement ran a number of projects in the area, including a local weekly food market and developments to change the disused St. Ita's Gardens & Farm into a working community farm and orchard.

== Wildlife ==
In 2008, Fingal County Council published a plan to develop a large wildlife park and natural amenity that would span both sides of the Rogerstown Estuary. Fingal Parks Department gave a summary of some of the features of the plan as:

The proposed development will include new entrances, a car park with 120 car parking spaces, 250 allotments, 3 km (2 mi) of walkways, a new bridge adjacent to the railway bridge, woodland and hedgerow planting, hay meadows,

reintroduction of cattle to graze the grasslands and interpretative facilities.

The plan, as published in 2008, included: bridges over the estuary; pedestrian links with Newbridge and the village; parking facilities; allotments; look-out towers; a new park on the old baleally landfill on the north side of the estuary; picnic areas; and 8 kilometres (5 miles) of woodland and grassland trails.

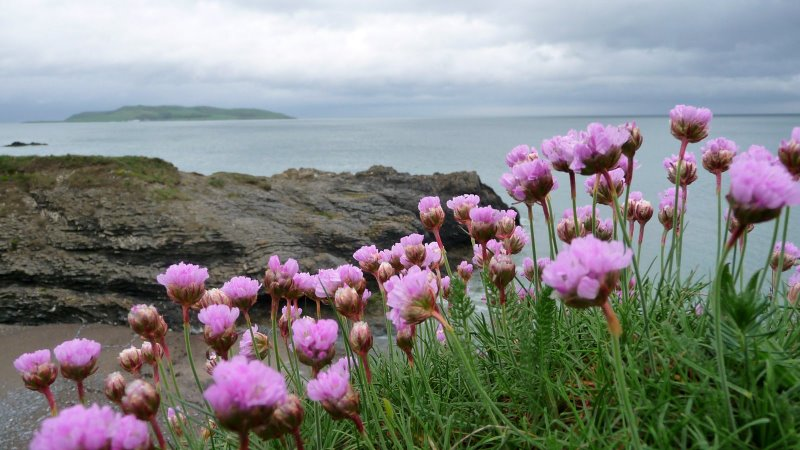
Lambay from the Donabate Portrane Cliff Walk

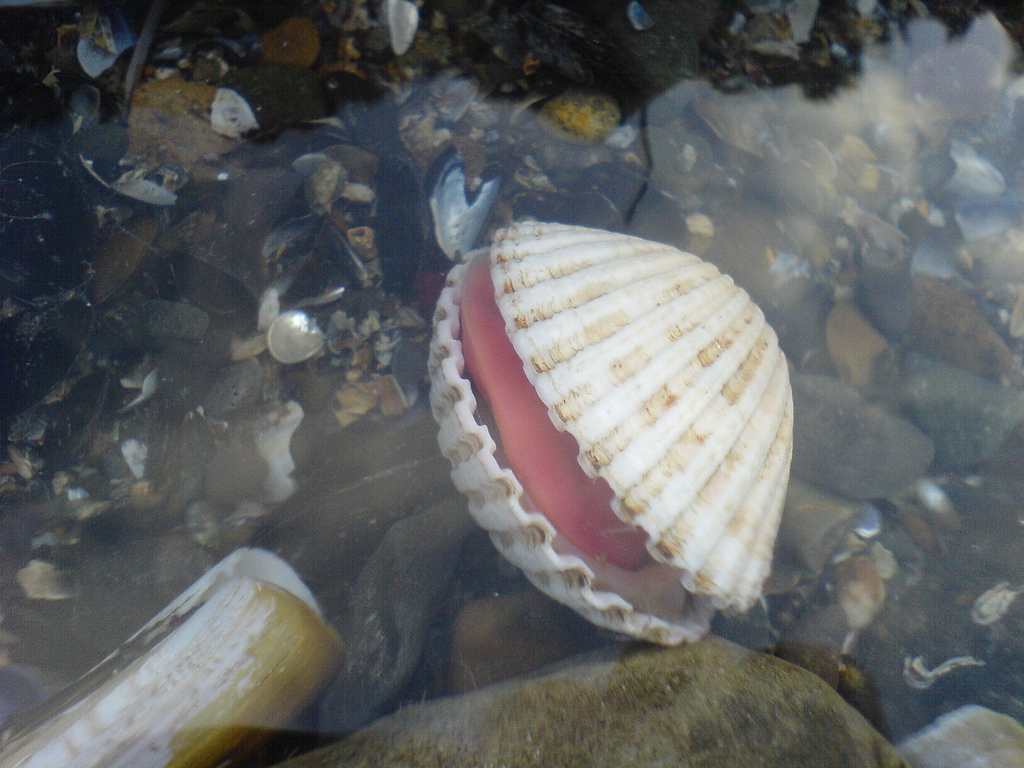
Donabate Beach

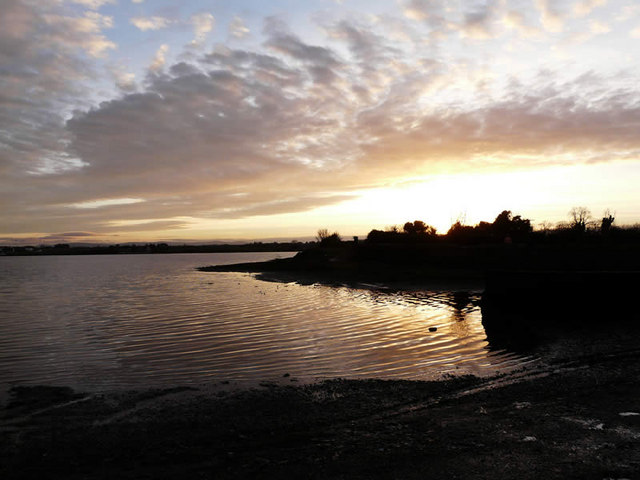
Broadmeadow Estuary in Winter

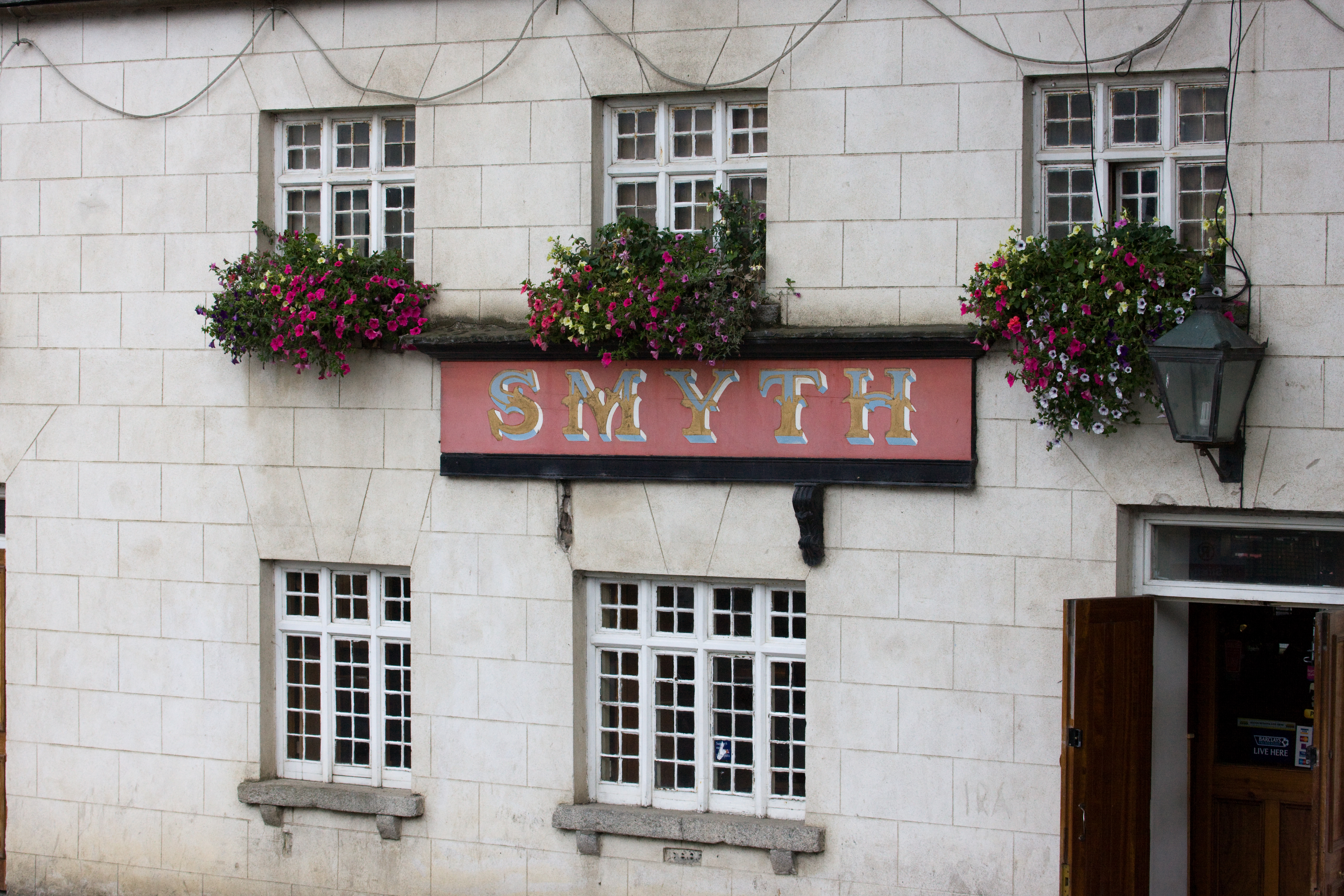
Smyths Donabate village

=== Rogerstown Estuary ===
Rogerstown Estuary is an important wetland habitat. It has several designations in recognition of this including that of Statutory Nature Reserve. BirdWatch Ireland owns land on both the north and south shores of the inner estuary and played a large role in preserving the area in its natural state in spite of its proximity to large urban areas by purchasing tracts of land and entering into management agreements with the Council and landowners. The Fingal Branch of BirdWatch Ireland operates two hides in Rogerstown which are wardened at weekends during certain times of the year.

=== Broadmeadow Estuary ===
Broadmeadow Estuary, like the Rogerstown Estuary, is designated a Special Area of Conservation (SAC) and Special Protection Area (SPA). The estuary has an internationally important population of Brent Goose and nationally important populations of other species of birds.

== Transport ==
=== Rail ===
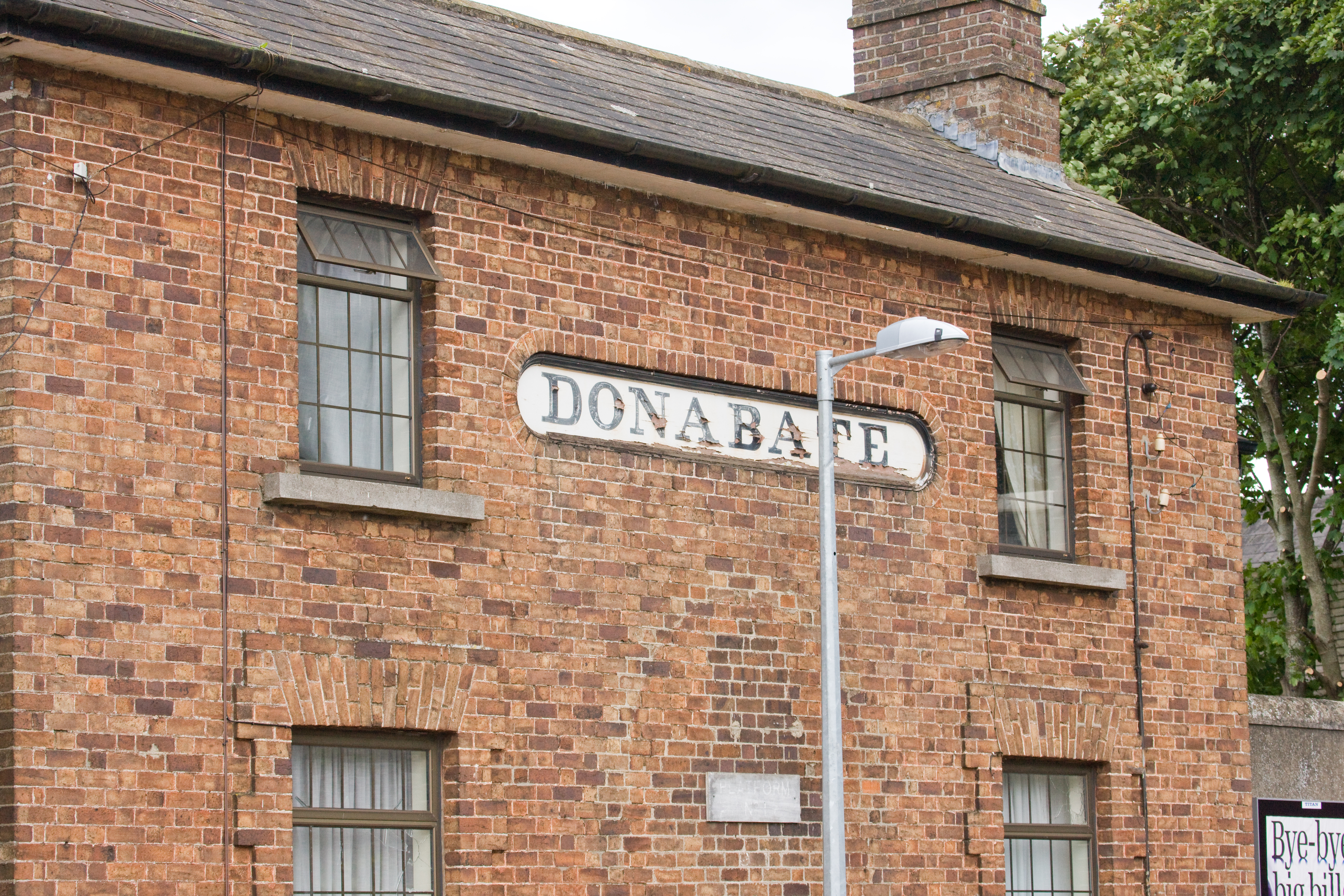
Donabate train station signage

Donabate railway station, in the centre of the town, is on the Belfast–Dublin line and is served by Northern Commuter line trains between Dublin and Dundalk. The Transport 21 infrastructure plan envisaged electrification north of Malahide and through Donabate as far as Balbriggan by 2015, though this was subsequently deferred, with ministerial authorisation to proceed only granted in 2024.

=== Viaduct collapse ===
On 21 August 2009 the 18:07 train from Balbriggan to Connolly was passing over the viaduct when the driver noticed subsidence and the embankment giving way on the northbound track. The train passed over the bridge before it collapsed and the driver alerted authorities. This was later determined to be caused by scour. A catastrophe was avoided but commuters faced significant subsequent disruption. A bus service was added between Donabate and Malahide train stations to facilitate passenger transport.

=== Road ===
The R126 regional road, connecting Portrane to the R127 and the M1 motorway, runs through the town. Go-Ahead Ireland service 33B from Swords to Portrane and Dublin Bus service 33D from Custom House Quay to Portrane serve Donabate. During the morning peak times some service 33 routes serve Donabate.

Owing to the proximity of the area to Dublin city, Dublin Airport and major national road networks, the area houses Tesco Donabate Distribution Centre which is the eleventh largest building in the world by usable volume.

== Notable people ==
- Frances Power Cobbe
- Conor Grant, Irish footballer for Milton Keynes Dons F.C.
- Paddy Neville (1920–1977), sportsman
- Stephen Rea

== See also ==
- List of towns and villages in Ireland
