= Nowen Hill =

Mountain in County Cork, Ireland

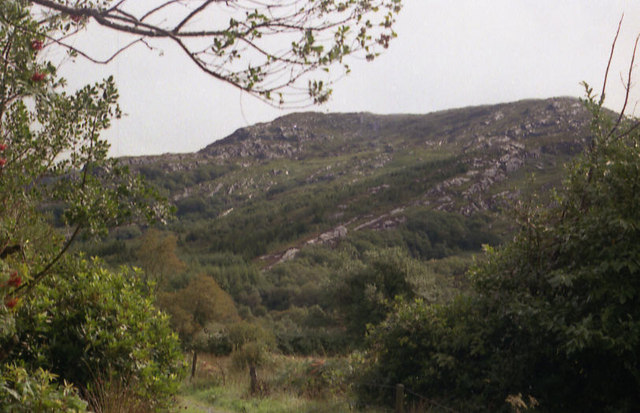
- Nowen Hill from Nowen Hill Farm, Cullenagh

Highest point
- Elevation: 535 m (1,755 ft)
- Prominence: 300.23 m (985.0 ft)
- Listing: Marilyn
- Coordinates: 51°44′N 9°15′W

Naming
- Native name: Cnoc na nAbhann

Geography
- Location within island of Ireland
- Location: County Cork, Ireland
- OSI/OSNI grid: W140529

Nowen Hill (Irish: Cnoc na nAbhann, meaning 'hill of the rivers') is a 535-metre (1,755 ft) tall hill in County Cork, Ireland.

== Transmitter ==
Nowen Hill is the home to the main transmitter of local radio services in Cork to West Cork. Due to the difficult terrain of the service area, transmissions from Nowen Hill are much more powerful than other transmitters in Cork, and even with the much more powerful transmissions, there are a number of blackspots in the transmitter's coverage area. Relays to fill these blackspots exist in Macroom, Bantry, Clonakilty, and Kinsale.

Nowen Hill was also home to a MMDS transmitter.

Frequency	kW	Service
95.4 MHz	5	4FM
95.8 MHz	5	96FM
103.3 MHz	5	C103 (West)
104.5 MHz	8.5	RedFM

=== Relays ===
==== Macroom ====
Frequency	kW	Service
96.2 MHz	0.01	96FM
103.7 MHz	0.01	C103 (West)

==== Clonakilty ====
Frequency	kW	Service
96.2 MHz	0.1	96FM (mono)
103.9 MHz	0.1	C103 West
