= Mount Hillary =

Mountain in Ireland

- Mullach Allaíre
- Location within Ireland

Highest point
- Elevation: 391 m (1,283 ft)
- Prominence: 176 m (577 ft)
- Listing: Marilyn
- Coordinates: 52°07′N 8°50′W

Naming
- Language of name: Irish

Geography
- Location: County Cork, Ireland
- Parent range: Boggeragh Mountains
- OSI/OSNI grid: W425956

Mount Hillary (Irish: Mullach Allaíre) is a mountain located in north County Cork. It is 391m high.

== Name ==
The name Mount Hillary has nothing to do with the forename or surname Hillary. Instead it means 'summit of the partial deafness or echo'. It is also called "Cnoc an Fholair" (Hill of the Eagle) locally.

== Transmitter ==
Mount Hillary is home to the main North Cork transmitter for local services. Red FM's main North Cork transmitter is located near Mallow at Corran Mountain. The multi-city station 4FM's transmitter is located at Bweeng Mountain, 4 km away.

Frequency	kW	Service
96.1 MHz	0.5	96FM
103.7 MHz	1.25	C103 (North)
