= Rogerstown Estuary =

Estuary north of Dublin, Ireland

- Inbhear Bhaile Roiséir
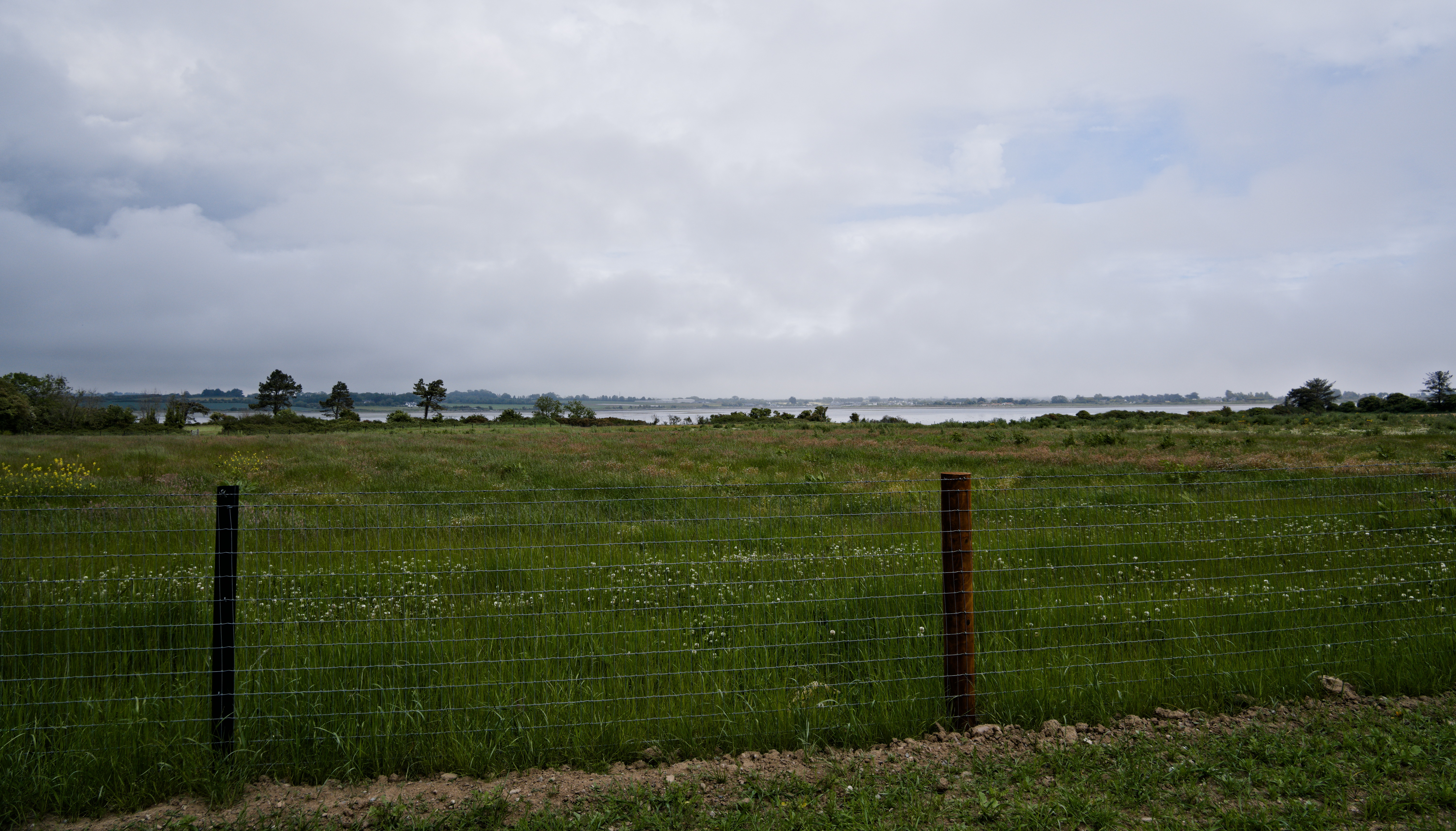
- Interactive map of Rogerstown Estuary
- Location: County Dublin, Ireland
- Coordinates: 53°30′18″N 6°08′06″W
- Area: 482 acres (1.95 km^{2})
- Governing body: Fingal County Council, National Parks and Wildlife Service

Designations

Ramsar Wetland
- Designated: 25 October 1988
- Reference no.: 412

Rogerstown Estuary (Irish: Inbhear Bhaile Roiséir) is a sea inlet and estuary in Ireland. It is situated just north of the Donabate-Portrane peninsula, and also south of Rush, on Ireland's east coast about 25 km (16 mi) north of Dublin. It is a designated nature reserve, Special Area of Conservation, and a Ramsar site.

The main flow into the estuary comes from the Ballyboghil River and its terminal tributary, the Corduff Stream. Other watercourses entering the estuary include one from Portrane, Balleally Stream, and also Bride's Stream and Jone's Stream, from the Lusk area, and a number of small flows.

The estuary is made up of saltwater marshes, raised salt marsh, wet meadows and riverine shallows and creeks. It covers an area of 3.63 km^{2} (900 acres), and is divided by a causeway and bridge built in the 1840s to carry the main Dublin–Belfast railway line.

It is internationally recognised as one of the most important east coast sites and is vital for wintering wildfowl and waders and birds on passage. Birds come to the estuary from the Arctic. It supports an internationally important population of Brent Geese and a further 14 species in numbers of national importance. The former Balleally landfill site located by the railway causeway was landscaped and reopened as Rogerstown Park in 2019.

The site is a statutory Nature Reserve and a candidate Special Area of Conservation under the E.U. Habitats Directive.

The estuary's mouth separates the beaches of Portrane and Rush, and the mouth is so narrow, it is theorised that a person would be able to cross from Rush to Portrane at a gradual walking pace, within a time span of less than a minute, if there was no water.

The townland of Turvey touches on the estuary. It is associated with the Goban Saor described as the son of Tuirbe Tragmar ("thrower of axes"), a figure whose magical axe would hold back the sea after it was thrown on the strand. This feat was said to have been performed at Tráig Tuirbi, Tuirbe's Strand or Turvey.
