= Clonmeen House =

19th-century house in County Cork, Ireland

- Location within County Cork

General information
- Architectural style: Tudor Revival
- Location: Gougane townland, County Cork, Ireland
- Coordinates: 52°08′11″N 8°51′26″W
- Completed: 1893

Design and construction
- Architect: George Ashlin

Clonmeen House is a country house in the townland of Gougane 3 km from the village of Banteer in County Cork, Ireland. It was built in 1893 to designs by George Ashlin. It is included on the Record of Protected Structures published by Cork County Council.

== History ==
The land at Gougane where Clonmeen House stands was originally owned by the O'Callaghans, a Gaelic clan whose chieftains were buried in the nearby Clonmeen Church. The O'Callaghans retained control of the property until the 1750s, when they sold it to the Roche family, who were wealthy merchants involved in the shipping trade in Limerick. In the 1830, John Roche bequeathed his property at Gougane and Clonmeen to his nephew George Grehan (1813-1885). The Grehan family were wealthy Dublin wine merchants and George Grehan's father, Stephen Grehan (1776-1871), had been the first Catholic director of the Bank of Ireland.

Clonmeen House was built in 1893 by George Grehan's son Stephen Grehan (1859–1937) to replace the original Georgian family residence on the estate Clonmeen Lodge (built circa 1750). Clonmeen House was designed by architect George Ashlin who was co-designer (with Pugin) of Cobh Cathedral. Clonmeen house is a large east-facing house built in Victorian-Tudor style with half-timbered gables and other ornamental exterior features. Above the main door there are three ornamental carved shields, one bearing Stephen Grehan's monogram, another giving the year of construction and the third depicting the Grehan family crest accompanied by their family motto Ne Oubliez (never forget). The house was constructed using dressed red sandstone quarried at Mount Hillary.

The last member of the Grehan family to reside at Clonmeen House was Major Stephen A. Grehan (1895–1972). A graduate of the Royal Military Academy at Woolwich in England, he served with the Royal Field Artillery during the First World War and fought on the Western Front and in Salonica. He later served in the British army campaign in Mesopotamia (modern-day Iraq) from 1918 until 1922. Major Grehan resigned his commission in the British Army after the death of his father in 1937 and returned to live at Clonmeen. Though Ireland had since become independent, Major Grehan maintained his links with the British Army by serving as the North Cork representative of the Royal British Legion.

After Major Grehan's death in 1972, Clonmeen House was sold to Austrian born Eva Fuss who operated a hotel there that was run by the Ott family. The hotel closed in 1999 and most of the original contents and furniture were sold by public auction. The house was then purchased as a family home by Don Day, a Canadian businessman. In 2012 Clonmeen House was purchased by its current owners, the Sheehy family.
