= 96FM =

96FM may refer to:

- Cork's 96FM, radio station in Cork, Ireland
- Gold 96FM, radio station in Perth, Western Australia
