= Paddy Neville =

Irish sportsman

Personal information
- Full name: Patrick Augustine Neville
- Born: 22 June 1920; Donabate, Ireland
- Died: 16 July 1977 (aged 57); Dublin, Leinster, Ireland
- Batting: Right-handed

Domestic team information
- Years: Team
- 1956–1960: Ireland

Career statistics
Competition	First-class
Matches	4
Runs scored	143
Batting average	17.87
100s/50s	–/–
Top score	38
Balls bowled	0
Wickets	–
Bowling average	–
5 wickets in innings	–
10 wickets in match	–
Best bowling	–
Catches/stumpings	4/–
- Source: Cricinfo, 23 November 2018

Patrick Augustine Neville (22 June 1920 – 16 July 1977) was an Irish sportsman who played cricket, hockey, football, and Gaelic football.

Neville was born at Donabate in County Dublin, and was educated at O'Connell School in Dublin. He began playing club cricket for Leinster in 1941, before moving to Malahide, where he was to play the majority of his club cricket. He made his debut in first-class cricket for Ireland against Marylebone Cricket Club (MCC) in 1956 at Dublin. After his debut, he played a number of minor matches against Sussex in 1956, as well as the touring New Zealanders and Worcestershire, both in 1959. He made a second first-class appearance in 1959, against Leicestershire on Ireland's tour of England. He made two further first-class appearances, both in 1960 against Scotland at Paisley, and the MCC at Dublin. Across his four first-class matches, Neville scored a total of 143 runs at an average of 17.87, with a highest score of 38.

Besides cricket, Neville also played several other sports to a high level. He played field hockey at international level for the Ireland national field hockey team, as well as playing football for Drumcondra and Dundalk as a goalkeeper, also winning four caps for the League of Ireland XI. He also played Gaelic football for Parnells in Dublin; however the 'Ban' resulted in Neville being banned from playing by the Gaelic Athletic Association (GAA), after the GAA discovered him playing hockey under his mother's maiden name. Outside of sport, Neville worked as a psychiatric nurse. He died unexpectedly at Dublin in July 1977. The Neville Cup, contested annually by hockey clubs based in Leinster, is named after Neville and his brother, John.
