= Saints Peter and Paul's Church, Cork =

Coordinates: 51.898809°N 8.474461°W

Ss. Peter & Paul's Church
- Saints Peter and Paul's Church, Cork
- Eaglais Naoimh Peadar agus Pól
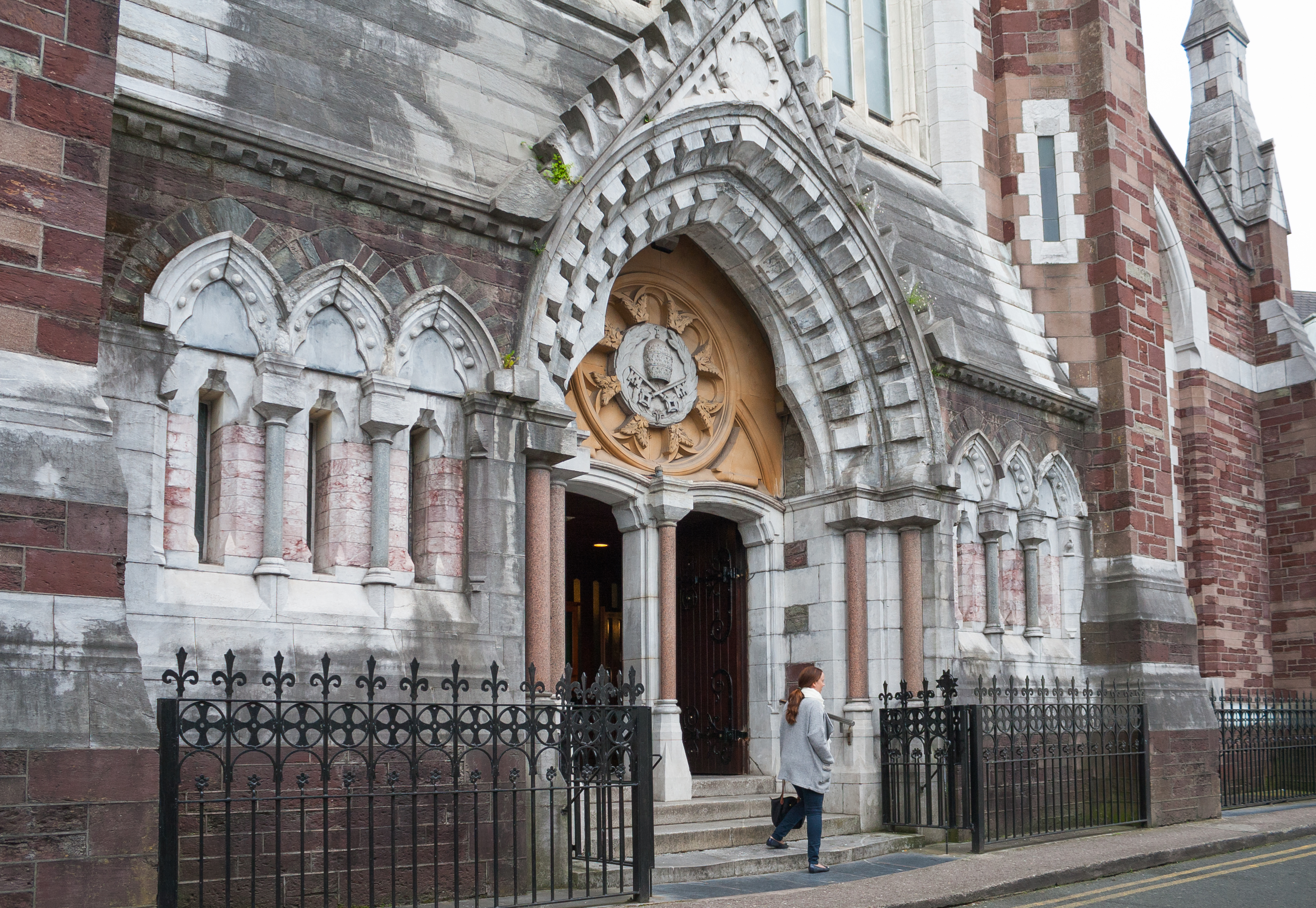
- Portal at Saint Peter and Paul's Place

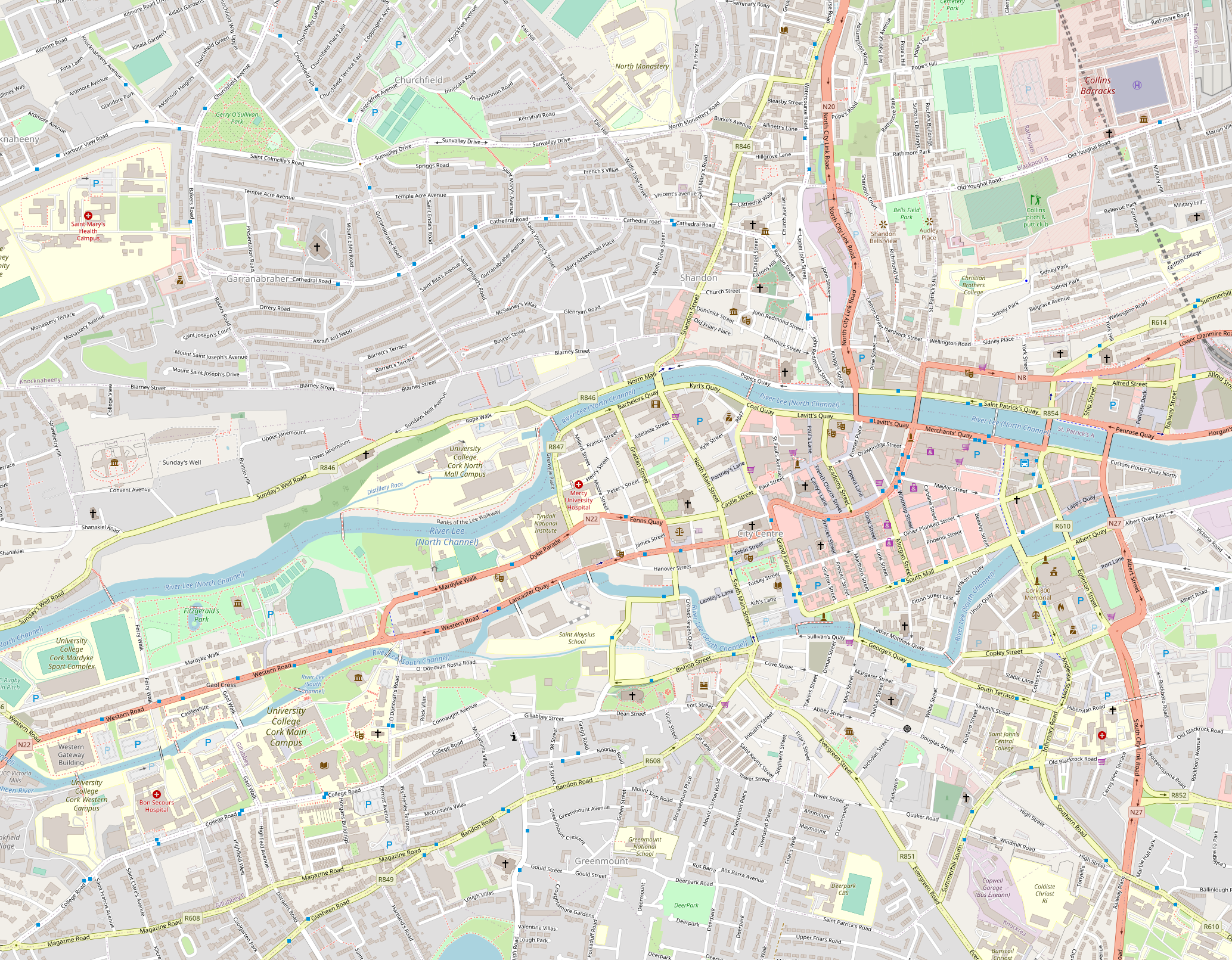
- Location within Cork Central
- Location: Saint Peter and Paul's Place, Cork
- Country: Ireland
- Denomination: Roman Catholic
- Website: saintspeterandpauls.ie

History
- Status: In use
- Dedication: Saint Peter and Saint Paul
- Consecrated: August 1874

Architecture
- Architect(s): E. W. Pugin and George Ashlin
- Architectural type: Church
- Style: Gothic Revival
- Groundbreaking: 15 August 1859
- Completed: 1866

Administration
- Archdiocese: Cashel and Emly
- Diocese: Cork and Ross
- Parish: SS Peter & Paul's

The nave of SS Peter and Paul's, shown in The Illustrated London News.

Saints Peter and Paul's Church is a Catholic church located on Carey's Lane in Cork City, Ireland.

== History ==
Peter and Paul's was built to replace Carey's Lane Chapel, a much smaller structure built in 1786.

Under the guidance of Archdeacon John Murphy, a design competition was run in the 1850s and won by E. W. Pugin, son of Augustus Pugin. The foundation stone was laid on 15 August 1859. Though the construction of the church was completed in on 29 June 1864, and the public were granted the opportunity to view the interior of the church at this time, the church was unable to open as the debts associated with its construction had not yet been paid off. Exactly two years after the church first welcomed members of the public to enter, it was dedicated for worship on 29 June 1866.

In 1930, an associated Scout Group was formed, the 4th Cork (Ss Peter and Paul's) meeting in Brown Street, then Castle Street and now Gilabbey Park, though no longer directly connected to the parish.

Between 1939 and 1962, the roof of the building was renewed, and the baptistry was repaired.

In the 1980s the building underwent major renovations.

== Architecture ==
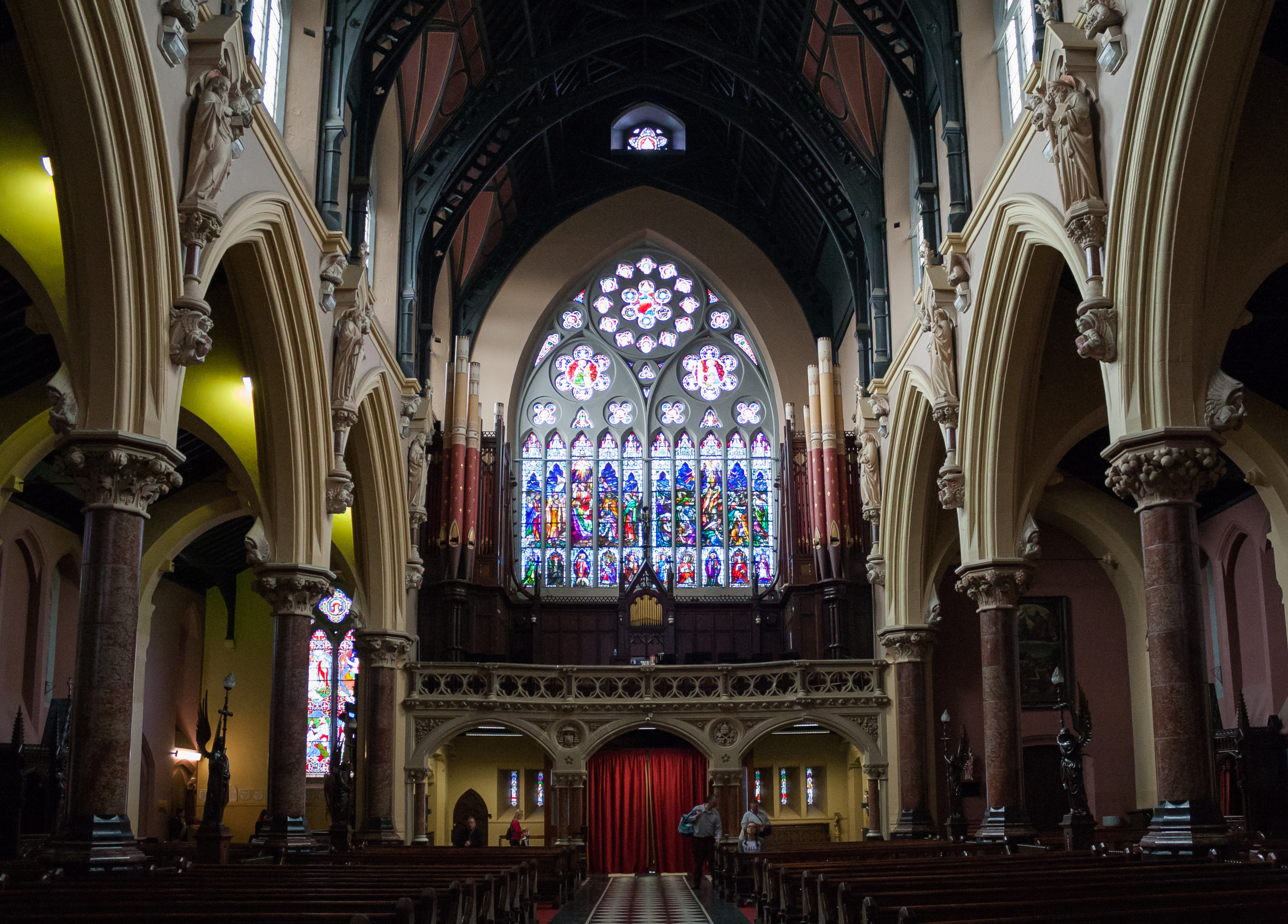
Interior with stained glass

The church comprises a central nave with gable roof and two aisles. The walls are of red sandstone with limestone dressing. The aisles are at either side of the nave, which is covered with a gable roof. The roof is supported by open timber work. The beams sit on corbels which are carved with images of the choir of angels. The grand altar is carved from 36 tons of Carrara marble. The pavements surrounding the altar, and the steps, are all of white Italian vein marble. The apse is decorated with blue and gold ceiling panels. The flooring of the church is in white and black marble.

The pulpit and confessionals were carved from Russian oak by craftsmen from Leuven and Cork.
