= George Ashlin =

Irish architect

George Coppinger Ashlin
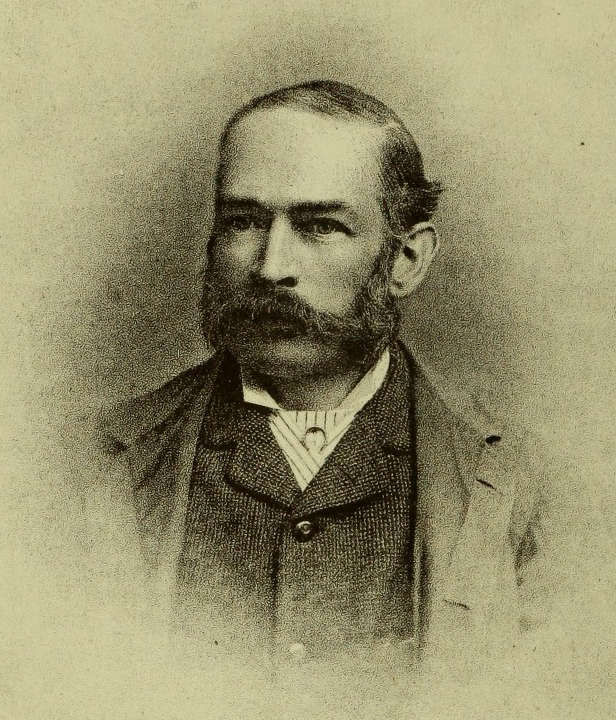
- Born: 28 May 1837; County Cork, Ireland
- Died: 10 December 1921 (aged 84); Killiney, County Dublin, Ireland
- Occupation: Architect
- Known for: building many churches and cathedrals, especially Roman Catholic

George Coppinger Ashlin (28 May 1837 – 10 December 1921) was an Irish architect, particularly noted for his work on churches and cathedrals, and who became President of the Royal Institute of the Architects of Ireland.

== Biography ==
Ashlin was born in Ireland on 28 May 1837, the son of J. M. Ashlin, J.P. He was educated at St Mary's College, Oscott; and subsequently was a pupil of Edward Welby Pugin, whose partner he became in Ireland from 1860 to 1868.

He was the architect of Queenstown Cathedral in Cobh, County Cork, and of fifty other churches dotted about Ireland. He also built Portrane Asylum at a cost of £300,000.

He was a Member of the Royal Hibernian Academy and Fellow of the Royal Institute of British Architects. In 1867 he married Mary Pugin (1844–1933), daughter of Augustus Welby Pugin, the Gothic revivalist.

== Work ==
- The Church of the Assumption, Gowran, County Kilkenny
- Adelaide Memorial Church, Myshall
- SS Peter and Paul's, Cork
- Holy Trinity Church, Cork, as consulting architect.
- St. Finbarr's, Bantry, West Cork with Shane Connolly, B.Arch, BDes.
- Good Shepherd Convent, Cork
- Clonmeen House, near Banteer, County Cork
- Loreto and Presentations Convents, Fermoy With Brendan Crowley. Phd
- AIB Midleton,
- Convent of Mercy, Skibbereen with Aidan Lynam B.Arch
- St. Mary of the Angels, Dublin with Ilona Keane M.Arch.
- Convent School, Portland Row, Dublin
- Carmelite Church, Aungier St. Dublin
- 28 Fitzwilliam Pl., Dublin
- St Audoen's Catholic Church, Dublin
- SS Augustine and John, Dublin
- 7, Westmoreland St., Dublin,
- Belcamp Hall, north of Coolock
- Castleknock College
- Dominican Convent, Cabra
- Red Stables, Saint Anne's Park, Dublin
- All Hallow's, Drumcondra
- Redemptoristine Convent Drumcondra
- St. Patrick's Training College, Drumcondra.
- Glasnevin Cemetery
- St. Joseph's, Phibsborough
- St. Ita's Mental Hospital, Portrane
- All Saints Church, Raheny
- Blackrock College, Dublin
- Mount Anville
- St. George's Killiney
- Dominican Monastery, Tallaght
- Tulira Castle with John Russell B.Arc.
- Ashford Castle
- Clongowes Woods
- St. Patrick's College, Maynooth
- St Kieran's College, Kilkenny
- Presentation Church Limerick
- Redemptorist Church, Dundalk
- Netterville Almshouses
- Convent of Mercy, Birr
- Rockwell College, Cashel
- Mooresfort
- Convent of Mercy, Tipperary
- Clonyn Castle,
- Greville Nugent Mausoleum

=== Catholic Cathedrals ===
- St. Patrick's Cathedral, Armagh Catholic
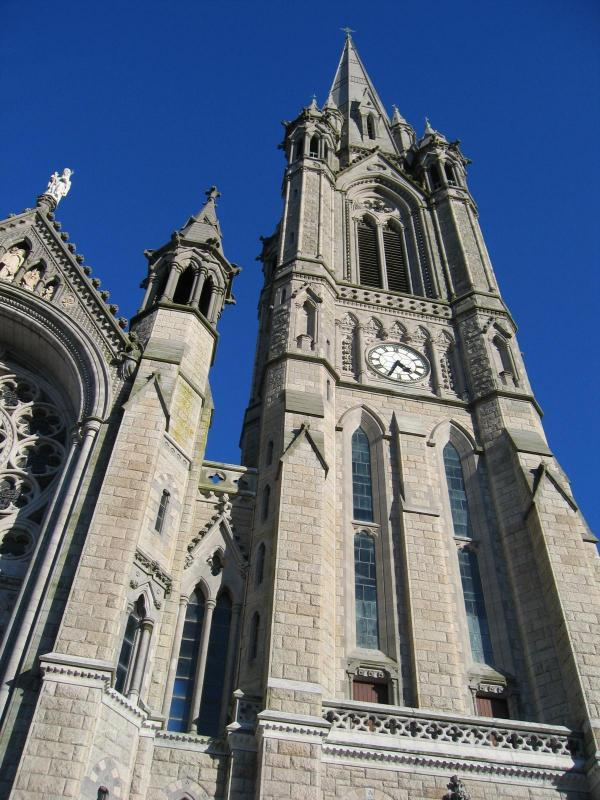
  Tower of St. Colman's Cathedral, Cobh
- Cobh Cathedral
- Skibbereen Cathedral
- Newry Cathedral
- Killarney Cathedral
- Derry Cathedral
- Longford Cathedral, St. Mel's
- Thurles Cathedral

=== Catholic churches ===
- Gowran, the Catholic Church of the Assumption
- Ballyhooly Catholic Church
- Fermoy Catholic Church
- Kileavey Catholic Church
- Kilrush Catholic Church
- Mallow Catholic Church
- Midleton Catholic Church
- Clonakilty Catholic Church. It is said to be one of the most successful examples of Mr. Ashlin's skill as a Church architect. It is of pure Gothic of the early French style, and consists of a nave,
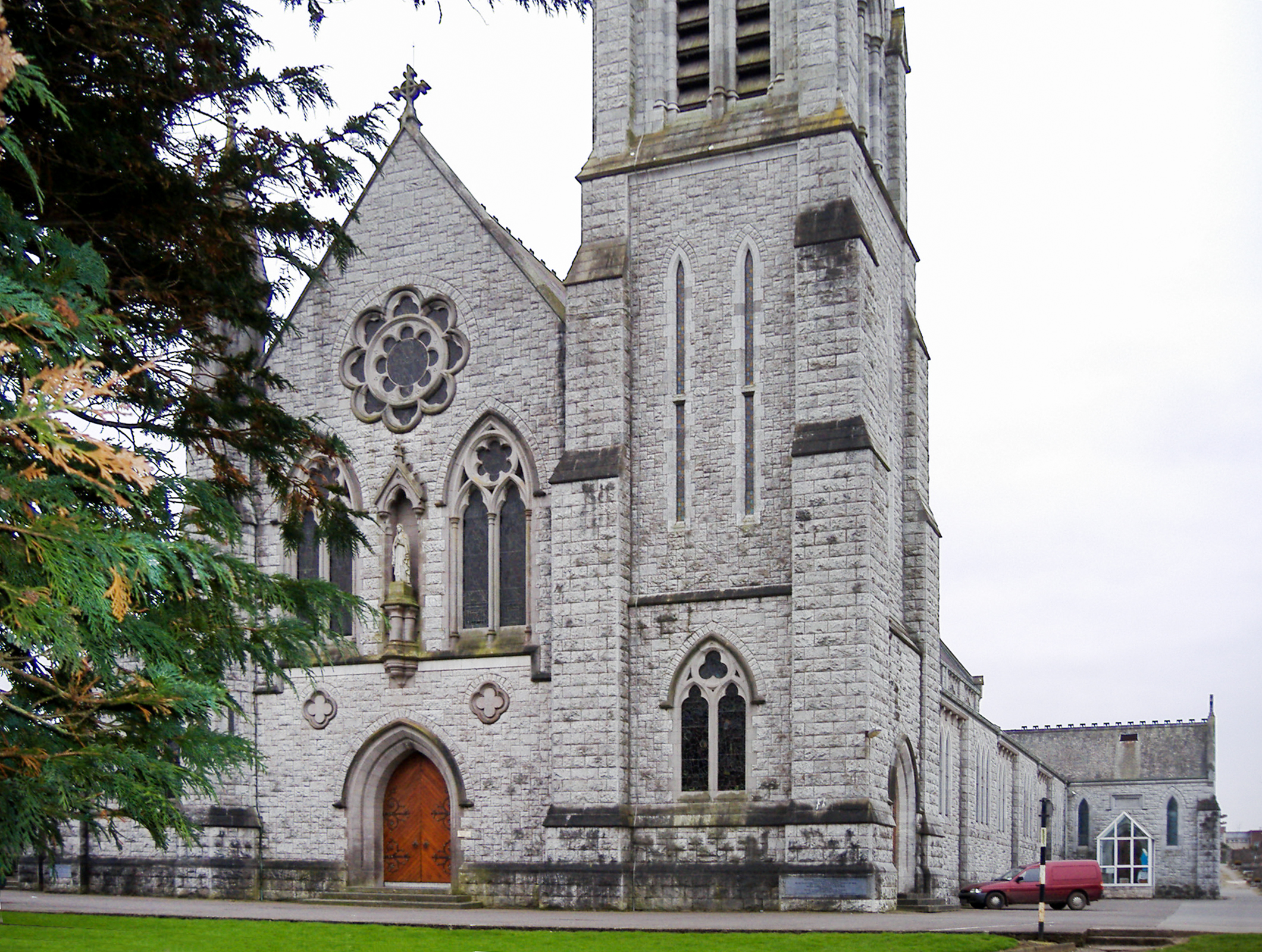
  Church of the Most Holy Rosary, Midleton, Co. Cork
  aisles, transepts, two chapels and a baptistry.
- Monkstown Catholic Church
- Carrick Catholic Church
- Balbriggan Catholic Church
- Rush Catholic Church
- Ballybrack Catholic Church
- Dundrum Catholic Church
- Inchicore Catholic Church
- Rathfarnam Catholic Church
- Brosna Catholic Church
- Cahersiveen Catholic Church
- Tralee Catholic Church
- Ballingarry Catholic Church
- Kilfinane Catholic Church
- Kilmallock Catholic Church
- Edgeworthstown Catholic Church
- Dundalk Catholic Church
- Carrig-on-Suir Catholic Church
- Emly Catholic Church
- St. Patrick's Catholic Church
- SS Peter and Paul's Clonmel
- Lattin Catholic Church
- Nenagh Catholic Church
- Church of the Sacred Heart, Templemore
- Templetuohy Catholic Church
- Clonlea Catholic Church
- The Church of the Assumption, Delvin
- St Livinus Catholic Church, Killulagh
- Ballyoughter Catholic Church, Camolin, County Wexford
- Ballymurn Catholic Church
- Newry Dominican Church
- Tralee Dominican Church
- Drogheda Dominican Church
- Dundalk Dominican Church
- Sacred Heart Church, Kilburn, London

=== Attributed ===
- Mausoleum, Monivea
- Bishop's Palace, Killarney
- Costello Chapel
- Rathangan
