= Central Mental Hospital =

- National Forensic Mental Health Service
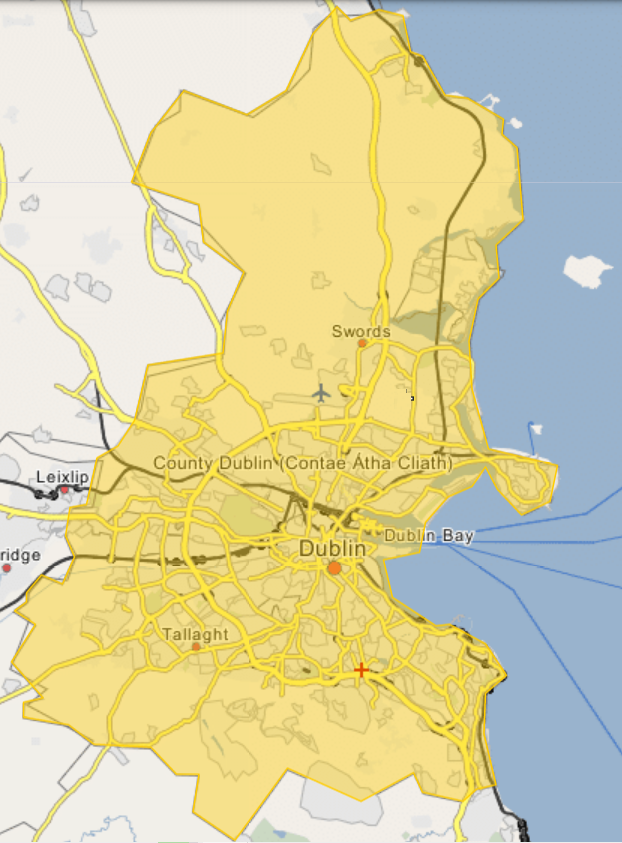
- Shown in Co. Dublin

Geography
- Location: Portrane, Fingal, Ireland
- Coordinates: 53.48°N 6.122°W

Organisation
- Type: Specialist
- Religious affiliation: Non-denominational

Services
- Beds: 84
- Speciality: Secure psychiatric hospital

History
- Founded: 1850 (old facility); 2020 (new facility)

Links
- Website: https://www.hse.ie/eng/national-forensic-mental-health-service-portrane/

The Central Mental Hospital (Irish: An Príomh-Oispidéal Meabhar-Ghalar) is a mental health facility housing forensic patients in Portrane, Dublin, Ireland. The hospital, along with a community day centre for outpatients at Usher's Island, forms part of the National Forensic Mental Health Service.

== History ==
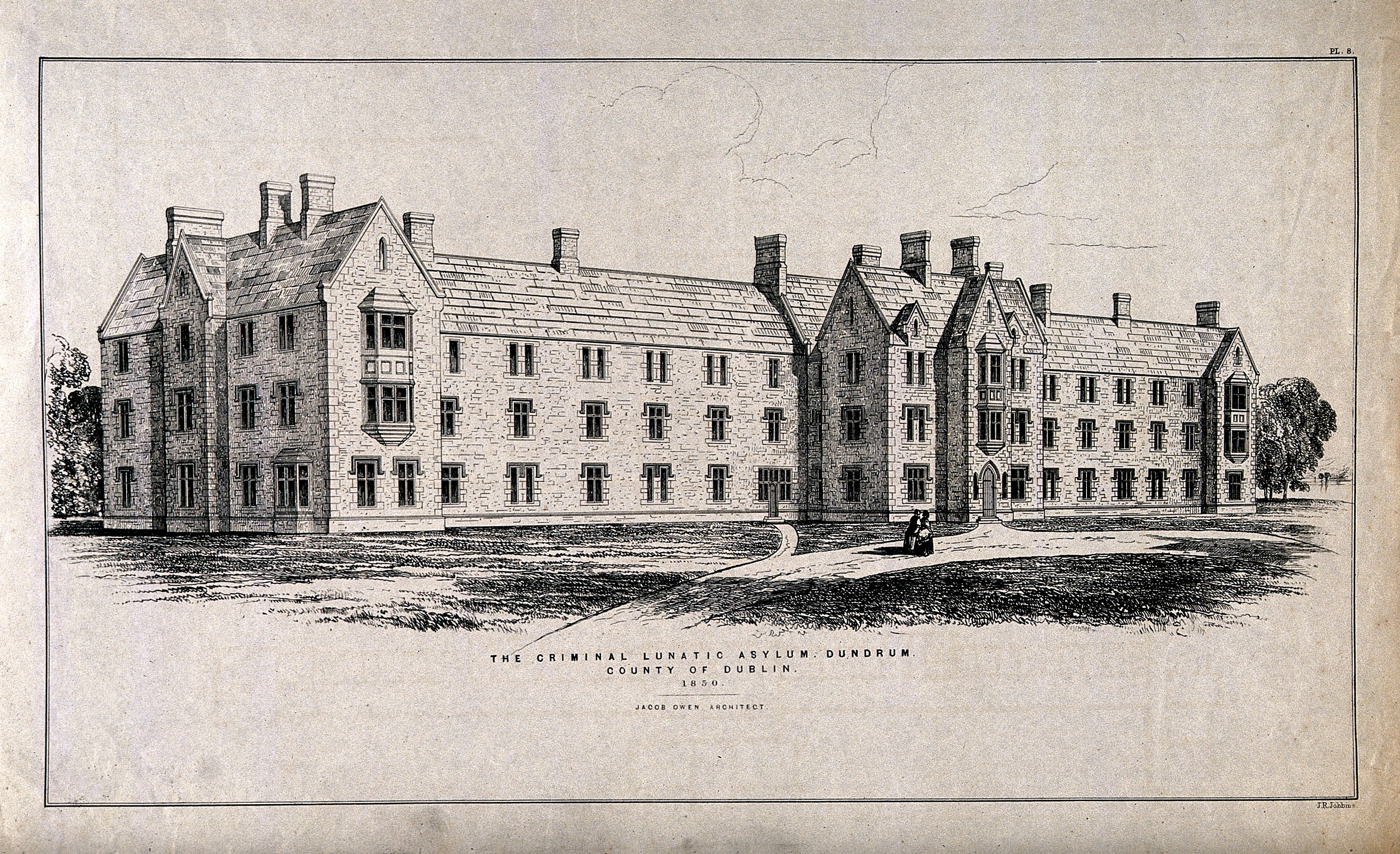
Dundrum Central Criminal Lunatic Asylum for Ireland, 1850

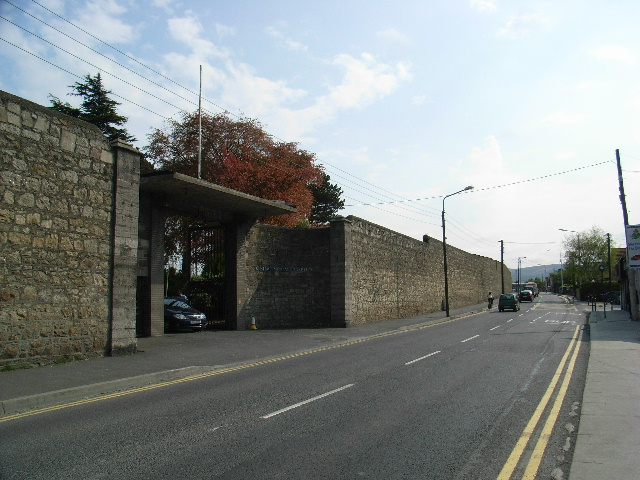
The old hospital site at Dundrum

=== Dundrum ===
The hospital originally opened as the Central Criminal Lunatic Asylum for Ireland at Dundrum in Dublin in 1850. This was an early move of an initiative throughout the United Kingdom and its colonies which included the building of Broadmoor Hospital in England. The site was originally chosen to be soothing to mental health patients and was intentionally not linked to any particular prison service to maintain the distinction between criminality and illness.

=== Portrane ===
The Health Service Executive (HSE) announced in February 2012 that the hospital would relocate to the former site of the old St. Ita's Hospital in Portrane in the north of County Dublin. The construction works were undertaken by Rhatigan OHL at a cost of €140 million. The new facility opened in November 2022.
