= St. Ita's Hospital =

- Health Service Executive
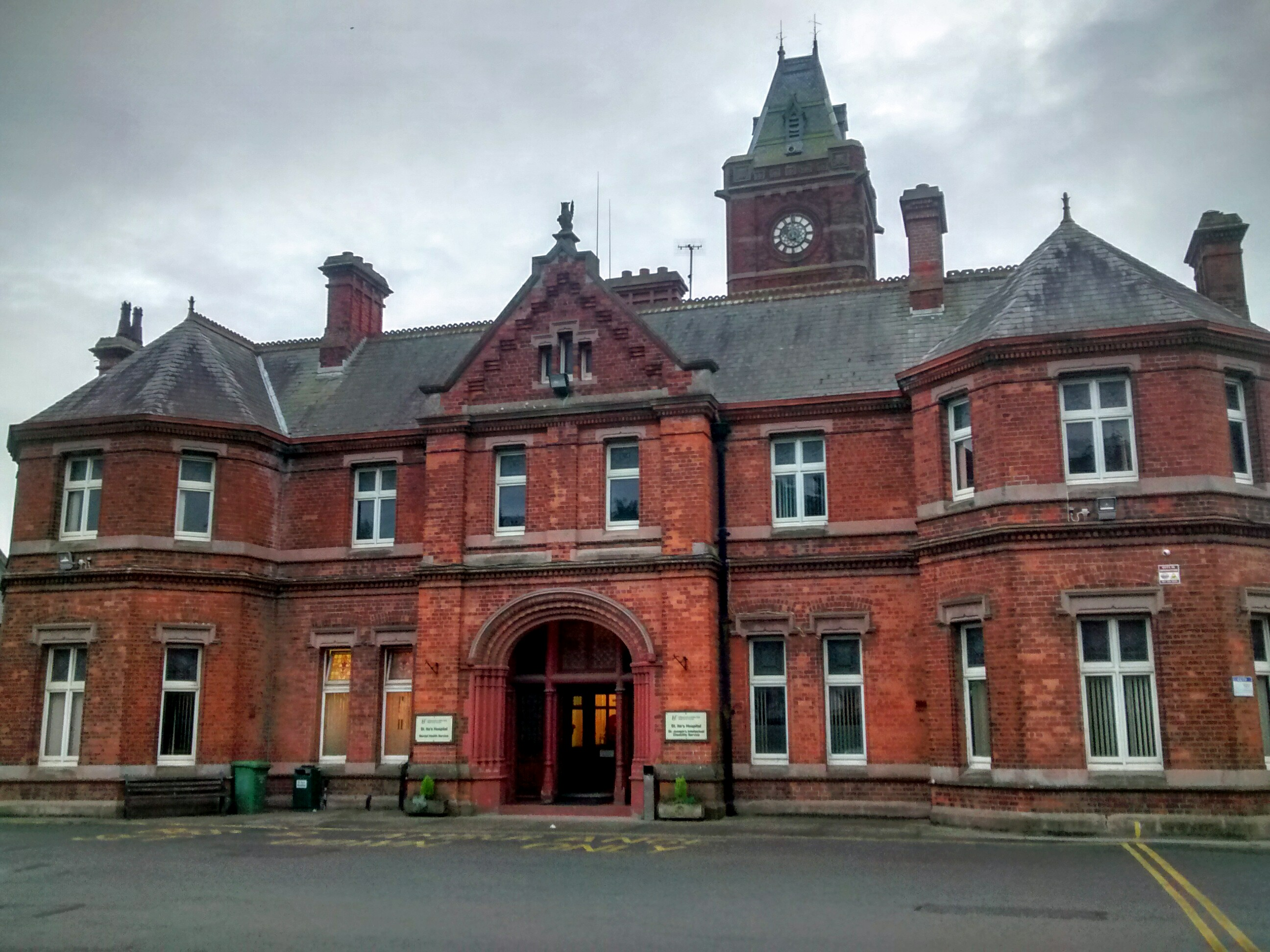
- Entrance to St Ita's Hospital

- Shown in Ireland

Geography
- Location: Portrane, Dublin, Ireland
- Coordinates: 53.486798°N 6.113066°W

Organisation
- Care system: HSE
- Type: Specialist

Services
- Beds: 200
- Speciality: Psychiatric Hospital

History
- Founded: 1903
- Closed: 2014

St. Ita's Hospital (Irish: Ospidéal Naomh Ita) is a mental health facility in Portrane in the north of County Dublin in Ireland.

== History ==
The site selected for the facility, which covered 460 acres (1.9 km^{2}), was the demesne surrounding Portrane House, the former home of the Evans family. The facility was the subject of a design competition which was won by George Ashlin but his proposed price exceeded the budgeted cost and he was asked to reduce the price: the eminent architect, Sir Thomas Drew, objected to Ashlin being selected on this basis. The facility, which was ultimately designed by Ashlin in the Gothic Revival style, opened as the Portrane Asylum in 1903. At a cost of £300,000 it was the most expensive building ever commissioned up to that time by the British Government in Ireland.

Irish republican Michael Staines was chairman of the hospital board and on one occasion spent the night there while on the run in 1920.

St. Ita's Hospital Radio commenced broadcasting in December 1983 and was the first radio station in Ireland to receive one of the new broadcast licenses after the provisions of the Broadcasting bill were brought into operation in 1988.

After the introduction of deinstitutionalisation in the late 1980s, the hospital went into a period of decline. Nearly 500,000 viewers watched an episode of the RTÉ documentary The Asylum which featured St Ita's Hospital in 2005.

In June 2010, the Mental Health Commission instructed the hospital to stop the admission of acute patients on account of the "entirely unacceptable and inhumane conditions" by 28 February 2011. The hospital closed to inpatients in March 2011 and to outpatients as well in January 2014.

The Health Service Executive (HSE) announced in February 2012 that the Central Mental Hospital would relocate to the former site of the old St Ita's Hospital. The new hospital was completed in 2020, however, construction work and industrial relations issues delayed the opening until November 2022.

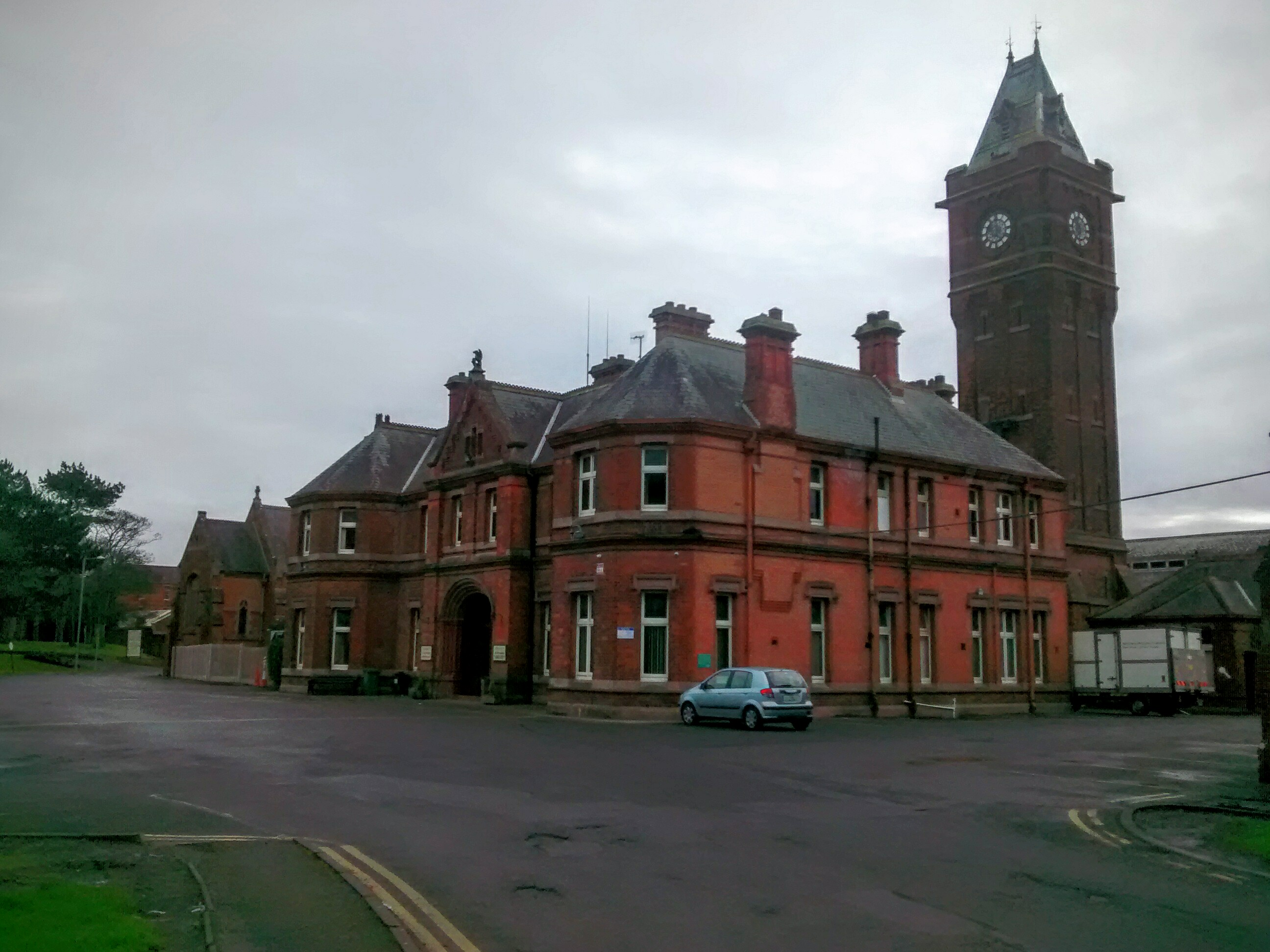
St. Ita's Hospital
