= R127 road (Ireland) =

Road in Ireland

R127 road
- Bóthar R127

Location
- Country: Ireland

Highway system
- Roads in Ireland; Motorways; Primary; Secondary; Regional

The R127 road is a regional road in Fingal, Ireland.

The official description of the R127 from the Roads Act 1993 (Classification of Regional Roads) Order 2012 reads:

R127: Blake's Cross - Skerries - Balbriggan, County Dublin

Between its junction with R132 at Blakes Cross and its junction with R132 at Dublin Street Balbriggan via Coldwinters, Bridetree; Rathmore Road at Lusk; Balcunnin; Dublin Road, Thomas Hand Street and Balbriggan Street in the town of Skerries; Barnageeragh: Lawless Terrace, Gibbons Terrace and Market Green in the town of Balbriggan all in the county of Fingal.

== See also ==
- Roads in Ireland
- National primary road
- National secondary road
- Regional road
