= R126 road (Ireland) =

Road in Ireland

R126 road
- Bóthar R126

Location
- Country: Ireland

Highway system
- Roads in Ireland; Motorways; Primary; Secondary; Regional

The R126 road is a regional road in Fingal, Ireland.

The official description of the R126 from the Roads Act 1993 (Classification of Regional Roads) Order 2012 reads:

R126: Lissenhall - Portrane, County Dublin

Between its junction with R132 at Lissenhall Great and its terminal point at the car park at Portraine via Hearse Road, Lanestown, Donabate, Bellalease and the Quay Road at Portraine all in the county of Fingal.

== See also ==
- Roads in Ireland
- National primary road
- National secondary road
- Regional road
