= Portrane =

Seaside village north of Dublin, Ireland

Portrane Port Reachrann (Irish)
- Village
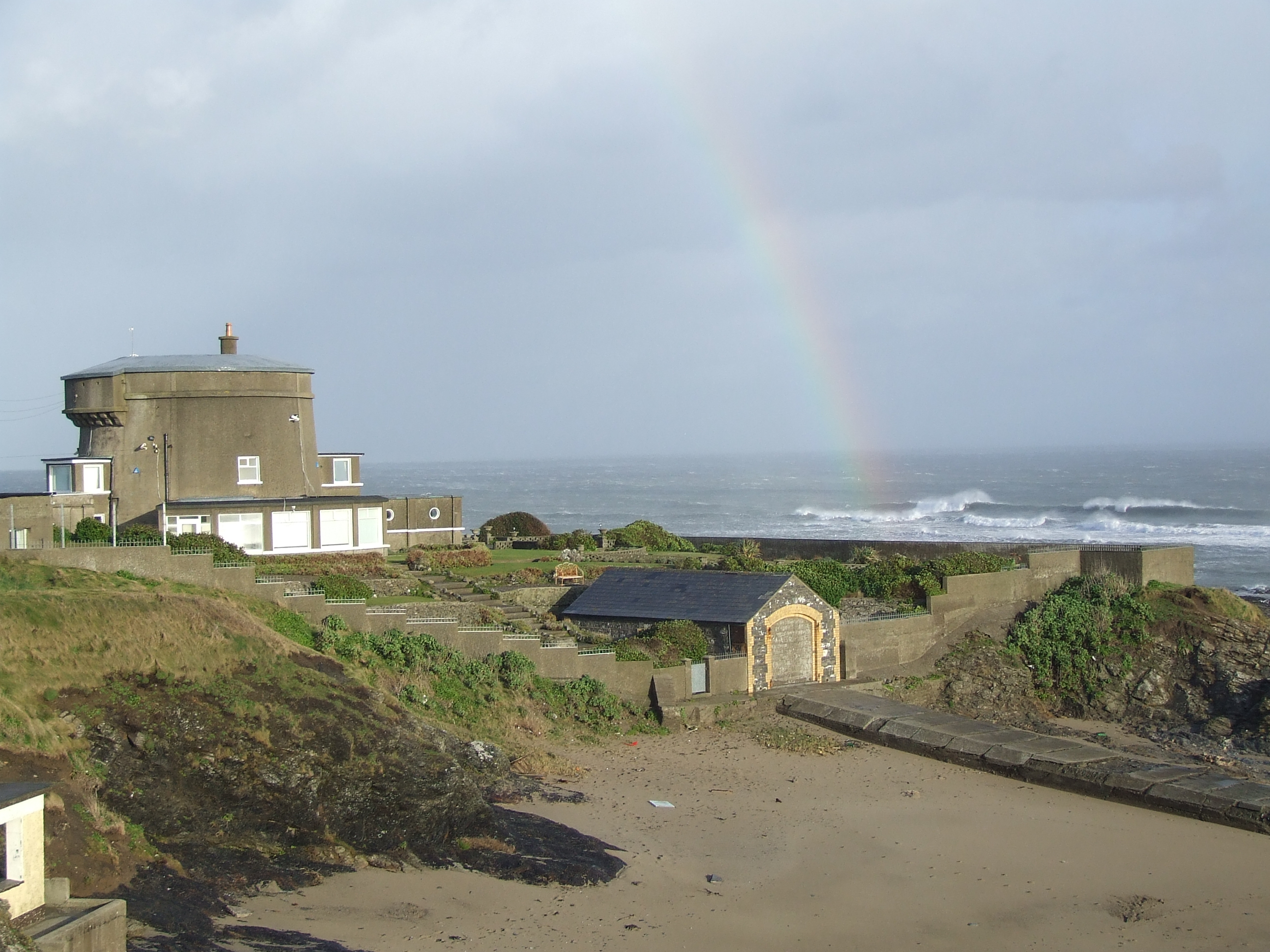
- Portrane Martello Tower

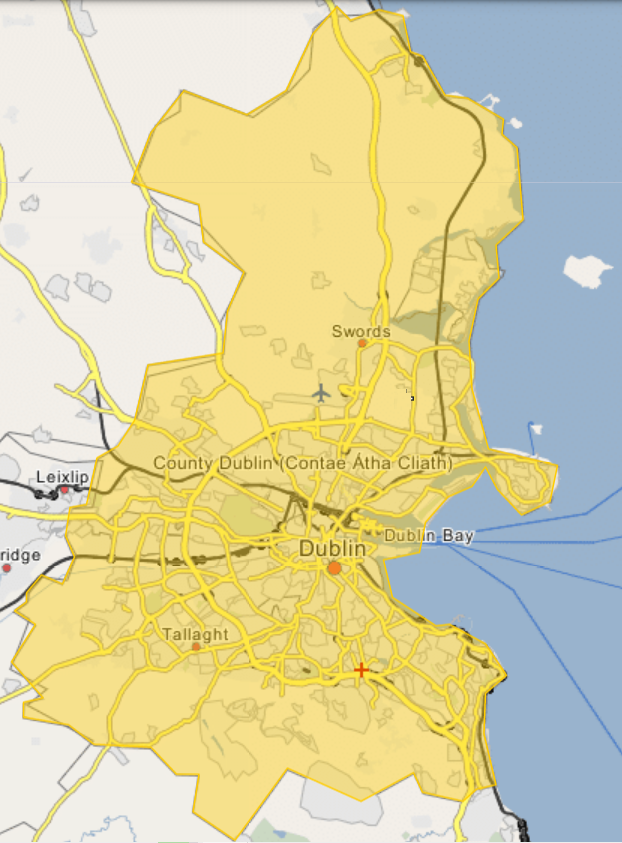
- Location in County Dublin
- Coordinates: 53°29′36″N 6°06′53″W
- Country: Ireland
- Province: Leinster
- County: County Dublin
- Local government area: Fingal

Government
  - Dáil constituency: Dublin Fingal
  - EP constituency: Dublin

Population (2022)
  - Total: 1,262
- Time zone: UTC+0 (WET)
  - Summer (DST): UTC-1 (IST (WEST))
- Irish Grid Reference: O254510

Portrane or Portraine (Irish: Port Reachrann) is a small seaside village located three kilometres from the town of Donabate in Fingal, County Dublin in Ireland. It is in the barony of Nethercross in the north of the county.

Portrane has an approximately 2 km (1.2 mi) long sandy beach backed by sand dunes in places on the north end. There is a small carpark and access to the beach is restricted to pedestrians. At the very north end of the beach is a National Heritage Area, which is visited by various migratory birds during winter time.

== Built heritage ==
There are several notable historic buildings in Portrane, including a 19th-century martello tower. Other notable examples include;

=== St. Ita's Hospital ===
Portrane's most prominent feature is Tower Bay, and Portrane asylum, more commonly known as St. Ita's Hospital. Built in the early 1900s, the asylum is made up of a number of Victorian red brick buildings which dominate the peninsula. Features within the main asylum building include two churches and an imposing clock tower. The building operated as a mental hospital for many years with it finally closing to inpatients in 2011 and outpatients in 2014 before being refurbished and repurposed as a modern mental health facility. Following the sale of the Central Mental Hospital in Dundrum in 2012 it was announced that it would relocate to the updated St.Ita's facility in Portrane.

In the hospital grounds is a monument to George Hampden Evans, a replica of an Irish round tower.

=== Portrane castle ===
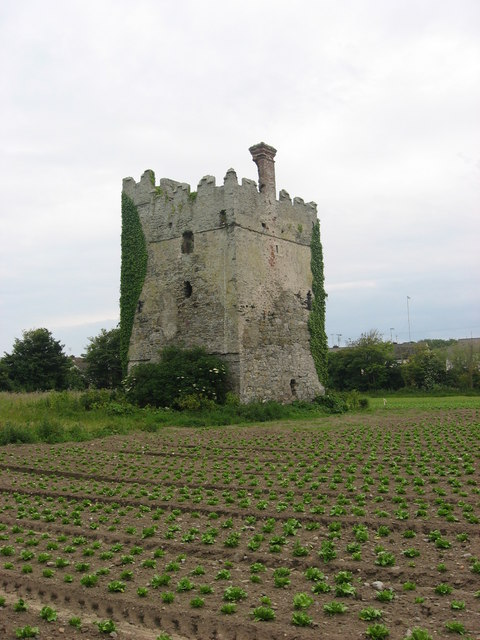
Portrane Castle

Portrane Castle (sometimes called Stella's Tower) is a 3-storey late medieval castellated tower house adjacent to St. Catherine's housing estate. Jonathan Swift's 'Stella', Esther Johnson is said to have stayed there and given the castle its unusual nickname. The inquisition of 1541 mentions the castle as being a substantial structure with associated outbuildings, including a threshing house and hemp yard, while the Civil Survey of 1655 describes this site as an old castle with a thatched hall adjoining owned by the parsonage of Portrane. A later brick chimney can also be seen at the top of the tower. Samuel Lewis describes the castle as long since deserted in his Topographical Dictionary of Ireland in 1837 and notes that the last occupant was Lady Acheson.

Today, the castle sits in a field of privately owned tillage land.

=== St. Catherine's Church and Graveyard ===
The church in Portrane was granted to the Convent of Grace Dieu in the 12th century. Originally called St. Canice's, a new church was built in the 14th century and renamed St. Catherine's. St. Catherine's was coupled with St. Patrick's, Donabate, with the vicar of Donabate serving in Portrane. With the decline of St. Catherine's, the parish was linked to Donabate in the 17th century, and only eventually merged in 1835. A number of members of the Evans family from Portrane Castle are buried in the church graveyard.

== Erosion ==
The coast in this area is subject to erosion, and since the 1980s, 100 acres (40 ha) of beach at Portrane has been lost. Many houses on the peninsula were demolished in the 1960s due to the dangers of erosion. A storm in March 2018 caused erosion of low cliffs backing the beach, and one home was destroyed. Concrete structures known as sea bees have been placed below the cliffs, but the erosion continues, and further houses are threatened.

== Popular culture ==
=== Music ===
Members of the band U2 owned a caravan in a field in Portrane where they composed some of the music and lyrics for their 1981 album, October. Lead singer Bono was baptized at Portrane beach by the Shalom religious group which all but Adam Clayton were a member of. Rock band the Delorentos are Portrane natives.

=== Television ===
Portrane has been used as a location for a number of film and television shoots. Parts of the Channel 4 television series Father Ted were filmed in Portrane, most notably Funland in the first episode "Good Luck, Father Ted" was filmed in Tower Bay. It was also featured in the BBC series Murphy's Law starring James Nesbitt.

== See also ==
- List of towns and villages in Ireland
