= C103 =

Cork; Ireland
- Broadcast area: Cork City and County
- Frequency: FM: 102.6–103.9 MHz
- RDS: C103 (North Cork/East Cork/City); C103West (West Cork)

Programming
- Language: English (one Irish-language programme)
- Format: Adult contemporary

Ownership
- Owner: News UK Broadcasting Ltd; (News UK)
- Sister stations: Cork's 96FM (dual franchise)

History
- First air date: 26 January 1990
- Former names: County Sound 103FM (1990–2008)

Links
- Webcast: c103.ie/player
- Website: c103.ie

C103 is one of three local radio stations licensed by the Coimisiún na Meán for Cork City and County in Ireland (the other two being its sister station 96FM and youth music station Red FM). It broadcasts from studios at St. Patrick's Place in Cork City since 2024 (the headquarters of sister station 96FM).

C103 is operated as a dual franchise with 96FM by County Media Limited which is owned by Onic.

Since 2016, the station is marketed as Cork's Greatest Hits.

== History ==
C103 logo used until 2016.

The station launched on 26 January 1990 (as County Sound 103FM) and was originally licensed for the north of County Cork. The station launch was performed by well-known Cork born actor Joe Lynch. The first programme broadcast was by Derry O' Callaghan who was also Programme Controller. Other presenters included Robert Walshe, Mike O' Sullivan, Brian Gunne, Sean Donlon, John O' Connor (Head of News), Mick Mulcachy and John Foot. The franchise was subsequently expanded to cover the whole county. As a dual franchise, the station's sound broadcasting contract (and thus its broadcasting licence) is advertised together with that of 96FM and one company is required to operate the two stations, in a similar situation to that of Shannonside FM and Northern Sound Radio in the north-west of Ireland. Most of the management are based at Broadcasting House in the city and are in charge of both stations. The only senior position which is separate for each station is that of the head of music.

In 2008 as part of a refresh of the station's sound, it was re-branded as C103, having previously traded as Cork's 103FM, 103FM County Sound, and County Sound 103FM. The refresh included a new jingle package from Jones TM, a reworked schedule which saw an end to networked programmes broadcast on both C103 and 96FM and a new music format, consisting mainly of music from the 1960s, 1970s and 1980s, in addition to a limited amount of more recent chart hits.

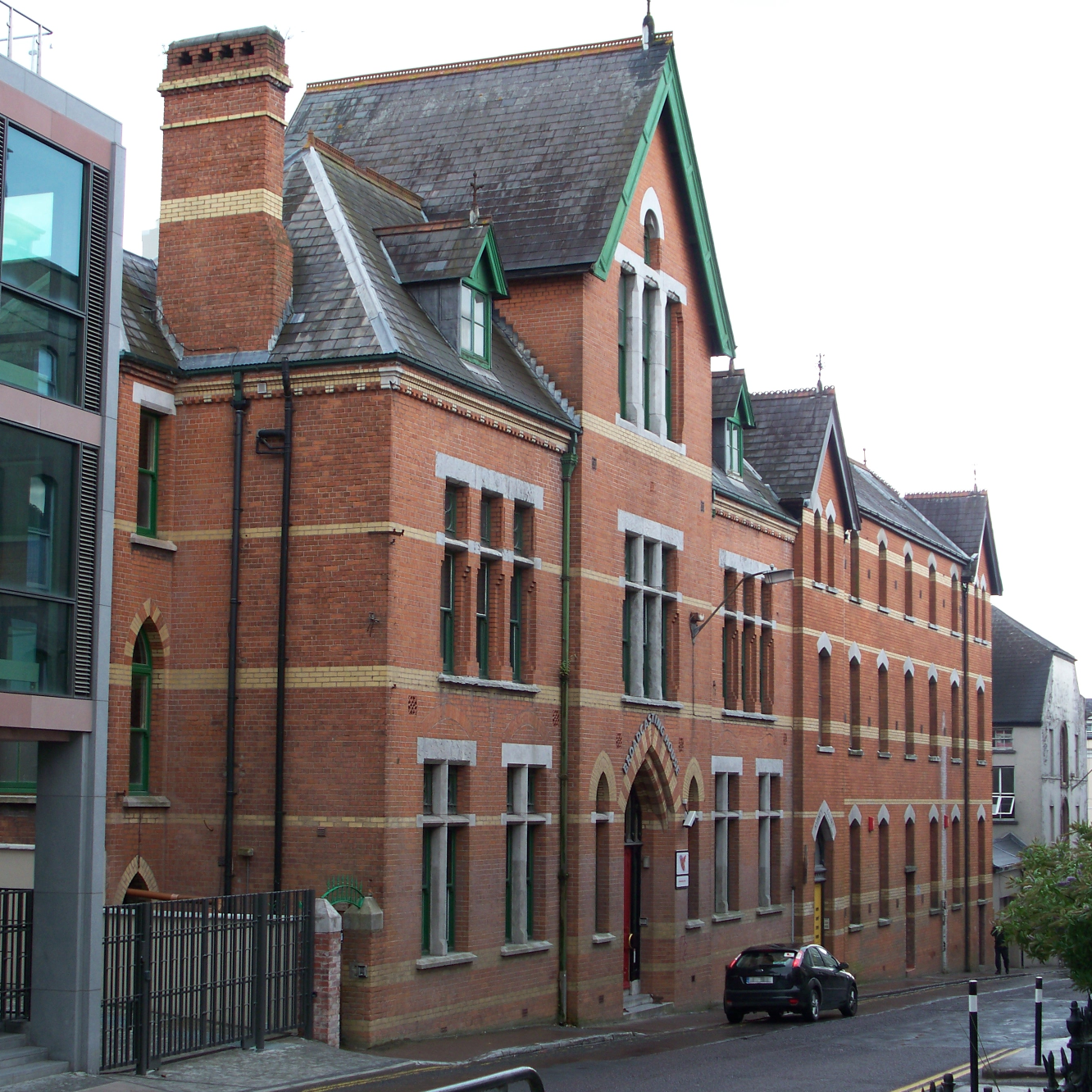
Broadcasting House, C103 and 96FM HQ

== West Cork studio ==
Since the expansion of the original County Sound 103FM into West Cork launched on 15 November 1990, the area had its own daily 'opt-out' programmes from a studio in Bandon, originally for 8 hours on weekdays, and less at weekends.

This was reduced significantly following the relaunch as C103 with current affairs show "West Cork Today" presented by David Young then becoming the only opt-out on weekdays.

=== "West Cork Today" ===
In what proved a controversial development in April 2009, C103 cancelled the "West Cork Today" show without warning, merging it with Patricia Messenger's "North Cork Today" to become a county-wide show titled "Cork Today" and presented from the main C103 studios in Mallow. People dissatisfied with the change stated that 'West Cork Today' had been one of the very few radio programmes serving the needs and addressing the issues of people in the far South-West.

From then until the November 2009 flood damage of the Bandon studio, the only remaining regular programmes specifically for the West Cork region were the "Saturday Sports Preview" on Saturday mornings, and Tim Coughlan's 'Irish Sunday' show on Sundays from 10 am until 2 pm. Occasionally there has been also separate GAA sports coverage on C103 West Cork.

Other output from the Bandon studio was broadcast county-wide:

- The C103 Drivetime Show with Martina O'Donoghue was broadcast from Bandon each weekday.
- Tim Coughlan's Sunday night programme also broadcast from Bandon.

All programmes from the Bandon studio were indefinitely suspended damage cased by flooding in November 2009, the separate programmes for west Cork were discontinued, and other 'countywide' programmes, which previously broadcast from Bandon, were transferred to the main studio at Mallow.

In May 2011, broadcasting resumed from the Bandon studio. Tim Coughlan's Sunday night programme moved back to Bandon on 1 May, with the show also being extended by one hour, whilst on 15 May a separate west Cork 'opt-out' Irish Sunday show from 10AM to 2PM on Sundays resumed, presented by the well-remembered John Greene, who had last worked for the then 103FM over seven years previously and in the interim had worked for Radio Kerry. John Greene had been known to West Cork listeners since the days of the pirate WKLR radio from Bandon in the 1980s (on which Tim Coughlan and C103 head of sport Michael Scanlon had also broadcast) and had presented on County Sound from the launch of its West Cork service in 1990.

== News ==
News bulletins from the Cork newsroom are broadcast from 6:30am to 7pm (weekends from 8am to 6pm) with news bulletins from Bauer Media Audio Ireland outside these times. Bulletins run for five or six minutes throughout the day, and the 10am, 11am, 12pm and the flagship 6pm bulletin runs for ten minutes.

== Frequencies ==
- **102.6FM** Cork City and areas of East Cork
- 102.7FM Bantry
- 102.9FM Fermoy – Mitchelstown area
- 103.0FM (a) Youghal, (b) Kinsale
- **103.3FM** West Cork, and also Fermoy town booster
- 103.5FM Carrigaline & Cobh
- **103.7FM** North Cork
- 103.9FM Clonakilty, Macroom

(main frequencies in bold)
