= Cork's 96FM =

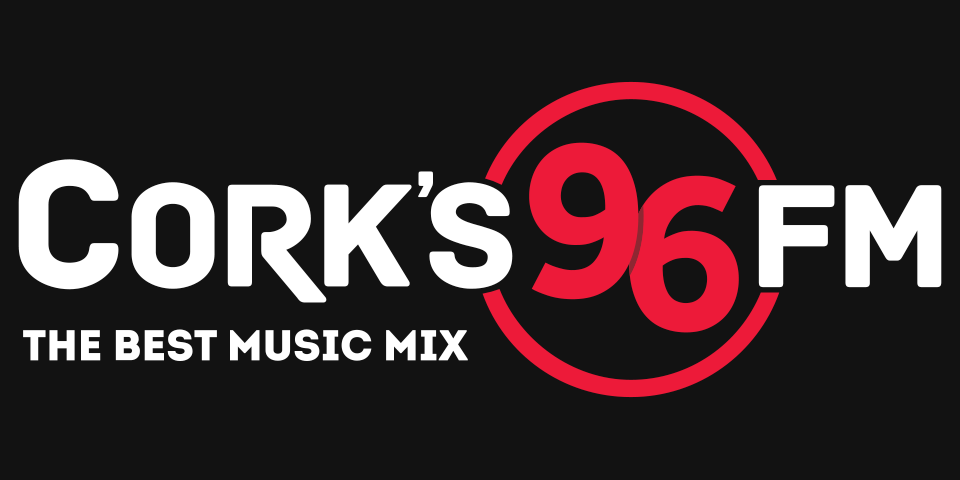
- Logo used since 2016
- Cork; Ireland
- Broadcast area: Cork City and County
- Frequency: FM: 95.6–96.8 MHz
- RDS: 96FM

Programming
- Language: English
- Format: AC/talk

Ownership
- Owner: News UK Broadcasting Ltd; (News UK)
- Sister stations: C103 (dual franchise) (Note: See Radio in Ireland#Cork ILRs)

History
- First air date: 10 August 1989
- Former names: Radio South (1989–1990); Hits and Memories 96FM (1990–c. 1998)

Links
- Webcast: 96fm.ie/player
- Website: 96fm.ie

Cork's 96FM is one of three local radio stations licensed by the Broadcasting Commission of Ireland for Cork City and County in Ireland (the other two being its sister station C103 and youth music station Red FM). It broadcasts from studios at Broadcasting House, St. Patrick's Place in Cork City.

96FM is operated as a dual franchise with C103 by County Media Limited which is owned by Onic which is in turn owned by News Broadcasting. The station's sound broadcasting contract (and thus its broadcasting licence) is advertised together with that of C103 and one company is required to operate the two stations, in a similar situation to that of Shannonside FM and Northern Sound Radio in the north-west of Ireland.

== History ==
Cork's 96FM logo used from 2009 to 2016.

=== Radio South ===
Founded by four former Cork Examiner journalists, with backing from a number of Cork business people, Cork's 96FM launched as "Radio South" at midday on Thursday 10 August 1989. However, that name lasted for less than a year. Radio South was the third of the newly licensed commercial stations to come on air in the country (Dublin's Capital Radio and County Mayo's Mid West Radio being first and second respectively).

The first voice heard on air was the station's first Head of Programming Frank Murphy who introduced the new station in both Irish and English. This was followed by Neil Prendeville's first show, the first song played was "A New Flame" by Simply Red – a chart hit at the time. The Lord Mayor of Cork – Councillor Chrissie Aherne, who had been flown by helicopter to the station's studio (located just to the north of the city at Whites Cross), then officially opened the station for business.

The first day's broadcasting featured several outside broadcasts from across the coverage area. Local dignitaries, were invited by the station to an event that night in Cork's Imperial Hotel which was attended by several hundred people. The attendance included the chairman of the Independent Radio and Television Commission (IRTC), former Supreme Court Judge Séamus Henchy.

Many of the original voices on the new station were familiar to Cork listeners; Tadgh Dolan was formerly of RTÉ's local radio service, RTÉ Radio Cork, while Neil Prendeville, Tony Magnier, Joe O'Reilly, Gerry McLoughlin, Paul Byrne, Rob Allen and others had formerly been heard on now defunct local pirate stations, such as ERI, the major pirate station in the area which closed around midnight 30 December 1988.

The initial Radio South provided a wide-ranging format, and a number of special interest programmes, including an hour-long country music show at 18:00 every weeknight presented by local country music authority Roger Ryan. Joe O'Reilly presented the 'Oldies and Irish' show on Sundays, a vestige from Radio ERI. Radio South broadcast 24 hours a day from the outset, unlike many other of the new local stations who closed overnight in their early days.

=== Hits and Memories 96FM ===
Mediocre listenership figures for Radio South led to a relaunch in July 1990 and a name change to 'Hits and Memories 96FM'. The station was now under a Classic Hits format imported from Australia, similar to that of the by then successful Classic Hits 98FM in Dublin. By this stage the original special interest programmes of Radio South were gone (except the 'Oldies and Irish' show on Sundays which, thanks to public support, survived the upheaval). The programme, presented since 1991 by Derry O' Callaghan, was the most listened to show on local radio in Ireland as of 2015. The new format lead to a gradual increase in listenership.

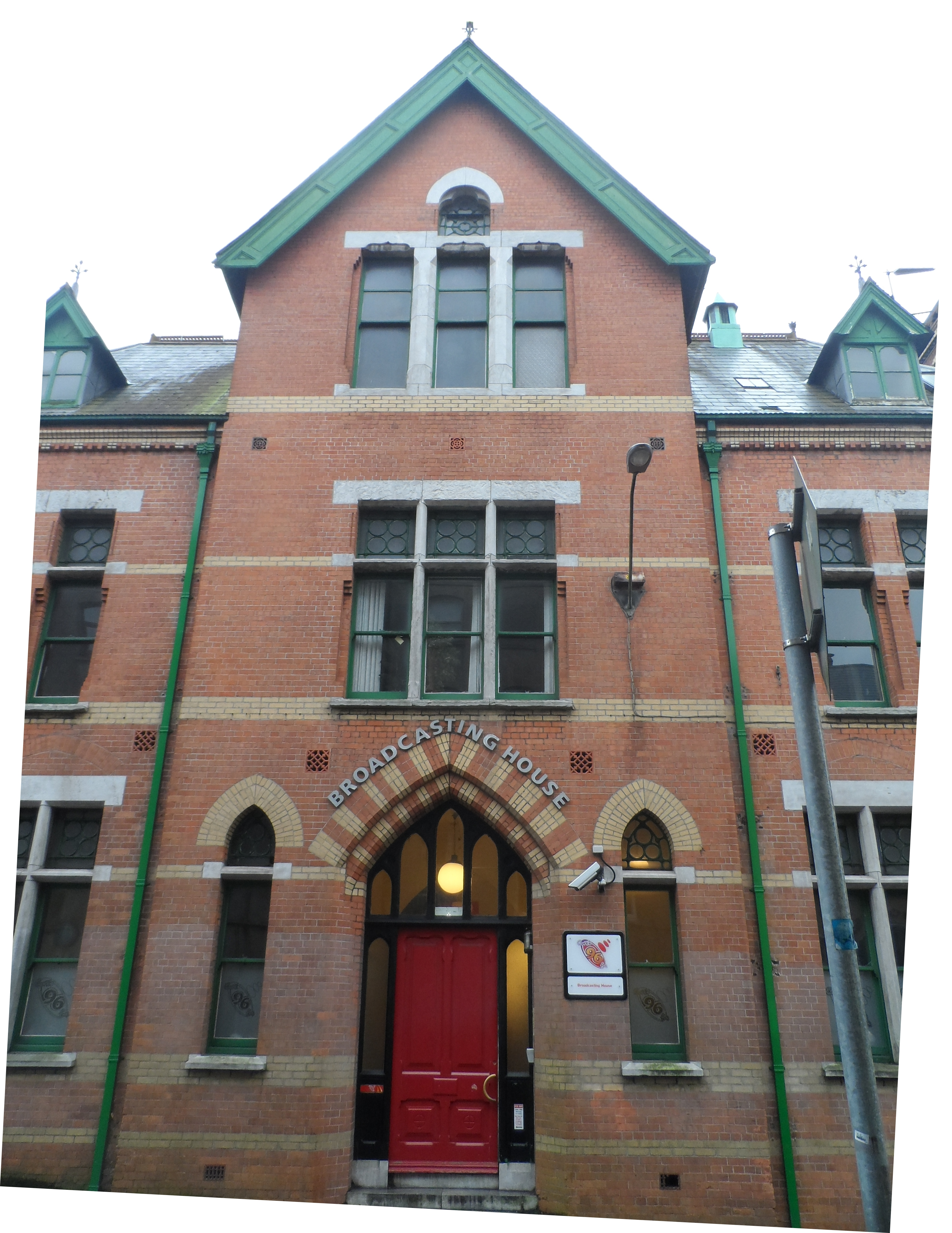
Broadcasting House, the headquarters of Cork's 96FM and the Cork City studios for its sister station, C103

=== Merge-over with County Sound and office relocation ===
In 1991, a 'merge-over' took place between 96FM and the Mallow-based County Sound 103FM coming under a common ownership and combined JNLR figures. In 1994, the station moved premises from the rural Whites Cross (the former Radio ERI studios) to a city centre location at Patrick's Place which is a small section of Wellington Road, in a building which was formerly the location of St Finbarr's College and then Christian Brothers College. The station named its new premises 'Broadcasting House'.

RTÉ's John Murray was "Head of News" at 96FM from 1990 until 1992.

=== Late 1990s ===
The late 1990s led to the complete discarding of the 'Hits and Memories' moniker, and some programming changes, with night-time programmes to appeal to younger listeners (not heard in Cork since the Radio South days) being introduced. The late 1990s and early 2000s also saw the introduction of new transmitters to provide practically full coverage of the county (the original licence was for Cork city and part of the county, but this was later extended to allow the whole county to be covered.

=== 21st century ===
Writing in Radio Today in 2013, Kieran McGeary, Chief Executive, Station Manager and Programme Director of Cork's 96FM and C103, stated that 96FM had a "very strong line-up" but that finding new younger talent was a major challenge for the whole radio industry.

In 2014, the station's flagship presenter, Neil Prendeville, departed 96FM for rival station RedFM. In August 2015, 96FM's listenership figures slid behind those of RedFM for the first time in the history of the stations.

In 2024, the station adopted its first networked programming from sister Wireless Group stations. These include a new Sunday morning show featuring veteran broadcaster Ryan Tubridy, produced by Virgin Radio in London. Both shows retain local branding and regional news services. The station also provides networked output for Live95 in Limerick, from 8pm-12am weekdays.

== Controversy ==
In March 2023 the station made the front page of a National Newspaper when former newsreader Pearse McCarthy was accused of drug dealing, which occurred during his time as a newsreader and presenter with 96FM. He was later convicted and sentenced to 8 years for drug dealing.

== Frequencies ==
- 95.6 Fermoy-Mitchelstown area
- **95.8** (a) West County Cork, (b) Fermoy Town
- 96.0 Carrigaline-Cobh
- **96.1** North County Cork
- 96.2 (a) Macroom (b) Clonakilty
- **96.4** (a) Cork City and surrounding county areas (b) Bantry
- 96.8 (a) Youghal (b) Kinsale

(mains in bold)
